= The Warrens of Virginia =

The Warrens of Virginia can refer to:

- The Warrens of Virginia (play), a 1907 Broadway play by William C. DeMille
- The Warrens of Virginia (1915 film), a silent film directed by Cecil B. DeMille
- The Warrens of Virginia (1924 film), a silent film directed by Elmer Clifton
