= Mrs. Partridge Presents =

Play by Mary Kennedy and Ruth Hawthorne

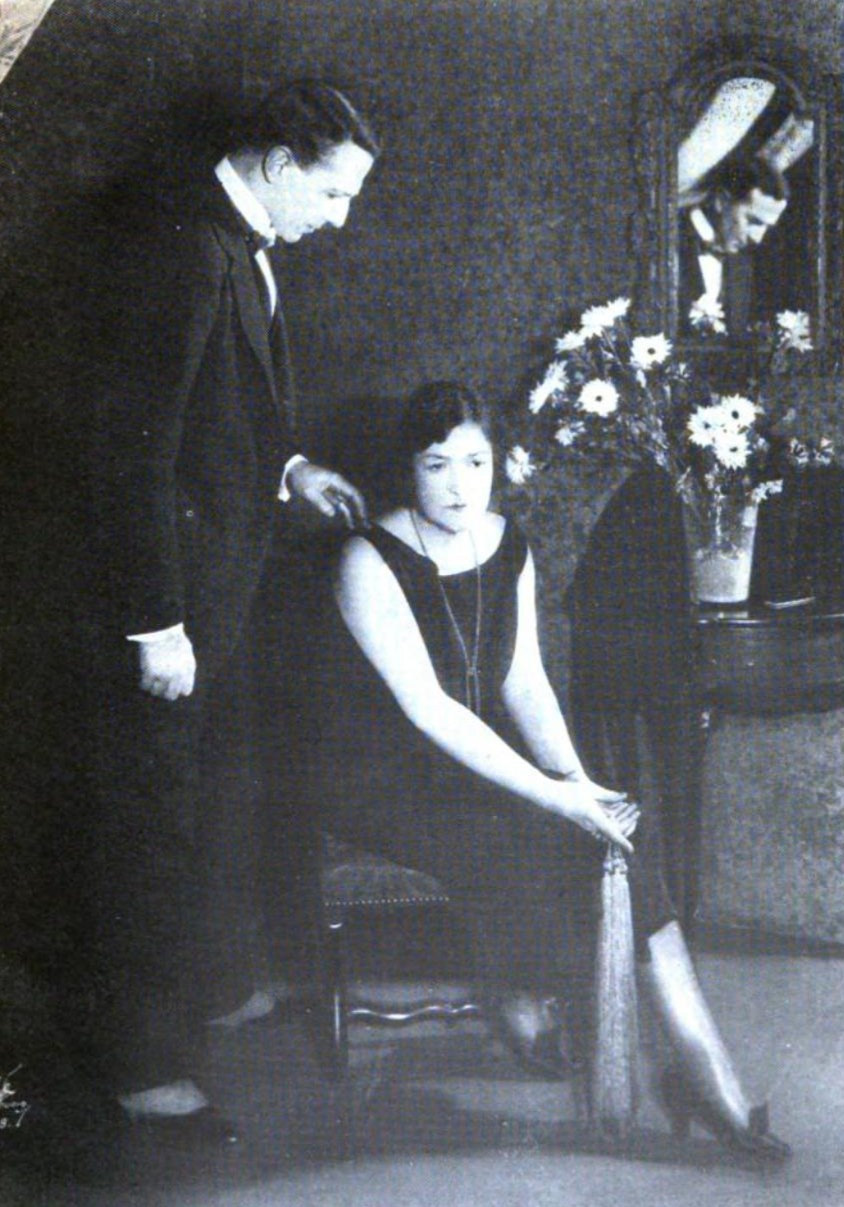
- Charles Waldron and Blanche Bates
- Original language: English
- Written by: Mary Kennedy and Ruth Hawthorne
- Subject: Parental determinism
- Genre: Comedy
- Setting: A Washington Square apartment, and a hat shop

Premiere
- Date: January 5, 1925
- Place: Belmont Theatre
- Directed by: Guthrie McClintic

Mrs. Partridge Presents is a 1924 play by Mary Kennedy and Ruth Hawthorne. It is a three-act comedy, with two settings, and eleven speaking characters. The action of the play occurs over six months time. The story concerns a successful dressmaker in Manhattan who tries to steer her adult children's career choices.

The play was first produced and staged by Guthrie McClintic, with scenic design by Jo Mielziner. The play starred Blanche Bates, with Ruth Gordon, Sylvia Field and Charles Waldron. It had a brief tryout in Springfield, Massachusetts during late December 1924, before premiering on Broadway in early January 1925, where it ran through May 1925 for 144 performances. Burns Mantle included it with The Best Plays of 1924-25.

== Characters ==
Characters are listed in order of appearance within their scope.

Lead

- Maisie Partridge is 40, a widow and successful modiste, who rejects conventionality. (Note: She is a member of the Lucy Stone League, who encourages her children to be individuals, but also uses their affection for her to pressure them. They call Maisie by her first name, and for her sake reluctantly embrace the careers she chose for them.)

Supporting

- Philip Partridge is 23, Maisie's son, a college graduate whom she wants to be a painter.
- Delight Partridge is 20, Maisie's daughter, a drama school graduate and apprentice actress.
- Stephen Applegate is Maisie's attorney, a tall, kindly middle-aged man who loves his client.
- Katherine Everitt called Katy, is Delight's friend.
- Sydney Armistead is a wealthy young farmer, friends with Philip and Charles, interested in Delight.

Featured

- Ellen is 40, the Partridge's patient Irish housekeeper.
- Charles Ludlow is a engineer friend of Philip, who has a commission to build a bridge in Spain.
- Miss Hamilton is the manager of Mrs. Partridge's dress shop.
- Clementine is Mrs. Partridge's shop employee, acting as Delight's stage dresser.
- Madame La Fleur is a French milliner, brought over by Mrs. Partridge. (Note: This character was created after the Broadway premiere, at the suggestion of Guthrie McClintic. She appears at the play's end; her lines are all in French.)

Walk-ons

- Pete and Sam are workmen helping remodel the hat shop. (Note: Essentially they are stage hands who carry out their tasks while the curtain is up. They appear briefly in Act III and have no lines.)

== Synopsis ==
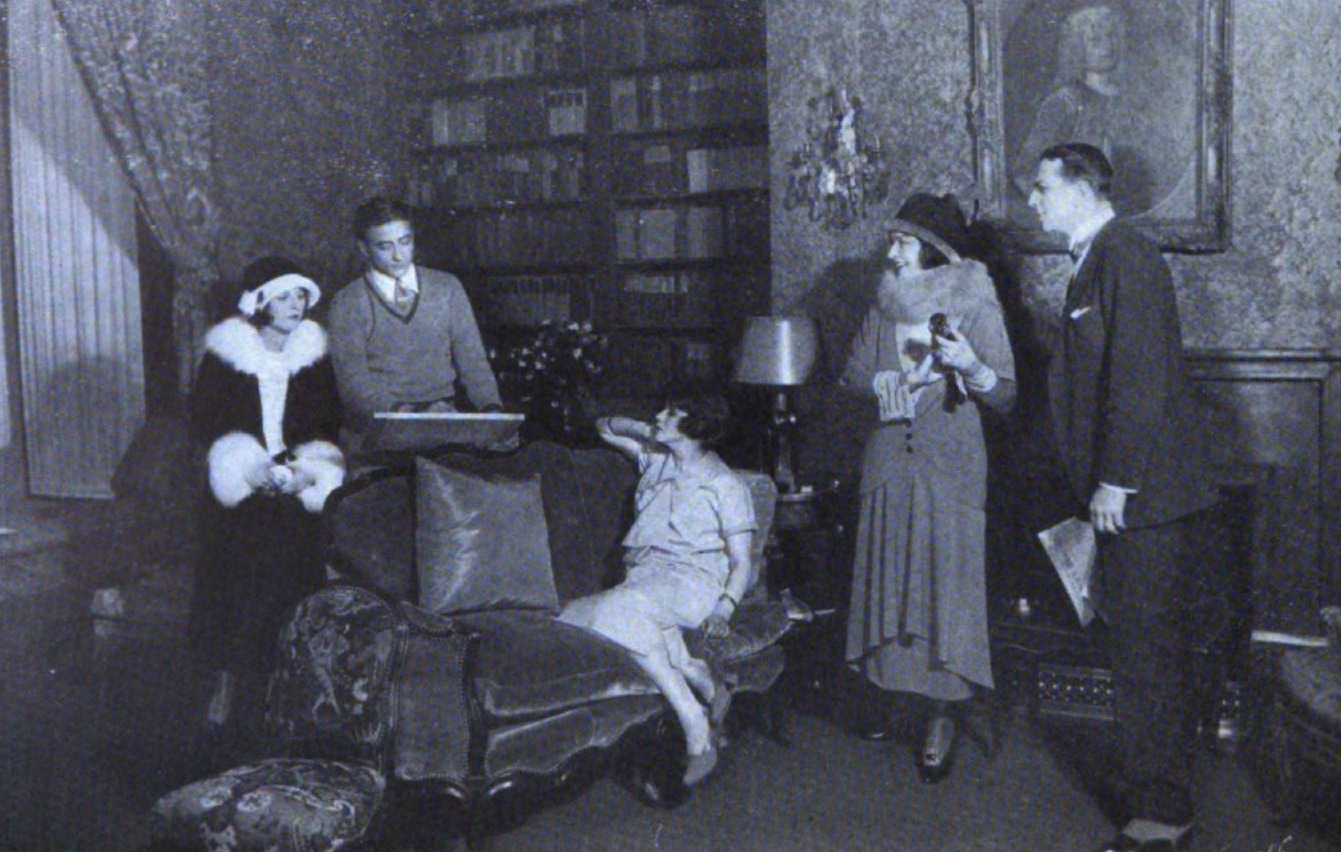

Act I (Living room of Maisie Partridge's Washington Square apartment. Morning of an October day.) At curtain rise, Ellen speaks with Philip Partridge who is sketching. Her slight malapropism and his inattention gives the introductory exposition an off-kilter flavor. Ellen has him wake Delight, who had late rehearsals for a vaudeville sketch. Delight is anxious about Sydney Armitage calling, but when the doorbell rings it is Stephen Applegate. He is flustered by a trade paper's announcement that Mrs. Partridge will present hats by Madame La Fleur come the spring, derailing a real estate deal he setup for her. When Maisie arrives, she is amused by Stephen's discomfiture, and pays more attention to Philip's sketches than his complaints. But Maisie grows alarmed at the arrival of Sydney Armitage; her plans for Delight's acting career precludes any romance. Having been married at 17, and widowed a few years later, Maisie is against marriage for Delight. Maisie deliberately calls Sydney by various last names, and finally reveals Delight is an actress, something the girl had kept secret from him. Upset, Sydney decides to go with Delight and Maisie to the afternoon rehearsal. (Curtain)

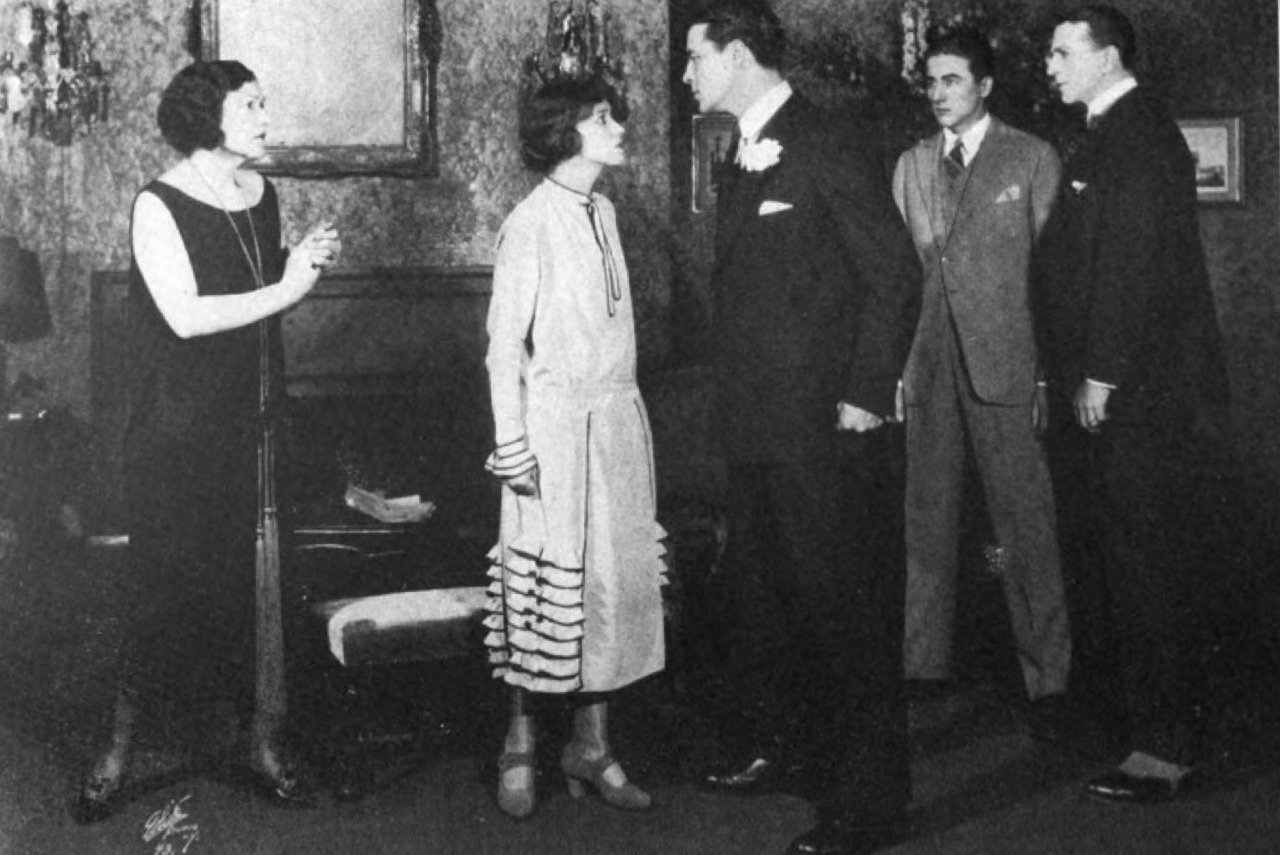

Act II (The same. The following April, an afternoon.) Katy calls on Delight with a message from Sydney. She is their go-between, since Maisie forbade Delight to see him anymore. Sydney is expecting her to meet him, so they can elope. Maisie returns home unexpectedly from her shop. She insists Delight must go audition for a part in a Broadway production. Delight tries to beg off, but Maisie insists. She tells Delight the unhappy story of her own marriage, how she wanted to act and paint but couldn't once she had wed. Stay independent she urges Delight, do not get married. Delight confronts her mother over always standing out, from her name to the custom dresses Maisie designed for her. She wanted to wear Peter Thomsons like other girls. Sydney, growing impatient, comes up to the apartment with Charlie Ludlow. Philip wants to go to Spain with Charlie to work on building a bridge. Maisie is astonished to find Sydney there and tries to throw him out. She quarrels with Delight who in turn quarrels with Sydney. Finally Sydney and Delight both storm out. Maisie begs Stephen to resurrect the real estate deal, but its too late... Madame La Fleur has already set sail for New York and needs the property for her hat shop. Maisie confesses that she invested all her money in the Broadway show to secure the "audition" for Delight; she needs to sell the property to keep operating. Stephen promises to secure a bank loan for her, though she turns down his proposal. But Delight phones... she went to the producer and took the part after all. (Curtain)

“MAISIE. She's married him. I've failed Stephen.
STEPHEN. No, you haven't failed.
MAISIE. I've nothing left to live for.
STEPHEN. You have your own life to live, my dear.
MAISIE. I have no life outside of my children's lives.
STEPHEN. The whole trouble was that they had no life outside of yours.”
– From Act III of Mrs. Partridge Presents

Act III (The new and as yet unopened hat shop. A week later.) Katy pops into the closed hat shop to annoy Miss Hamilton with her inane chatter. Knowing Katy is wealthy and an easy sales target, Miss Hamilton directs Clementine to steer her back to the dress shop next door. Maisie arrives, worried both by Madame La Fleur's imminent arrival and by Delight's dress rehearsal. Stephen tells her that Madame La Fleur has arrived a day early and will soon be at the shop. Maisie is petulant when Philip tells her he is going to Spain for six months, but will keep up his sketching. She would rather he drop art altogether if he will not work at it fulltime. Worse news is coming; Delight drops by to tell Maisie she is married to Sydney, and quitting the show. She insists the understudy is better than her anyway, and she would rather be a wife and mother. Left alone with Stephen, Maisie laments her double betrayal, while he reminds her they have lives of their own to live. She is disconsolate, yet bucks up when Madame La Fleur comes into the shop, and welcomes her as a fellow professional. (Curtain)

== Original production ==
=== Background ===
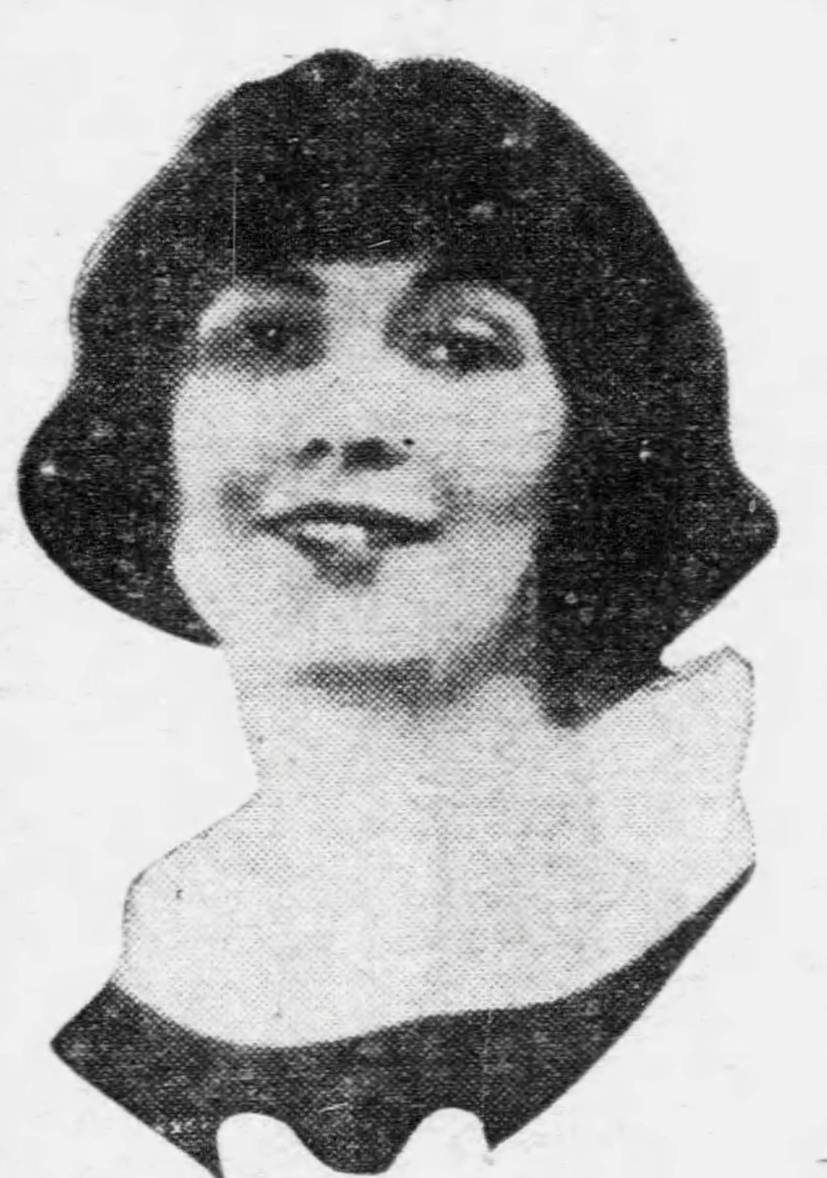
Mary Kennedy

Guthrie McClintic had started rehearsals in November 1924 for a play called Chattels by Lewis Beach, with Blanche Bates in the leading role. After two weeks of rehearsal, he switched the entire cast to Mrs. Partridge Presents. The co-authors were Mary Kennedy (1896-1987), a stage actress married at the time to Deems Taylor, and Ruth Hawthorne. According to Burns Mantle, they also worked for newspapers. They submitted Mrs. Partridge Presents directly to Guthrie McClintic who decided to produce and stage it himself.

The sets were designed by Jo Mielziner, while Edwin H. Morse, who had a walk-on role as Sam, was the stage manager. Ruth Gordon joined the cast in mid-December 1924; she would be billed second in advertising, while Blanche Bates would have top billing.

=== Cast ===
Cast from the Springfield, Massachusetts tryout through the Broadway run.
Role	Actor	Dates	Notes and sources
Maisie Partridge	Blanche Bates	Dec 29, 1924 - May 09, 1925	
Philip Partridge	Edward Emery Jr	Dec 29, 1924 - May 09, 1925	
Delight Partridge	Sylvia Field	Dec 29, 1924 - May 09, 1925	
Stephen Applegate	Charles Waldron	Dec 29, 1924 - May 09, 1925	
Katherine Everitt	Ruth Gordon	Dec 29, 1924 - May 09, 1925	This was Gordon's first Broadway performance without her mentor and husband Gregory Kelly.
Sydney Armistead	Elliot Cabot	Dec 29, 1924 - May 09, 1925	
Ellen	Augusta Haviland	Dec 29, 1924 - May 09, 1925	
Charles Ludlow	C. Haviland Chappell	Dec 29, 1924 - May 09, 1925	
Miss Hamilton	Virginia Chauvenet	Dec 29, 1924 - May 09, 1925	
Clementine	Elaine Evans	Dec 29, 1924 - May 09, 1925	
Madame La Fleur	Ann Tonetti	Feb 09, 1925 - May 09, 1925	She was a society girl who had studied acting; this part was added after the premiere.

=== Tryout ===
Mrs. Partridge Presents was first performed at the Court Square Theatre, in Springfield, Massachusetts, starting December 29, 1924. This was a three-day, four-performance tryout. Local reviewers were enthusiastic about the play and performers. Critic A. L. S. Wood wrote of the story that "a swan had mothered ducklings" and as always happens the young defeat the old, but the playwrights had been fair in apportioning rational arguments to each side. Wood judged the first act to be a fine example of naturalism in drama: no obvious cues or actors standing about idle, just casual conversation that appears to drift while advancing the story. Louise Mace expressed admiration for the first time playwrights, saying that though an excellent cast gave it animation, they provided knowledgeable character drawing and natural dialog for the actors to build upon.

=== Broadway premiere and reception ===
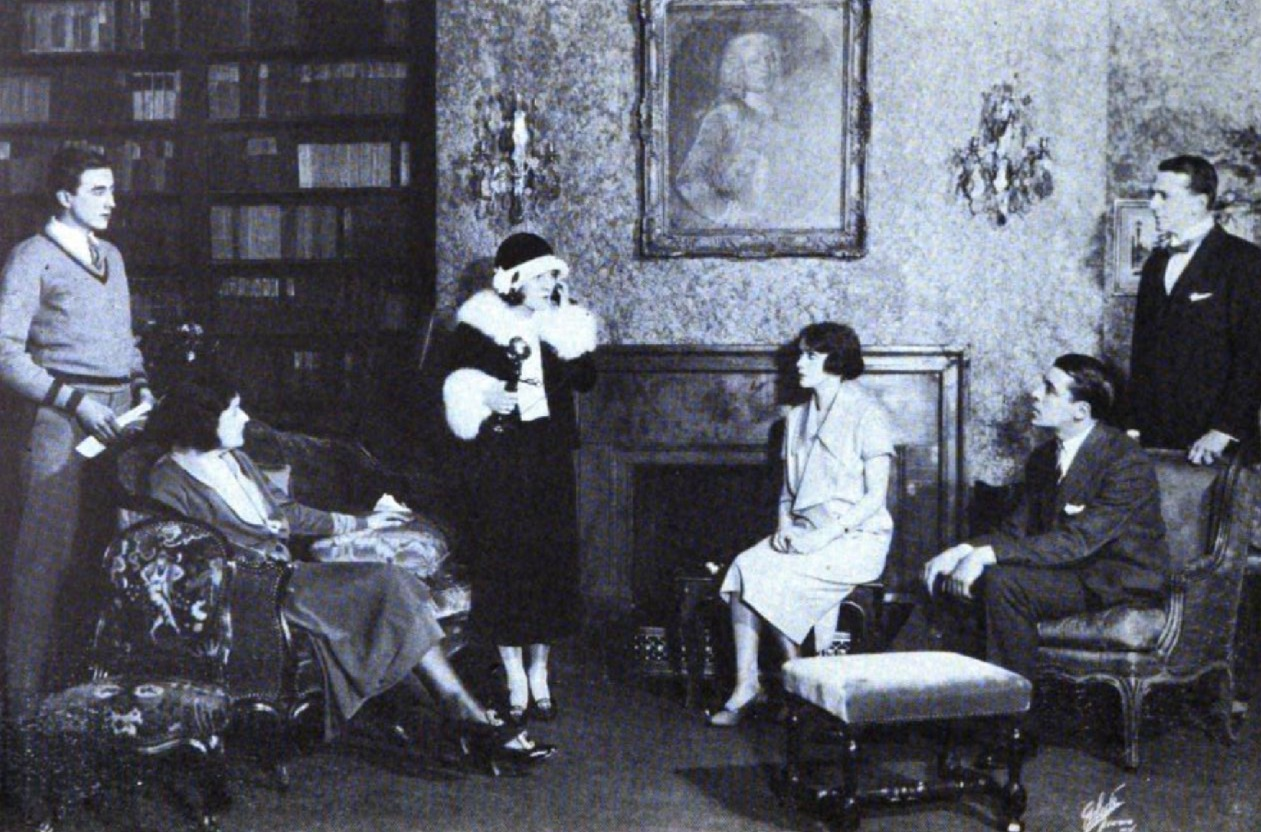

The production had its Broadway premiere at the Belmont Theatre on January 5, 1925. A reviewer for The Brooklyn Daily Eagle identified the playwright's theme as the bad habit parents have of planning their offspring's future, while inverting the usual stance of conservative parent versus visionary youth. They thought Blanche Bates' performance rendered her character coy rather than charming, and though Ruth Gordon was effective she was also monotonous, while Sylvia Field and Charles Waldron both did justice to their characters. The critic for The Brooklyn Daily Times said that though the theme was not original, Mary Kennedy and Ruth Hawthorne had a fresh take on it that made the play worth seeing.

Burns Mantle was positive about the play, which he said was "brightly and intelligently written. There is wit in it and laughter and a common human problem." However, he also thought it a bit theatrical, so it did not provoke strong feelings. He felt all the principals performed well, while singling out Ruth Gordon as the comic highlight. Stark Young agreed that Ruth Gordon was the crowd pleaser on opening night, while Blanche Bates exhibited some nervousness but performed effectively. However, he shaded Edward Emery Jr by saying the son was not well cast without naming him. He complimented the authors for not resorting to some stock character to provide the conflict, but let it develop "through a pleasant interchange of personalities".

=== Broadway closing ===
Mrs. Partridge Presents finished its Broadway run at the Belmont Theatre on Saturday, May 9, 1925, after 144 performances. Burns Mantle included it in his annual The Best Plays of 1924-25.

== Bibliography ==
- Burns Mantle (ed). The Best Plays of 1924-25 And The Year Book Of The Drama In America. Dodd, Mead and Company, 1925.
- Mary Kennedy and Ruth Hawthorne. Mrs. Partridge Presents: A Comedy in Three Acts. Samuel French, 1925.
