= The Goose Hangs High =

1925 film directed by James Cruze

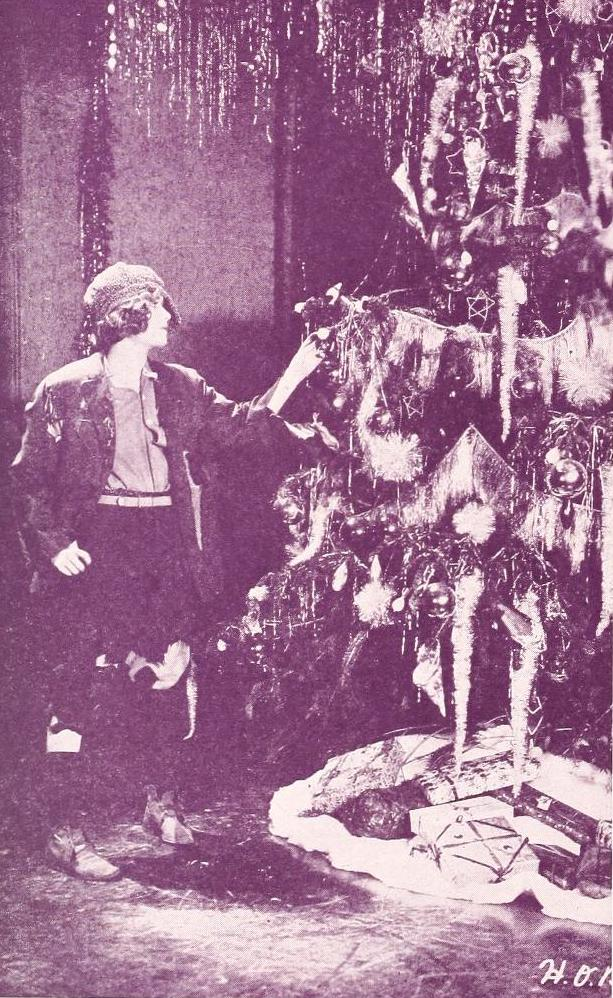
- Publicity photo
- Directed by: James Cruze
- Screenplay by: Lewis Beach; Anthony Coldeway; Walter Woods
- Based on: The Goose Hangs High by Lewis Beach
- Produced by: James Cruze
- Starring: Constance Bennett; Myrtle Stedman; George Irving; Esther Ralston; William R. Otis Jr. Edward Peil Jr. Gertrude Claire
- Cinematography: Karl Brown
- Production companies: Dramatist Theatre; Famous Players–Lasky Corporation
- Distributed by: Paramount Pictures
- Release date: March 30, 1925
- Running time: 60 minutes
- Country: United States
- Language: Silent (English intertitles)

The Goose Hangs High is a 1925 American silent comedy film directed by James Cruze and written by Lewis Beach, Anthony Coldeway, and Walter Woods. It is based on the play The Goose Hangs High by Lewis Beach. There was a sound remake in 1932 called This Reckless Age. The film stars Constance Bennett, Myrtle Stedman, George Irving, Esther Ralston, William R. Otis Jr., Edward Peil Jr., and Gertrude Claire. The film was released on March 30, 1925, by Paramount Pictures.

== Plot ==
As described in a film magazine review, the Ingals prepare to give their home-coming children a big Christmas, despite the fact that they are almost penniless. They forget their parents, however, in the mad whirl of parties. Bernard Ingals tells his political boss what he thinks of him and resigns from his city job. Grandma tells the children the truth, and they pitch in and save the household and father gets a better job.

== Cast ==
- Constance Bennett as Lois Ingals
- Myrtle Stedman as Eunice Ingals
- George Irving as Bernard Ingals
- Esther Ralston as Dagmar Carroll
- William R. Otis Jr. as Hugh Ingals
- Edward Peil Jr. as Bradley Ingals
- Gertrude Claire as Granny
- James A. Marcus as Elliott Kimberly
- Anne Schaefer as Rhoda
- Z. Wall Covington as Noel Derby
- Cecille Evans as Mazie

Dorothy The Goose Hangs High, Transcription-traduction du rapport d'évasion du Staff sergeant Robert G. Hauger (21 mai 1944) is the title of a booklet publicated by Le Huron immobile ed. (printed in France, 2018).

== Preservation ==
The film is now lost.
