= The Warrens of Virginia (play) =

Play by William C. de Mille

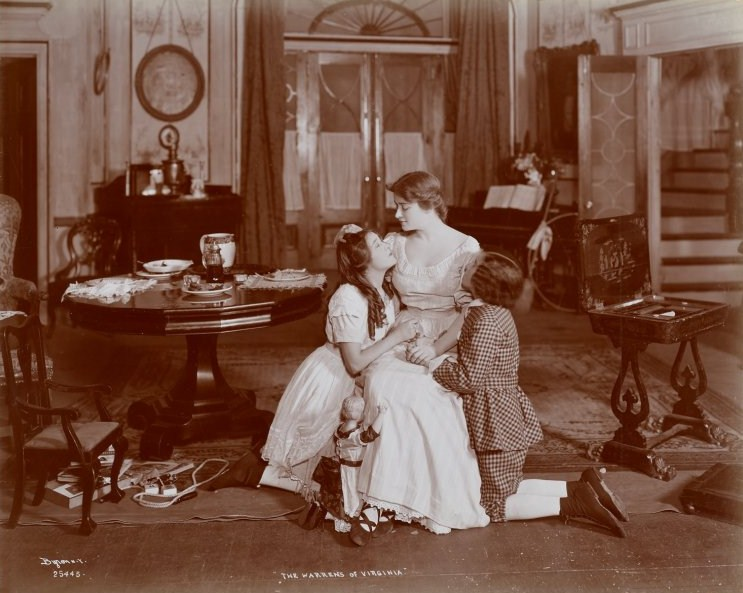
Mary Pickford, Charlotte Walker, and Richard Storey in the play

The Warrens of Virginia is a dramatic play set during the American Civil War by playwright William C. de Mille. It was produced on Broadway by David Belasco in 1907 and was the basis for two films in 1915 (directed by the playwright's brother, Cecil B. DeMille) and in 1924. The play was also the basis for a novelization by author George Cary Eggleston in 1908.

== Broadway run ==
The Warrens of Virginia premiered in New York at the Belasco Theater (formerly the Stuyvesant Theater) on December 3, 1907. The production ran for a total of 380 performances, finally closing in October, 1908. The producer was Broadway impresario David Belasco, and the show starred Charles Waldron as Lt. Ned Burton and Charlotte Walker as Agatha Warren. The production marked the Broadway debut of supporting player Mary Pickford as Betty Warren, her first major professional role after years of touring in small regional troupes under her given name, Gladys Smith.

It was at Belasco's insistence that she adopted the stage name "Mary Pickford" for the show. Another notable supporting player, in the role of Arthur Warren, was the playwright's brother, Cecil B. DeMille, who went on to direct The Warrens of Virginia in a silent film version in 1915. Actor DeWitt Jennings was the only cast member to appear in both the Broadway production and the 1915 film.

== Principal roles and 1907 cast ==
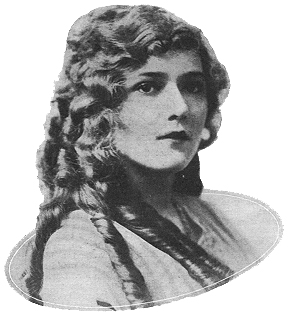
Mary Pickford in the original Broadway production of The Warrens of Virginia (1907)

The original Broadway cast is listed at the Internet Broadway Database.

- Blake - Raymond L. Bond
- Sapho - Mrs. Charles G. Craig
- Arthur Warren - Cecil B. DeMille
- Mrs. Warren - Emma Dunn
- Gen. Harding - DeWitt Jennings
- Gen. Warren - Frank Keenan
- Tom Dabney - Ralph Kellard
- Gen. Carr - E. Allen Martin
- Gen. Griffin - William McVay
- Betty Warren - Mary Pickford
- Billy Peavy - Willard Robertson
- Bob Warren - Master Richard Storey
- Lt. Ned Burton - Charles D. Waldron
- Molly Hatton - Isabel Waldron
- Agatha Warren - Charlotte Walker
- Zack Biggs - Frederick Watson
- Cpl. De Peyster - Stanhope Wheatcroft

== Synopsis ==
At the Virginia plantation of Gen. Warren, the general hosts an elegant ball to honor his old comrade in the Mexican War, General Griffin. Griffin's nephew, Ned Burton, who has been courting Gen. Warren's daughter, Agatha, now proposes marriage to her. But before she can answer, a courier arrives with news of the shelling of Fort Sumter. The Confederate States will declare their secession from the Union. Ned - torn by his love for Agatha, a Southern sympathizer, and love of country - decides to join the Union Army as a Lieutenant while Agatha's father, Gen. Warren, takes command of his Confederate forces.

Four years later, starving Confederate troops wait desperately for a supply train and reinforcements. After Ned is invited to call at the Warren home, Gen. Griffin plants phony orders on him so that they will be found and the train re-routed. The ruse works and the supply train is destroyed. When Ned is about to be shot as a spy, Agatha arranges his escape, but he is too proud to accept her help. When Lee surrenders, Ned is freed. Thinking that he betrayed her, Agatha rebukes Ned, but Gen. Griffin explains his deceptive ploy, and Agatha now accepts Ned's marriage proposal.
