= John B. Mason =

American actor

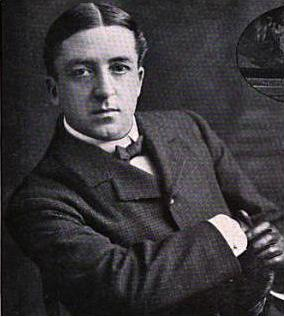
- John B. Mason (circa 1900s)
- Born: John Hill Belcher Mason; October 28, 1858; Orange, New Jersey, U.S.
- Died: January 12, 1919 (aged 60); Stamford, Connecticut, U.S.
- Occupation: Stage actor
- Years active: 1878-1919
- Spouses: Marion Manola; Katherine Grey

Signature
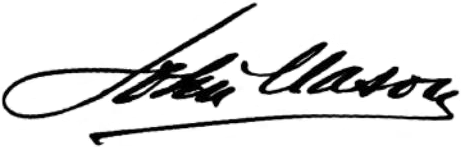

John Hill Belcher Mason (October 28, 1858 – January 12, 1919) was an American stage actor popular during the decades surrounding the start of the twentieth century.

== Early life ==
John Hill Belcher Mason was born in Orange, New Jersey the son of Daniel Gregory and Susan W. (née Belcher) Mason. He was the son of a publisher and a grandson of Dr. Lowell Mason, a well–known educator and composer of Christian music. Mason was a cousin to composer and music critic Daniel Gregory Mason and could trace his American lineage back to Robert Mason, an Englishman who settled in Salem, Massachusetts, in 1630. His mother was a direct descendant of Jonathan Belcher, a colonial governor of the Province of Massachusetts Bay. John Mason was educated in private schools in America and overseas at the Frankfort Gymnasium, before enrolling at Columbia University in 1876.

== Career ==
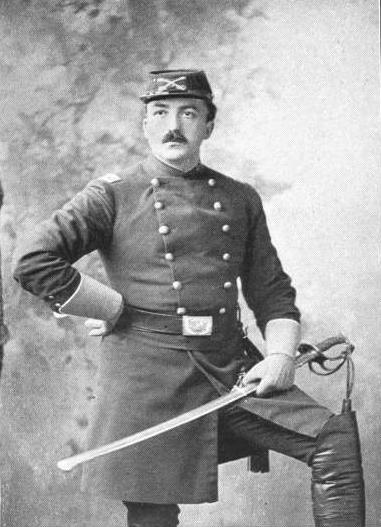
As Kerchival West in Shenandoah

John Mason (often referred to by the press as Jack Mason) made his professional stage debut two years later at the Walnut Street Theatre in Philadelphia. During his first season he appeared opposite notable actors of the day including Lawrence Barrett, Mary Anderson, Lotta Crabtree, James K. Emmet, J. C. Williamson, Mme. Janauschek, Fanny Davenport and Frank C. Bangs. The following year he began a 12-year association with the Boston Museum working with William Warren, Dion Boucicault, Lester Wallack and other well-known actors of that time. He later appeared in every original Gilbert and Sullivan opera production in America and created the leading roles in the plays Hands Across the Sea, The English Rose and as Kerchival West in Bronson Howard's Civil War play, Shenandoah.

After the death of his mother in 1890, Mason went to London where he found success at the St. James Theatre playing Simeon Strong in C. Haddon Chambers' popular play The Idler. Later back in America, Mason starred for three seasons in an adaptation of the comic opera L'Ami Fritz, with Marion Manola. After a brief foray into vaudeville, Mason returned to the legitimate theater to revive his role in The Idler, and later at the Garrick Theatre playing Col. Moberly in Augustus Thomas' Alabama.

Mason returned to the United States the next year to form the Mason-Manola Company and tour with a revival of L'Ami Fritz. In 1898 he creating the character Horatio Drake in Hall Caine's successful play The Christian, at the Knickerbocker Theatre in New York. In his later years Mason performed in companies headed by Elsie De Wolfe, Daniel Frohman Minnie Maddern Fiske among others. His greatest role came in 1907, playing Jack Brookfield in Augustus Thomas's play The Witching Hour, which had a run of 970 performances. Augustus Thomas once compared Mason to the great French actor Lucien Guitry: "He has all that Guitry has and in addition he has the ability to wear a dress suit and to conduct himself in a salon with the grace of a nobleman."

== Marriage ==
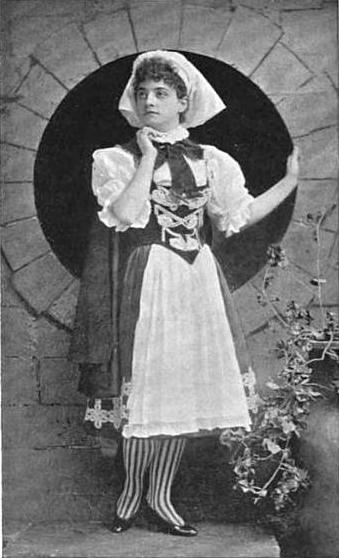
Marion Manola circa 1894

John Mason married actress Marion Manola, on May 1, 1891, in London, England, ending months of speculation in the press. Marion Manola (née Stevens) was a star of comic opera who though born in New York was later raised in Orange, N.J. The couple met in London while she was playing Maid Marian in a musical production of Robin Hood and he was starring in The Idler. Their marriage would prove to be an unhappy affair that began with an injury to her vocal cords. This was compounded by financial set backs due to the failure of the Mason-Manola Company and a mental breakdown she suffered in 1894 that was most likely fueled by alcohol and opium. Though she later recovered, their marriage would end in divorce by the close of the decade. Marion Manola died in 1914 at New Rochelle, New York, after a failed gallstone operation. Adelaide Mould, her daughter from a previous marriage, became the bride of the novelist and playwright Rupert Hughes.

Mason married actress Katherine Grey not long after his divorce from Marion; the same fate that befell this union in 1905. Mason spent some time in the Ludlow Street Jail in 1902 after Marion convinced a judge he was not meeting his alimony obligations. A decade earlier, Mason and his brother Lowell served a brief time behind bars in a dustup over an unpaid bill with a former business partner.

== Death ==
John Mason died on January 12, 1919, at a sanitarium in Stamford, Connecticut. He had fallen ill a few days earlier at Providence, Rhode Island during a premier performance of The Woman in Room 12. Death was attributed to complications from Bright's disease.

== Filmography ==
- Jim the Penman (1915)
- The Fatal Card (1915)
- The Reapers (1916)
- The Libertine (1916)
- Moral Suicide (1918)
