= Marion Manola =

American singer and actress (1865–1914)

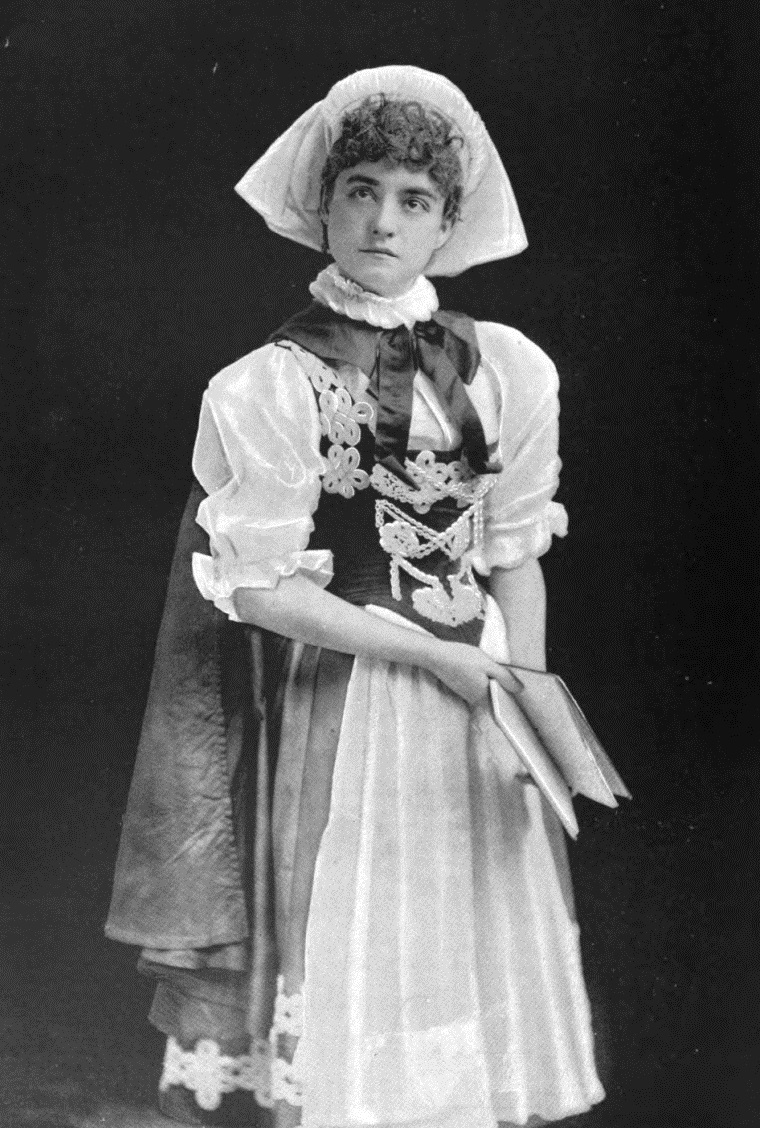
- Manola on-stage in the play Clover, 1887 or 1888
- Born: Marion Stephens (Note: Most sources give her surname as Stephens; The Illustrated American said it was Martins.); 1865; Oswego, New York, U.S. (Note: Manola stated in an interview that she was born in Oswego. Various other published accounts state her place of birth was Cleveland.)
- Died: October 6, 1914 (aged 48); New York City, U.S.
- Occupation(s): Singer, actress
- Spouses: Henry C. Mould, aka Carl Irving (m. 1883; div. 1891) John B. Mason (m. 1891; div. 1900) George G. Gates (m. 1909–1914)
- Children: 1

Marion Manola (1865 – October 6, 1914) was a comic opera singer and actress. Widely popular on stage in the late 19th century, she transitioned to vaudeville in her later career. Newspapers of the time gave a great deal of attention to Manola's personal affairs, avidly documenting her relationships, activities, and illnesses. Manola divorced her first husband to marry popular actor John B. Mason, with whom she frequently performed. Their marriage was marked by illnesses, financial difficulties, substance abuse, and allegations of adultery. After their divorce, she continued to perform sporadically.

Manola famously objected to a surreptitious photograph taken of her on stage in tights. Her successful lawsuit against the photographer is cited in the influential law review article, "The Right to Privacy".

== Early life and career ==
Marion Stephens was born in Oswego, New York, in 1865. She grew up in Cleveland, where she enjoyed participating in local amateur operas. When she was 17 years old, she married Henry C. Mould, a local businessman. Their daughter, Adelaide, was born soon after.

After Mould experienced some business difficulties, the family moved to Europe. Marion, a soprano whose ambition was to sing grand opera, studied in Paris with Mathilde Marchesi for nine months. The couple then moved to England and joined the Lingard and Van Biene's comic opera company. Mould took the stage name of Carl Irving and Marion became Marion Manola. Manola and Irving appeared together in Falka, and they both received positive reviews. Manola was offered a five-year contract with the company, but she turned it down to return to the United States with Mould in 1887. Manola and Irving started at the Casino Theatre in New York. Her initial American performances received poor reviews, so Manola offered the company her resignation and was stunned to have it accepted. She then joined McCaull Opera Company, appearing as Cérise in Erminie. In 1887, she starred as Countess Ulla in Franz von Suppé's comic opera Bellman.

Mould retired from acting in 1888, going into business in the iron industry. In April 1889, Manola filed for legal separation from Mould and requested custody of their daughter. The McCaull company manager said the grounds for the suit was non-support. A friend of Mould's attributed their problems to Manola being hired by the McCaull company while Mould was not, and said Mould would not be willing to give up custody of Adelaide.

During the summer of 1889, Manola appeared in the opera Clover, achieving conspicuous success. The Pittsburgh Dispatch called Manola "the best comic opera prima donna in America". At a time when working girls might earn between $4 and $10 a week, Manola was paid $400 a week. Manola had a reputation for being temperamental. In one incident, she claimed a fellow actor had pushed her on stage, and Manola refused to perform with him again until he apologized.

Manola contracted to appear with the De Wolf Hopper Opera Bouffe Company in 1890, attempting to quit the McCaull Company before her contract with it expired. When she claimed to be ill, McCaull was granted an injunction against Manola to prevent her from singing with any other company until the McCaull contract expired.

== Photographed in tights ==
During a June 14, 1890, performance of the comic opera Castle in the Sky, a photographer surreptitiously took a picture of Manola. She angrily left the stage, while the audience booed at the trick played upon her. Manola explained her objection in an interview:

I have no objection to wearing tights on the stage—that is part of the business of my profession. But I object to being photographed in such a costume. My chief objection is that I have a daughter, only 10 years old, and I don't want her to see pictures of her mother in shop windows in such costumes as I am now wearing.

The company manager, Benjamin Stevens, claimed Manola had been photographed in tights several years earlier while working for him in the McCaull company; the manager also argued that there was no difference between performing in tights and being photographed in tights.

Stevens had engineered the photograph stunt for the publicity that it would bring. In Manola v. Stevens, Manola was granted an interim injunction which restrained the company and the company manager from using her photograph. Manola's case, cited in the 1890 Harvard Law Review article, "The Right to Privacy", by Samuel Warren and Louis Brandeis, was one of the first to assert that an actress had a property right in her own professional image.

== Years with Mason ==
Manola became publicly involved with "Handsome Jack" Mason in 1890. In July, Manola and Mason took a two-week vacation on Mason's yacht, resulting in the De Wolffe Hopper Company discharging Manola, as she had only taken leave for two days. In October 1890, both Mason and Manola broke their performance contracts and disappeared; one acquaintance reported seeing them together in Philadelphia. In November 1890, Manola and Mason announced that they were sailing to Europe.

In 1891, Manola played the lead in Maid Marian, an opera by Reginald De Koven and Harry B. Smith, but it was not a success in England.

The decree nisi for Manola and Mould's divorce was issued in April 1891. Manola and Mason wed at a registrar's office in London on May 1, 1891. The final divorce decree for Manola and her first husband was issued October 23, 1891.

=== Manola's breakdown ===
In 1892, Manola chose William Young's comedy If I Were You to venture into less lyric performances. Several songs were added to the play, however critics felt her musical numbers impeded the play's progress. By 1893, Manola had formed her own company, which produced the play Friend Fritz, starring Manola and Mason; however the production was not a financial success. A lawsuit was filed against the pair, who were arrested on July 14, 1894, then released on bail. At their performance of The Mikado that evening, Manola had difficulty remembering her lines. Manola and Mason were acquitted of the charges on August 8, but Manola continued to be in poor health. Soon after, men attempted to repossess their furniture, which Mason had mortgaged for a loan of $500.

In August 1894, Manola was taken to the Keeley Institute in North Conway, New Hampshire for medical treatment, and she was described as "hopelessly insane", with near total loss of memory. It was said that she spent much of her time in a stupor, while weeping pathetically during her few lucid moments. The New York Times reported that, during the previous year, Manola had used champagne and injections of morphine daily on "the advice of her medical counselors". Mason's brother attributed Manola's condition to the distress caused by their legal troubles. There was speculation in the press that Manola's mental trouble could be attributed to the use of morphine and opium, which Mason's brother firmly denied.

By late 1895, Manola was taking jobs in vaudeville, as was Mason. Manola and Mason agreed to an amicable separation in June 1897. After their separation, Manola made attempts to reconcile, which were rejected by Mason. At one point, she announced that she had filed for divorce in Michigan. At the urging of friends, Mason left New York for an undisclosed location, while Manola tried unsuccessfully to discover his whereabouts. On July 21, 1898, a mutual friend of the couple received a telegram:

In the name of humanity, ask John Mason to at once write, wire or come to Marion Manola. She is rapidly sinking and cannot recover. (Signed) Maud Daniel

The mutual friend declined to provide Mason's address to Manola, in response to the telegram.

=== Problems with Adelaide ===
Adelaide had been educated at Mt. St. Vincent Convent since 1888. When Adelaide was 16, Manola took her from the convent to travel with her and Mason. Adelaide was a source of contention between Manola and Mason; according to Adelaide, Mason resented any time or affection Manola gave to Adelaide.

Manola and Mason's performing company was in Savannah, Georgia, in February 1898. Mason was drinking heavily at this time, and quarreled violently with Manola, upsetting her to the point that she became ill and unable to perform. Adelaide had to perform on stage in her mother's place. The next day, the company manager, Harry Askin, suddenly left for New York with his wife and Adelaide, stranding the rest of the company in Savannah. Manola accused Askin of abducting her daughter and sent a telegram to New York demanding his arrest. On their arrival in New York, Askin was not arrested. In a statement to reporters, Askin alluded to working problems with Manola and Mason and declared that Adelaide had traveled with him on her own volition, which she corroborated.

Willa Cather, then working as a journalist, scooped the other papers by posing as a friend of Manola's to obtain an interview with Adelaide after she had left New York to travel to her father's home. Cather later expressed regret for writing the sensationalistic story and betraying Adelaide's trust.

=== Continued substance abuse ===
Manola was still indulging in alcohol and drugs in 1898, according to her business manager, Maud Daniels, who had attempted to wean Manola from her habits. However, when Manola returned to performing with the Wilbur Opera Company, she resumed a habit of "quarts of whiskey a day" and up to 18 grains of morphine. Daniels put her under constant guard by a physician and nurse. Manola was often too ill to go on stage, and her performances when she did were pitiable. Manola was finally placed in a medical institution for several weeks, before returning to the stage.

The relationship between Manola and Mason was both devoted and destructive. Mason told a friend, "it's she, poor girl, who has never had a lucky day since she met me." By 1900, the New York Supreme Court was hearing Manola's suit for divorce from Mason, naming a 65-year-old widow as co-respondent. Manola's suit also claimed that Mason had addicted her to morphine. Their divorce was granted on April 27, 1900, finding that Mason was guilty of improper conduct with an unknown woman and awarding Manola $25 a week as alimony.

== Later life ==
Manola continued to perform sporadically in the early 1900s, and retired from acting around 1905. In 1904, Manola married George G. Gates, an accountant, and they lived across the street from her ex-husband Mason in New Rochelle, New York.

In October 1914, Manola entered the New Rochelle Hospital for an operation to remove gallstones. Detectives came into her hospital room to arrest her husband for criminal libel. Manola died on October 6.
