= Charles Waldron =

American actor (1874–1946)

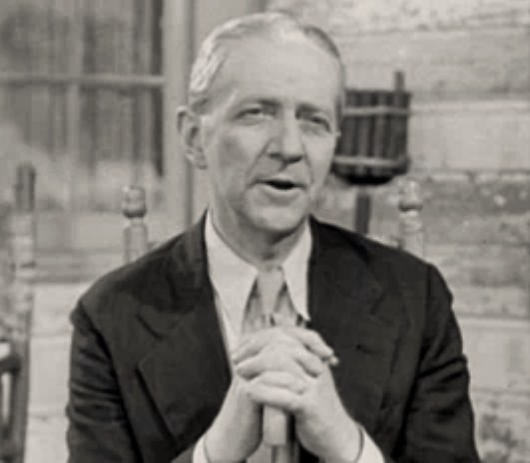
- Waldron in Escape by Night (1937)
- Born: December 24, 1874; Waterford, New York, U.S.
- Died: March 4, 1946 (aged 71); Hollywood, California, U.S.
- Resting place: Forest Lawn Memorial Park, Glendale, California
- Other names: Charles Waldron Sr. Chas. Waldron Sr. Charles D. Waldron; Mr. Waldron
- Occupation: Actor
- Years active: 1907–1946
- Spouse: Alice May King (m. 1907)
- Children: 2

Charles Waldron (December 24, 1874 – March 4, 1946) was an American stage and film actor, sometimes credited as Charles Waldron Sr., Chas. Waldron Sr., Charles D. Waldron or Mr. Waldron.

== Early life ==
He was born and grew up in Waterford, New York. His parents, Mr. and Mrs. George B. Waldron, were themselves actors of some note, but they did not want their son to follow in their profession and tried to steer him to a career in finance. He worked in Philadelphia as a bank clerk. However, he jumped at the chance to "play the juvenile lead in Kidnapped".

== Career ==
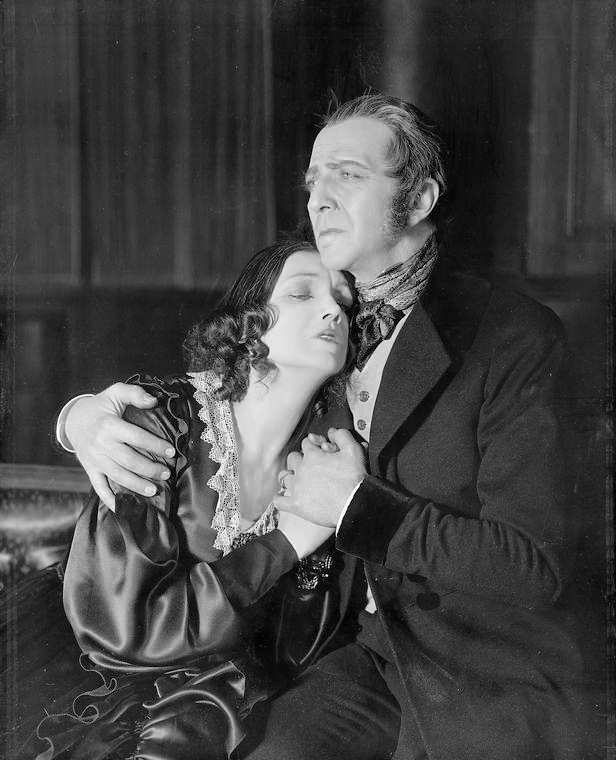
Katharine Cornell and Charles Waldron in the original Broadway production of The Barretts of Wimpole Street (1931)

Nine years of stock and a tour of Australia and New Zealand performing in The Virginian and The Squaw Man followed. In 1905, he was praised for his performance in the leading role in the play The Eternal City at San Francisco's Alcazar Theatre. He made his Broadway debut in 1907 in David Belasco's The Warrens of Virginia. (His father and Belasco had been fellow actors in a Portland, Oregon company.) From 1907 to 1946, he acted in more than 40 Broadway productions in New York City. He played the title role in the original 1914 production of Daddy Long Legs, opposite future film star Ruth Chatterton; both he and Chatterton were highly praised. He performed alongside his son, Charles Waldron Jr., in the latter's debut in Lucrece c. 1932.

Over his long career, he appeared in more than 60 films, starting with the silent film Big Noise Hank (1911). He played U.S. President James Monroe in The Monroe Doctrine, a short film released in 1939. He is perhaps best known for his final film role, that of General Sternwood in the opening scenes of The Big Sleep (1946), starring Humphrey Bogart and Lauren Bacall.

== Death ==
Waldron died, aged 71, in Hollywood, California. He was buried in Forest Lawn Memorial Park in Glendale, California.

== Partial filmography ==
- Big Noise Hank (1911 short) - Julius Jones
- When We Were Twenty-One (1915) - Dick Carew
- Esmerelda (1915 short) - David Hardy
- At Bay (1915) - Capt. Holbrook
- Mice and Men (1916) - Mark Embury
- Audrey (1916) - Lord Haward
- Everyman's Price (1921) - Bruce Steele
- Wanderer of the Wasteland (1935) - Mr. Virey
- Mary Burns, Fugitive (1935) - District Attorney
- Crime and Punishment (1935) - University president
- The Great Impersonation (1935) - Sir Ivan Brunn
- Ramona (1936) - Dr. Weaver
- The Garden of Allah (1936) - Abbe of Monastery (uncredited)
- Career Woman (1936) - Milt Clark
- A Doctor's Diary (1937) - Dr. Ellery Stanwood
- The Emperor's Candlesticks (1937) - Dr. Malchor - a Conspirator
- It's All Yours (1937) - Alexander Duncan
- Escape by Night (1937) - Pop Adams
- It's All Yours (1937) - Mr. Warfield
- Madame X (1937) - President of Court (uncredited)
- Navy Blue and Gold (1937) - Cmdr. Carter
- They're Always Caught (1938 short) - Mayor Fletcher
- Marie Antoinette (1938) - Swedish Ambassador (uncredited)
- The Little Adventuress (1938) - Herkimer Gould
- Kentucky (1938) - Thad Goodwin - 1938
- On Borrowed Time (1939) - Reverend Murdock
- The Real Glory (1939) - The Padre
- The Monroe Doctrine (1939 short) - President James Monroe
- Remember the Night (1940) - Judge in New York
- Women Without Names (1940) - Curtis Lawson (uncredited)
- And One Was Beautiful (1940) - Stephen Harridge
- Dr. Kildare's Strange Case (1940) - Dr. 'Egghead' Squires, Messinger Inst.
- Edison, the Man (1940) - First Commissioner (uncredited)
- Untamed (1940) - Doctor Hughes
- Three Faces West (1940) - Dr. William Thorpe
- Sailor's Lady (1940) - Commander-in-Chief (uncredited)
- Stranger on the Third Floor (1940) - District Attorney
- Street of Memories (1940) - Richard Havens
- The Son of Monte Cristo (1940) - Kurt Mirbach
- The Case of the Black Parrot (1941) - Paul Vantine
- Tobacco Road (1941) - Mr. Lester (scenes cut)
- I Wanted Wings (1941) - Commanding Officer (uncredited)
- The Devil and Miss Jones (1941) - Needles
- The Nurse's Secret (1941) - Dr. Stewart
- Three Sons o' Guns (1941) - Henry Gresham
- Rise and Shine (1941) - President
- Thru Different Eyes (1942) - Doctor Whittier
- The Gay Sisters (1942) - Mr. Van Rennseler
- Random Harvest (1942) - Mr. Lloyd
- The Song of Bernadette (1943) - Bishop of Tarbes (uncredited)
- The Adventures of Mark Twain (1944) - Dr. Quintard (uncredited)
- The Black Parachute (1944) - Erik Dundeen (uncredited)
- Once Upon a Time (1944) - Preacher (uncredited)
- Wing and a Prayer (1944) - Admiral (uncredited)
- Mademoiselle Fifi (1944) - The Curé of Cleresville
- Rhapsody in Blue (1945) - Doctor (uncredited)
- The Fighting Guardsman (1946) - Monsignor at Inn (uncredited)
- Blonde Alibi (1946) - Ship's Officer (uncredited)
- Dragonwyck (1946) - Farmer (uncredited)
- The Big Sleep (1946) - General Sternwood (final film role)

== Broadway credits ==
- The Warrens of Virginia (1907)
- The Fourth Estate (1909)
- Mid-Channel (1909)
- Judith Zaraine (1911)
- June Madness (1912)
- The High Road (1912)
- The Painted Woman (1913)
- The Strange Woman (1913)
- The Dragon's Claw (1914)
- Daddy Long Legs (1914)
- The Woman in Room 13 (1919)
- The Passion Flower (1920)
- Mary Stuart / A Man About Town (1921)
- Swords (1921)
- The Elton Case (1921)
- A Bill of Divorcement (1921)
- A Pinch Hitter (1922)
- The Guilty One (1923)
- Mrs. Partridge Presents (1925)
- Hamlet (1925)
- Magda (1926)
- Pyramids (1926)
- The Heaven Tappers (1927)
- Madame X (1927)
- Coquette (1927)
- Those We Love (1930)
- The Vikings (1930)
- The Barretts of Wimpole Street (1931)
- Electra (1932)
- Lucrece (1932)
- Alien Corn (1933)
- The Pursuit of Happiness (1933)
- Dance With Your Gods (1934)
- Romeo and Juliet (1934)
- The Barretts of Wimpole Street (1935)
- Flowers of the Forest (1935)
- Romeo and Juliet (1935)
- Saint Joan (1936)
- I Am My Youth (1938)
- American Landscape (1938)
- Deep Are the Roots (1945)
