= Handy Andy (1934 film) =

1934 film by David Butler

- Theatrical release poster
- Directed by: David Butler
- Written by: William M. Conselman; Kubec Glasmon; Henry Johnson
- Based on: Merry Andrew by Lewis Beach
- Produced by: Sol M. Wurtzel
- Starring: Will Rogers; Peggy Wood; Mary Carlisle; Robert Taylor
- Cinematography: Arthur C. Miller
- Edited by: Irene Morra
- Music by: David Buttolph
- Production company: Fox Film Corporation
- Distributed by: Fox Film Corporation
- Release date: July 27, 1934
- Running time: 83 minutes
- Country: United States
- Language: English

Handy Andy is a 1934 American comedy film directed by David Butler and written by William M. Conselman, Kubec Glasmon and Henry Johnson, adapted in turn from the play Merry Andrew by Lewis Beach. The film stars Will Rogers, Peggy Wood, Mary Carlisle, Paul Harvey, Frank Melton and Roger Imhof. The film was released on July 27, 1934, by Fox Film Corporation.

== Synopsis ==
A small town pharmacist is pressured by his social-climbing wife to sell his business to a much larger chain of shops. In addition she tries to encourage a marriage between their daughter and the son of the tycoon, despite the fact that she is in love with the Lloyd the son of the town physician.

== Cast ==
- Will Rogers as Andrew Yates
- Peggy Wood as Ernestine Yates
- Mary Carlisle as Janice Yates
- Paul Harvey as Charlie Norcross
- Frank Melton as Howard Norcross
- Roger Imhof as Doc Burmeister
- Robert Taylor as Lloyd Burmeister
- Grace Goodall as Mattie Norcross
- Jessie Pringle as Jennie
- Conchita Montenegro as Fleurette
- Adrian Rosley as Henri Duval
- Gregory Gaye as Pierre Martel
- Richard Tucker as Mr. Beauregard
- Helen Flint as Mrs. Beauregard

== Reception ==
The film was one of Fox's biggest hits of the year.

== Bibliography ==
- Solomon, Aubrey. The Fox Film Corporation, 1915-1935: A History and Filmography. McFarland, 2011.
