= Katherine Grey (actress) =

American actress

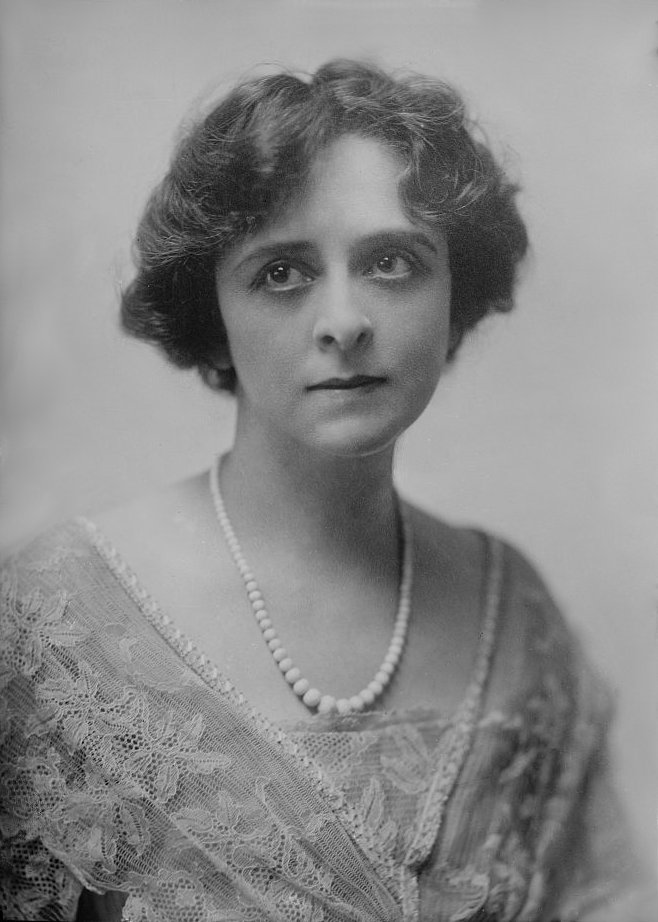

Katherine Grey (born Katherine Best; 27 December 1872 – 21 March 1950) was an American stage actress. Born and raised in San Francisco, California, she began her career as a member of Augustin Daly's theatre troupe in the 1889-1890 season. She worked primarily on the New York stage and had a career on Broadway from 1889 into the 1940s. She also performed in American regional theaters. After the death of her first husband, Paul Arthur, she married actor John B. Mason.

== Early life and education ==
Katherine Grey was born with the name Katherine "Kate" Best in San Francisco, California on 27 December 1872. She was educated at the Zeitska Institute in San Francisco where she graduated from the elementary school division in 1882 at the age of 9. She made her stage debut in her native city at the age of 14 at the Baldwin Theater; performing in T. W. Robertson's 1869 comedy School which was staged to raise funds for the Pacific Dispensary for Women and Children (then known as Children's Hospital) in February 1887. The following June she graduated from the Denman Grammar School. After this she attended Girls High School.

As a teenager Katherine was involved in community theatre in San Francisco. In March 1888 she portrayed May Rivers in the play Wither Leaves in an amateur production staged at Saratoga Hall. This play was repeated soon after at a community event sponsored by the Young Men's Institute of San Francisco at the Grand Opera House. In April 1888 she portrayed the wife in Augustin Daly's A Woman's Won't in an amateur performance given at Irving Hall in San Francisco, and the following month she portrayed Emilia in Othello in an amateur performance given at the Grand Opera House. Some other plays she performed in as an amateur in San Francisco included Juliet in Romeo and Juliet (1888), and the Fool's daughter in Tom Taylor's The Fool's Revenge (1888).

== Career ==
In August 1889 it was announced that Kate Best had joined Augustin Daly's theatre troupe. She joined the joined the company over the objections of her family. She initially worked under her own name as an understudy in the company and was assigned her first role in The Golden Widow. After performing with Daly's company in San Francisco, she portrayed Lou Bigelow in The Golden Widow for her first Broadway appearance at Daly's Theatre in October 1889. She remained a member of Daly's company until the end of the 1889-1890 season with her other repertoire including the part of Phemie in A Priceless Paragon. In April 1890 she joined the cast of Shenandoah at Proctor's Twenty-Third Street Theatre;{ a production for which she was billed for the first time under the stage name of Katherine Grey. It remained her pseudonym from this point on.

In October 1890 Grey replaced Marie Greenwald in William Gillette's All the Comforts of Home at Twenty-Third Street Theatre. This was followed by the role of Lucy Norton in Harry Nicholls and William Lestocq's Jane at the Madison Square Theatre in 1891. In 1893 she portrayed the roles of Kate Fessenden in Clay M. Greene's The New South at the Broadway Theatre and Helen Berry in Shore Acres at the Fifth Avenue Theatre. In 1894-1895 season Grey toured as a member of Richard Mansfield's theatre troupe in which she portrayed the roles of Louka in Bernard Shaw's Arms and the Man, Marcella in Octave Feuillet's A Parisian Romance, Princess Zea in Mansfield's The King of Peru, Marie Walewska (sometimes spelled Marie Valouski) in Napoleon, and Agnes Carew in Thomas Russell Sullivan and Mansfield's Dr. Jekyll and Mr. Hyde. Some of these plays were performed on Broadway, including appearances as Marie Valouski at the Herald Square Theatre in 1894, and performances at the Garrick Theatre as Louka and Princess Zea.

In 1895 Grey created the role of Mary Lavelot in Edward M. Alfriend's The Great Diamond Robbery at the American Theatre). This was followed by the parts of Lydia Ransom in A Southern Romance (1897, Fifth Avenue Theatre), and Celia Pryse in The Royal Box (1898, Fifth Avenue Theatre). In `1905 she performed in The Firm of Cunningham at Hoyt's Theatre), and in 1906 she portrayed Adulola in The Redskin at the Liberty Theatre). Her work outside the United States included two years in Australia. By April 1914, Grey had been the leading lady for more male stars than any other actress then living.

Grey had a notable success on stage as the leading female with The Goose Hangs High (1924), which ran for six months on Broadway during 1924, and was cited as one of The Best Plays of 1923-24. One of her final appearances was as Mrs. Lacroix in Ferenc Molnár's A Delicate Story at Henry Miller's Theatre in 1940.

On August 10, 1891, Grey married actor Paul Arthur in New York. After his death, she married actor John B. Mason. She died on March 21, 1950, in Orleans, Massachusetts.
