= Lewis Beach (playwright) =

American playwright (1891-1947)

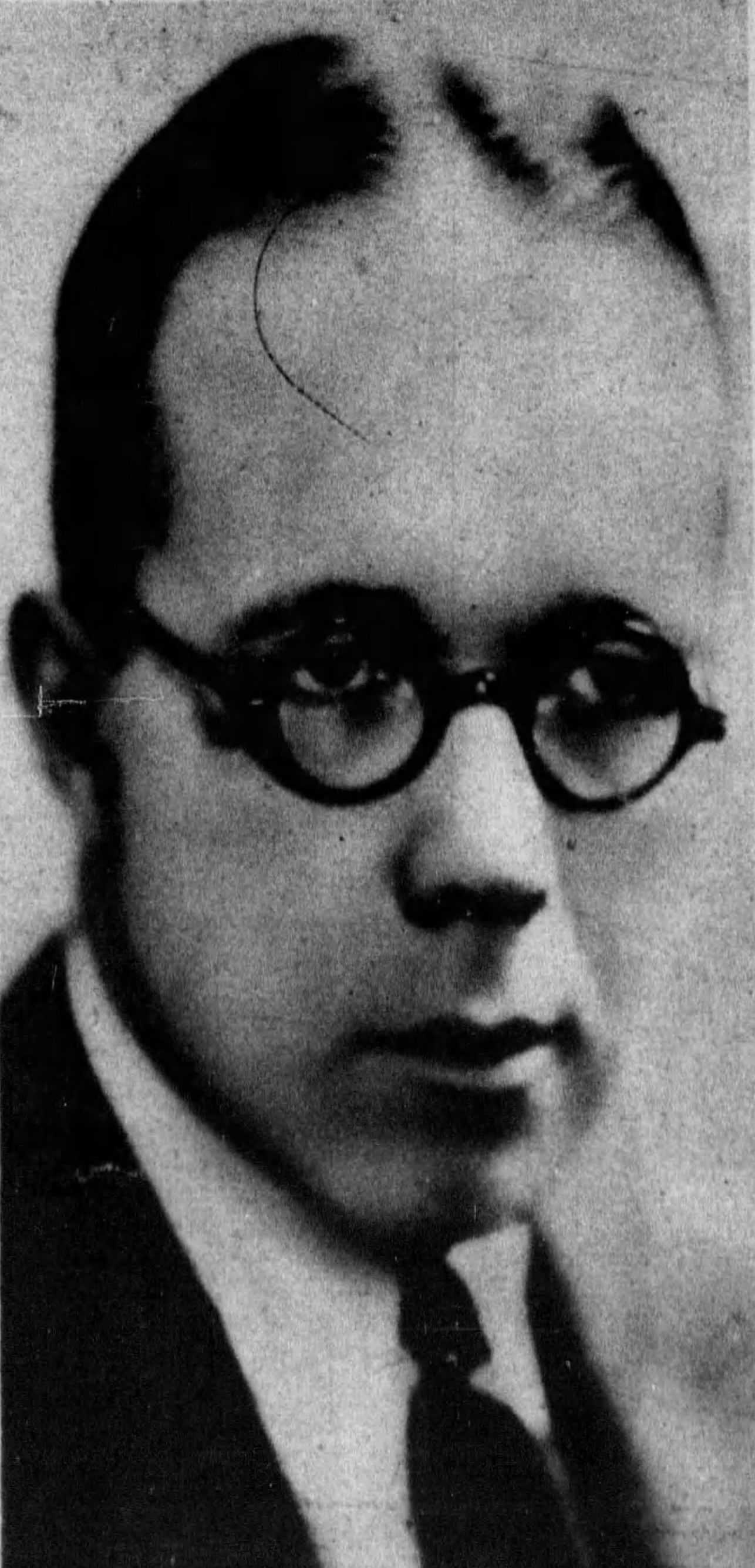
- 1924
- Born: Emmet Lewis Beach, Jr; June 18, 1891; Saginaw, Michigan
- Died: September 1, 1947 (aged 56); Point Lookout, Arenac County, Michigan
- Education: Harvard University A.B., M.A. University of Chicago (attended)
- Occupation: Playwright
- Years active: 1913-1947
- Known for: The Goose Hangs High

Lewis Beach (June 18, 1891 – September 1, 1947) was an American playwright and author, who started writing plays while a student at Harvard University. His first success was a one-act play called The Clod which was performed by the Washington Square Players in 1916 and later became a staple of vaudeville and Little Theater. His three-act drama, A Square Peg, was produced on Broadway during 1923, and adapted for the 1925 silent film The Denial. He followed that with a comedy called The Goose Hangs High, a hit production for the Dramatists' Theatre, Inc., included with The Best Plays of 1923-24, and adapted into a silent film. Other produced plays he wrote included In a House Like This, and Merry Andrew, which was adapted into the 1934 film Handy Andy. His psychological drama, Candle to the Sun, was awarded the Charles H. Sergel prize in 1944. He had just finished another play when he died unexpectedly in September 1947.

== Early years ==
He was born Emmet Lewis Beach Jr on June 18, 1891, (Note: Some sources list a birth year of 1892, but his 1891 baptismal certificate, the 1900 US Census and his 1917 draft registration card, all point to the earlier year.) in Saginaw, Michigan, the elder child of Emmet Lewis Beach Sr, and Leah Beach. He had one sibling, a younger brother named Robert S. Beach. (Note: Robert Stanley Beach (1895-1946) was a World War I veteran who became an attorney and later served as counsel for the federal government's Reconstruction Finance Corporation. The brothers were close, as evidenced by Lewis Beach dedicating the published version of The Goose Hangs High to him.) His father was an attorney and circuit court judge in Saginaw, who also was president of a small bank, and the Point Lookout Navigation Company. His mother, the former Leah Dudgeon, was a public school teacher. Beach was raised in Saginaw, in a household that included two other school teachers: his aunt Rebecca Dudgeon, and Jessie Loomis, the latter who had boarded with his parents for many years and was evidently a strong influence on Beach. (Note: Beach dedicated his 1924 published play Ann Vroome to Loomis. His will contained a provision for his executors to move her remains to a grave plot near his.) Beach graduated from Saginaw High School in June 1909.

== College ==
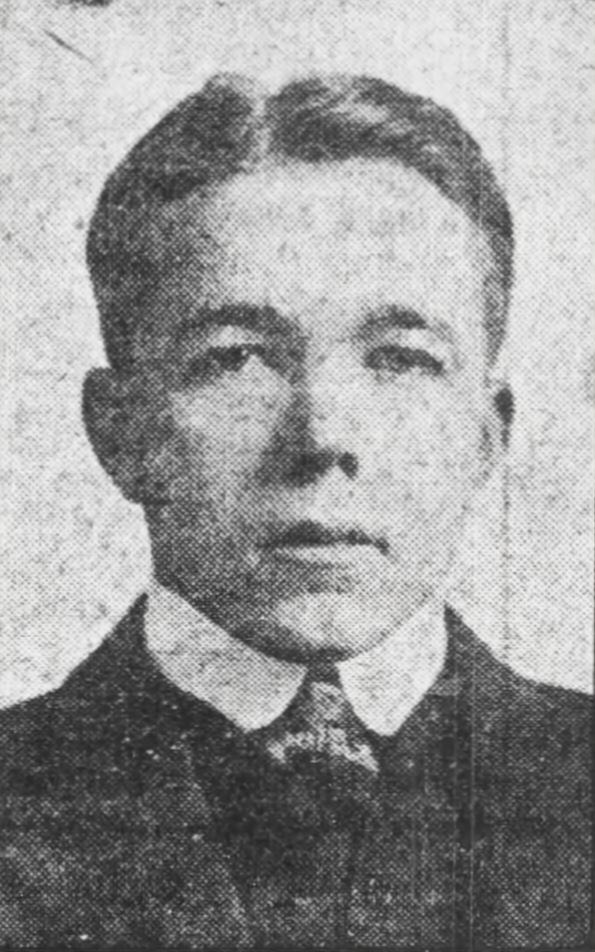
1913

Beach entered the University of Chicago during September 1909, intending to become a drama critic. (Note: That his parents agreed to and paid for such a career goal at an expensive private university is telling of their relationship.) While at Chicago he joined the Blackfriars student dramatic society, and performed in a student-written satiric operetta called The Pseudo-Suffragettes during May 1910.

By 1911, Beach had transferred to Harvard University. During that year he wrote to Professor Donal Hamilton Haines at the University of Michigan, requesting permission to adapt his short story, The Least of These, for the stage. Permission was granted, and the dramatic adaptation became The Clod. Beach graduated from Harvard with an A.B. degree in June 1913, but returned in the fall to take Professor George Pierce Baker's English 47 Playwriting Workshop. It was for this class he wrote a three-act satire called Let's Get Married. This tale of a triple elopement by college students was chosen for the fall performance of the Harvard Dramatic Club and presented in December 1913. Beach also wrote dramatic criticism for Boston-area newspapers.

Beach reworked his earlier adaptation of The Clod, a stark one-act melodrama set in the border states during the American Civil War, for Baker's workshop. It was performed by the Harvard Dramatic Club for its Spring 1914 presentation, both on campus and at Copley Hall, Boston. This work was to be Beach's breakthrough to professional success, but its first reception went unreported in Boston papers. After receiving an M.A. in June 1914, Beach spent two years teaching at Radcliffe College.

== Early career ==
=== The Clod ===
The Washington Square Players (WSP) specialized in performing one-act plays of literary merit without regard for commercial appeal. They performed The Clod, along with other works, starting January 10, 1916 at the Bandbox Theatre in Manhattan. Heywood Broun noted that though the other works were popular with the critics, the audience responded most to The Clod.

“It was well worth all the self-indulgent experimentation of the lighter pieces, well worth all the misplaced concession to stock whimsicality and humor, to have made so fortunate a production as The Clod. If comedy fails it is like a slip in dancing. One risks humiliation. But if tragedy fails one endangers everything. It is like a slip of the surgeon's knife. And that failure, so common in the lacerating, scarring productions of the Grand Guignol, is beautifully avoided in Mr. Beach's short play, The Clod.”
– Francis Hackett on The Clod

Synopsis: The story occurs in a border state during September 1863, and is played entirely by moonlight and lamplight, so the players are often in shade and silhouette. It centers around a sixty-year-old worn-out farm wife, Mary Trask, who labors continually to keep house and farm going for herself and her indolent husband Thad. A wounded Union soldier stumbles into her kitchen one evening, fleeing pursuit by rebels. She is unsympathetic to either side, her only concern getting enough sleep to start work again tomorrow. He hides before her husband sees him, so when a Rebel sergeant and private demand he be surrendered, Thad knows nothing about it. The sergeant is coarse and aggressive, mocking the laconic Mary as stupid and a hag, and threatening to kill her and Thad. But when he inexcusably breaks a China teacup, the only thing of beauty in her life, she takes her husband's rifle and kills him and the private. The Union soldier tries to thank her, but she only muses about having to drink from a tin cup hereafter.[24]

The bill upon which The Clod appeared ran through March 1916, giving time for the playlet to be revisited by audiences and critics. A week into its run, Alexander Woollcott called it an "excruciatingly tense little melodrama" and said "They play it by moonlight, with the prospect of immediate gunfire continuously suspended, like the Sword of Damocles, over the head of the jumpy playgoer". A full-page review of the WSP bill by Francis Hackett in The New Republic was especially laudatory towards The Clod, claiming it justified the experiment that was the WSP.

The WSP again ran The Clod during the summer of 1916 at their new home in the Comedy Theatre, where it attracted the attention of much larger audiences. By August, the performing rights had been purchased by the Keith Vaudeville Circuit, which signed Sarah Padden to play the title role. She would perform The Clod on the vaudeville circuit for two years, providing Beach with a stream of royalties that would later be enhanced by Little Theater and college productions.

=== Other one-act plays ===
Beach wrote a one-act play in 1916, titled A Guest for Dinner, (Note: This is a melancholy tale of a wealthy old man who never leaves his house anymore. His snobbish son is at once controlling and neglectful, and lives permanently at a club. When a down-at-heels old classmate tempts him out into a vagabond lifestyle, his butler tricks him into staying home by claiming his son is coming to visit.) which had a Little Theatre performance at the Aldis Playhouse in Lake Forest, Illinois on August 4, 1916. Beach was present, and himself took part in another one-act play, America Passes By by Kenneth L. Andrews.

His rural dark comedy Brothers was written in 1918, and first performed by the Provincetown Players in December 1920. It is a duologue between shiftless brothers waiting for their pa to die, only to find he has left everything to their estranged mother. Beach also wrote Love Among the Lions in 1919, which he labelled as a farce. A domestic comedy, it features the battling egos of a married couple, a concert pianist and an opera tenor. It does not appear to have ever been produced, though it was published with his other playlets in 1921.

== Broadway years ==
=== A Square Peg ===
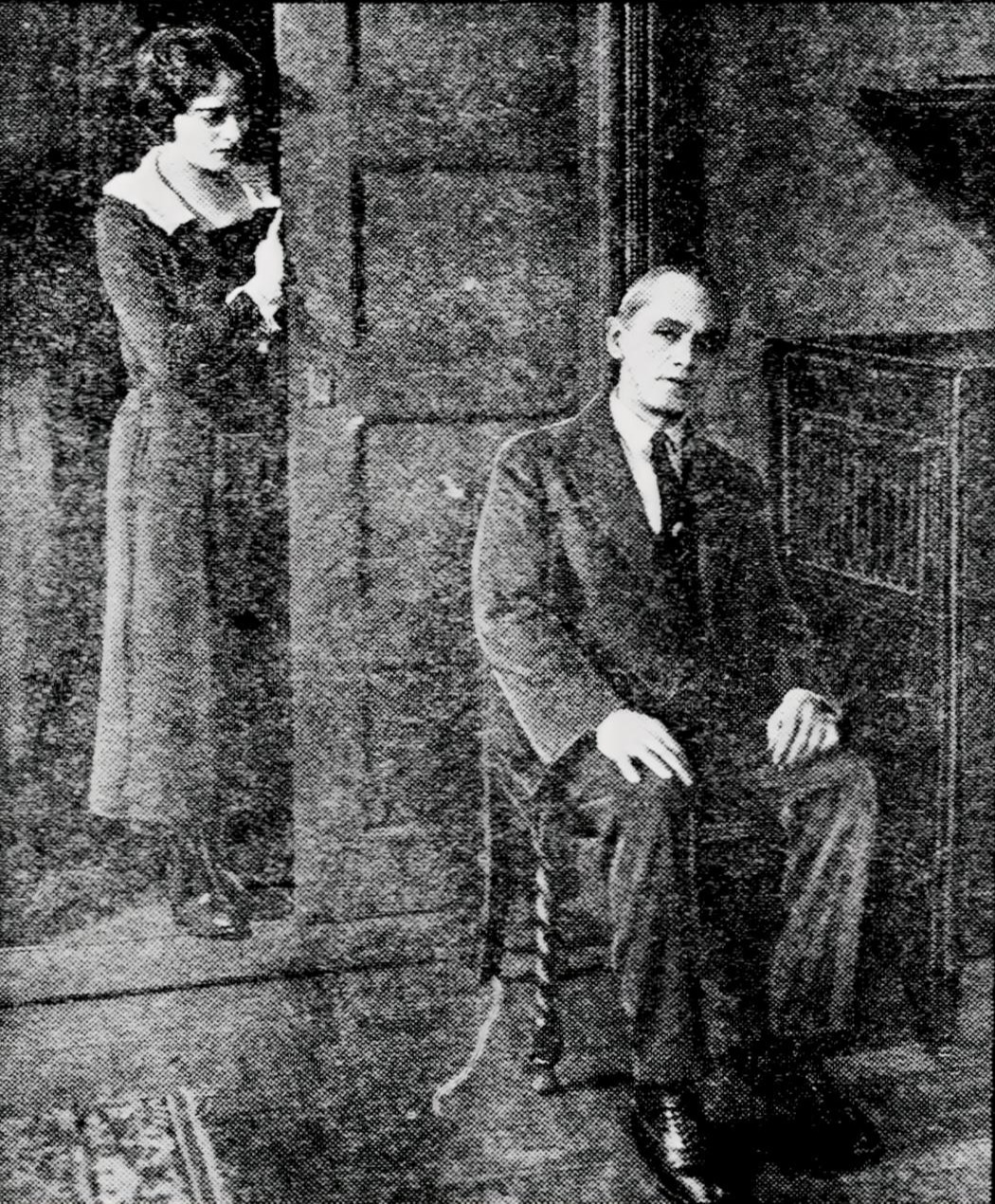
'A Square Peg' (1923)

Beach returned to Broadway with a three-act domestic tragedy about a Midwestern family. A Square Peg was written in 1921, but did not find a producer until Guthrie McClintic picked it up in late 1922. Rehearsals began January 9, 1923; Guthrie McClintic staged the production with assistance from Lewis Beach. There was no tryout and very little advance notice when this work premiered at the Punch & Judy Theatre on Saturday, January 27, 1923. The play starred Beverly Sitgreaves, with William B. Mack, Leona Hogarth, and Walter Abel in the supporting roles.

Synopsis: The story concerns the Huckins family, whose matriarch Ruth Huckins is a relentless organizer and efficiency expert, whom the playwright suggests is a generation ahead of her time. She lacks the traditional maternal virtues of nurture and healing, and her family pays the price. The father James T. Huckins embezzles money to buy a farm in Canada to get away from her, and her son Eugene becomes involved with an unsuitable girl after Ruth drove away his real love. Ruth makes good the debt James owes, and pays off the father of the girl, but Eugene escapes his mother by enlisting in the navy. Ruth having thwarted his prospects of finding some peace in jail, James shoots himself, while daughter Mildred runs off with a married man. Ruth is left alone at the end to ponder the ingratitude of her family to her efforts to improve their lives.[38]

The play received favorable notices from critics, who were doubtful of its popular appeal. Burns Mantle praised the production and cast, but thought director Guthrie McClintic must be trying to "disprove the oft-stated fact that American playgoers do not enjoy having their feelings harrowed or their common and petty faults exposed". James Stetson Metcalfe was impressed with Beach's "close and almost inspired study of an ordinary American family", but thought it would have gained more renown and public acceptance if it was foreign in origin. Ludwig Lewisohn said "there is no American play this season as fine as A Square Peg". A Square Peg lasted five weeks on Broadway, closing March 3, 1923. It was adapted for the 1925 silent film The Denial.

=== The Goose Hangs High ===
Beach's second full-length play for Broadway was again a Midwestern family study, this time as a comedy. Produced by the Dramatists' Theater, Inc., an organization of six established playwrights, The Goose Hangs High premiered on Broadway in January 1924 and ran through to July 1924. Careful casting and staging by James Forbes was credited for some of its success, but the characters and their humorous conversations were the main appeal. The story of overgenerous parents and spendthrift adult children, who transcend their selfishness to rescue the folks from a financial crisis, won critical and popular approval. The Goose Hangs High was included with The Best Plays of 1923-24, and from 1924 onwards would replace The Clod as an exemplar whenever Lewis Beach was mentioned in the press. It was adapted for a 1925 silent film of the same name, and a 1932 sound film called This Reckless Age.

=== Other plays ===
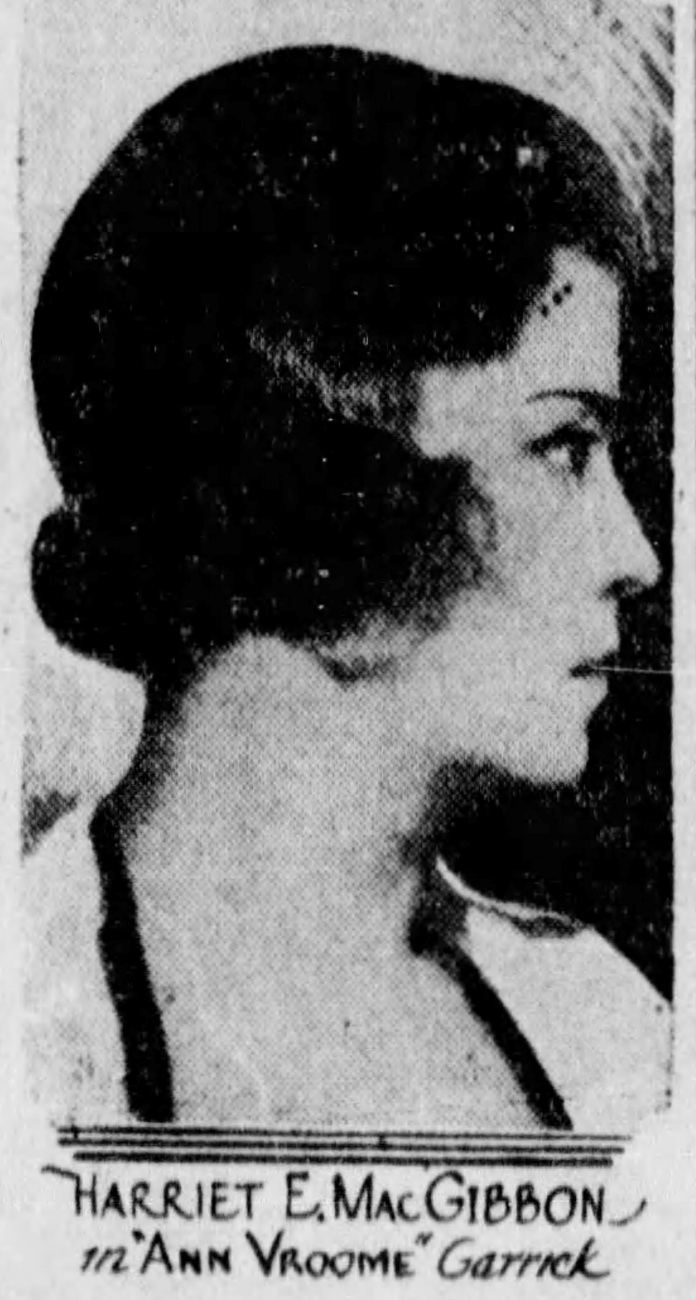

Ann Vroome, often referred to as Ann Vroom, was written in 1922, and reportedly sold while A Square Peg was still running on Broadway during February 1923. The purchaser was Sam H. Harris; the play was published in March 1924. George C. Warren wrote in the San Francisco Chronicle that "Beach follows the lead of the naturalists, and in Ann Vroome has chosen the 'expressionistic' form of drama, with its many scenes and swift moving tale...". It comprised seven scenes spread over as many years, as the titular heroine sacrifices her youth and chance for marriage to take care of her aging parents. Though there were many announcements of its impending production, Ann Vroome was not performed until Pauline Lord gave it a tryout in Philadelphia during July 1930. Lord played the title role, with G. P. Huntley Jr., Wyrley Birch, and Harriet MacGibbon in support. Technical difficulties with set changes made for a long first night, and despite the play's literary merit, "the audience was apathetic".

During November 1924, newspapers reported that Guthrie McClintic had called rehearsals for another Lewis Beach play, titled Chattels, with Blanche Bates in the leading role. However, after two weeks of rehearsals, McClintic suddenly switched the entire cast to Mrs. Partridge Presents. Nothing more is heard of Chattels, while Mrs. Partridge Presents by Mary Kennedy and Ruth Hawthorne premiered January 5, 1925.

Gene Buck announced in February 1927, that he would be mounting a production of Airs, I Say, Airs by Lewis Beach. That July, a play by Beach called The Lady Wears Laurels was produced by the Lakewood Players of Skowhegan, Maine, for Rosalie Stewart. Howard Lindsay directed the work, while Martha Hedman led the cast. Lewis Beach was present for rehearsals. Reviewer Helen Havener said the first night audience was large and had many members from New York City. She judged the story treaded the line between comedy and farce in dealing with a concert violinist, who tries to guide the destiny of her daughter. Another local reviewer said the chief character played by Martha Hedman was unconvincing, and ascribed blame equally to the playwright and the star. They also faulted the play's construction for presenting no real drama and telegraphing the outcome of what little did occur.

=== Merry Andrew ===
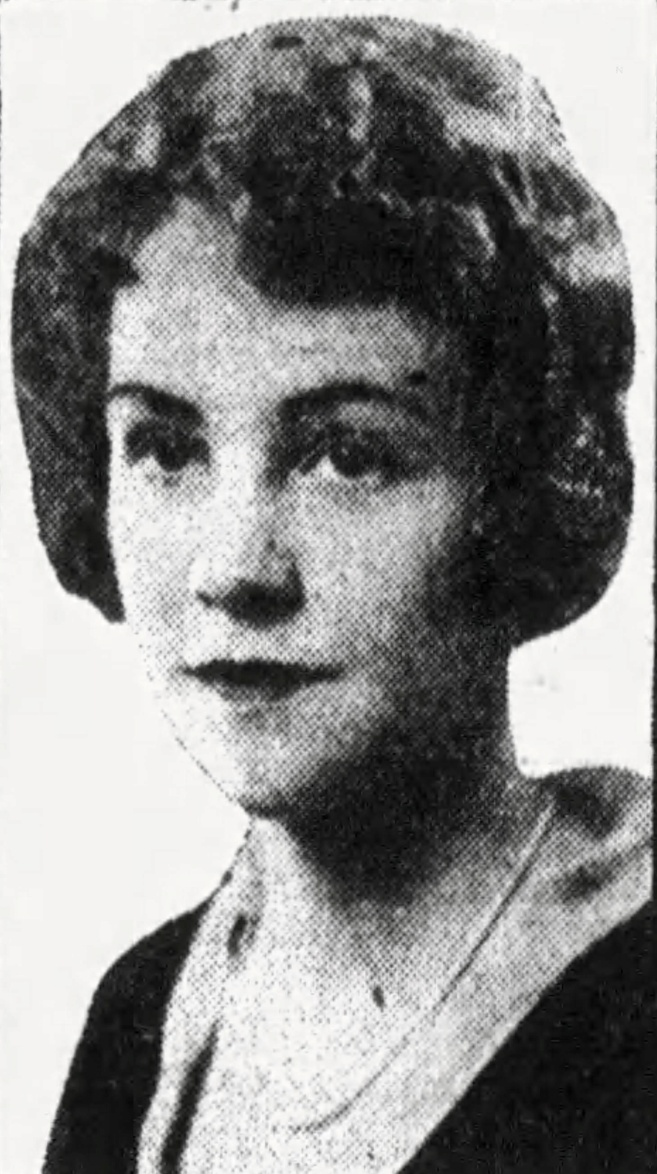
Ellen Dorr

The original copyright for this comedy dates it to 1925, but it wasn't produced until January 1929. This was to be the last play by Lewis Beach to appear on Broadway, put on by Laurence Rivers, Inc. (Note: There was no Laurence Rivers; this production company was created and owned by a stock broker named Rowland Stebbins.) The play was staged by John Hayden, with assistance from Beach, and sets by Livingston Platt. It was a three-act comedy, with five scenes and two settings. The story concerned a pharmacist who is urged by his wife and daughters to retire early at age 60, but who within three months is plaguing his family by his constant irritating presence. After a week-long tryout at Nixon's Apollo Theatre in Atlantic City, New Jersey, Merry Andrew had its Broadway premiere at the Henry Miller Theater on January 21, 1929.

Three of the four actors performing principal roles had appeared in the tryout for The Lady Wears Laurels during July 1927. These were Walter Connolly as the title character, a pharmacist named Andrew Aiken, with Nedda Harrigan and Ellen Dorr as his daughters. Rounding out the principals according to Alison Smith was "a skillful, faintly satirical study by Effie Shannon of the sweet-faced woman with the brave, patient smile which has driven so many husbands to homicidal madness". Arthur Pollock said that in Merry Andrew, the author "faces the problem of picturing an uneventful life without permitting his play to seem without event, and he does not quite succeed".

Burns Mantle wrote "Beach is confessedly a sentimentalist. He like to see his play people high-principled and stanchly true to the better American home standards". Mantle insisted Merry Andrew contained "excellent comedy" provided by a skillful cast, but was weakened by an obvious ending. Brooks Atkinson agreed, saying "Mr. Beach writes an affable comedy of character in which the conclusion is, by mutual consent, foreordained". Merry Andrew closed on February 9, 1929, after just three weeks.

== Later works ==
During the short run of Merry Andrew, it was reported that Lewis Beach had finished a new play called Cocktails. There is then a gap of many years before his next known work, a psychological drama called Candle to the Sun, which was copyrighted in 1937. Beach submitted it in 1943 for the nationwide Charles H. Sergel prize administered by the University of Chicago. The judges, George Abbott, Bramwell Fletcher, and Cecil Smith, awarded the top prize to Candle to the Sun in May 1944.

In a House Like this, a sequel to The Goose Hangs High, was published in April 1940. It was performed that same year by high schools and a Little Theater company, and received a semi-professional production in Los Angeles during May 1941. Katherine Von Blon called it "a feathery, light comedy" and thought it was "overwritten" and "repetitious", but "the character drawing is excellent".

== Death and bequests ==
Beach owned a cabin at Point Lookout in Arenac County, Michigan, where he often went to write in seclusion. Junius Sanford, the owner of a local grocery store, had not seen Beach for several days which was unusual. Calling at his cabin on Wednesday, September 3, 1947, Sanford found Beach dead and summoned the county sheriff, Edgar Shaffer. Coroner Clare Forshee said the death likely occurred on Monday, September 1, 1947. The Sheriff and Coroner told newspapers the death was from natural causes. (Note: The death certificate issued for Beach indicated his death occurred at "About 11pm" on September 1, 1947, with immediate causes listed as "Excess Inebreation" [sic] and "Over dose of Aspirin".) The Sheriff added that the manuscript of Beach's latest work was found wrapped up and addressed to his publisher.

His will was admitted to probate on September 24, 1947. A provision in it left $1000 to establish a scholarship for any student at Saginaw High School with dramatic talent or theatrical interest. Beach willed the literary rights for The Clod to Professor Donal Hamilton Haines at the University of Michigan, while all other royalty rights went to his mother Leah Beach. Another bequest found in Beach's will drew attention for its unusual conditions. His extensive personal book collection, kept in storage in New York City, was bequeathed to the Hoyt Library in Saginaw, so long as none "be destroyed or rejected because of the prudishness of a librarian or some clubwoman". The Hoyt Library trustees rejected the bequest outright, without ascertaining the size or value of Beach's book collection.

== Plays ==
- Let's Get Married (1913) Three-act satire.
- The Clod (1914) One-act melodrama.
- A Guest for Dinner (1916) One-act drama.
- Brothers (1918) One-act rural black comedy, first produced by the Provincetown Players in 1920.
- Love Among the Lions (1919) One-act farce, published in 1921 but never produced.
- A Square Peg (1921) Three-act drama, produced on Broadway during January 1923.
- Ann Vroome (1922) Domestic drama in seven scenes, not produced until 1930.
- The Goose Hangs High (1923) Three-act comedy, produced on Broadway during January 1924.
- Chattels (1924) Purchased by Guthrie McClintic, it started rehearsals but was abandoned after two weeks.
- Merry Andrew (1925) Three-act comedy, produced in January 1929.
- Airs, I Say, Airs (1926) Purchased by Gene Buck, but never published nor produced.
- The Lady Wears Laurels (1927) Produced by Rosalie Stewart for a one-week tryout in August 1927.
- The Patsy (1927)
- Cocktails (1929) Known only from a newspaper report.
- Candle to the Sun (1937), Psychological drama, awarded Charles H. Sergel prize in May 1944.
- In a House Like This (1940), Sequel to The Goose Hangs High, produced in Los Angeles during May 1941.
- The Flaming Sword (1947), His last work, completed just before his death. Never published nor produced.

== Published work ==
- Washington Square Plays (1916) Contains The Clod and three other works by different authors.
- Four One-Act Plays (1921) Contains The Clod, A Guest for Dinner, Love Among the Lions, and Brothers. (Note: Dedicated to his parents.)
- A Square Peg: A Play in Three Acts (1924). Originally copyright 1921. (Note: Dedicated to Guthrie McClintic and Katharine Cornell.)
- Ann Vroome: A Play in Seven Scenes (1924). Originally copyright 1922. (Note: Dedicated to Jessie Loomis.)
- The Goose Hangs High: A Play in Three Acts (1924). Originally copyright 1923. (Note: Dedicated to his younger brother, Robert S. Beach.)
- Merry Andrew: A Comedy in Three Acts (1930). Originally copyright 1925. (Note: Dedicated to Russell Thurston Fry.)
- In a House Like This (a Sequel to 'The Goose Hangs High') (1940).

== Bibliography ==
- Lewis Beach. Four One-Act Plays. Samuel French, 1921.
- Lewis Beach. A Square Peg: A Play in Three Acts. Little, Brown, and Company, 1924.
- Lewis Beach. Ann Vroome: A Play in Seven Scenes. Little, Brown, and Company, 1924.
- Lewis Beach. The Goose Hangs High: A Play in Three Acts. Little, Brown, and Company, 1924.
- Lewis Beach. Merry Andrew: A Comedy in Three Acts. Samuel French, 1930.
- Lewis Beach. In a House Like This (a Sequel to 'The Goose Hangs High'). Samuel French, 1940.
- Burns Mantle (ed). The Best Plays of 1923-24 And The Year Book Of The Drama In America. Dodd, Mead & Company, 1924.
