= The Goose Hangs High (play) =

1923 play by Lewis Beach

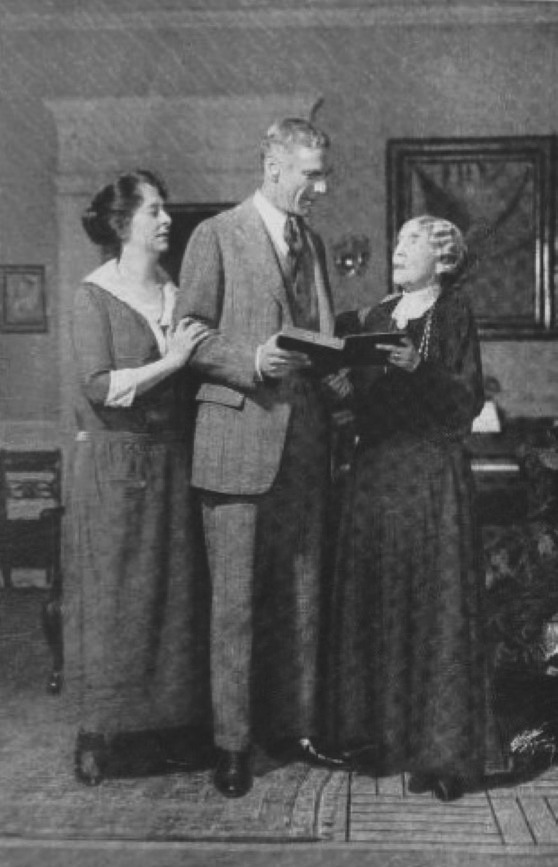
- Katherine Grey, Norman Trevor, Blanche Whiffen
- Original language: English
- Written by: Lewis Beach
- Subject: Family love proves stronger than adversity
- Genre: Comedy
- Setting: A living room in a Midwestern city

Premiere
- Date: January 29, 1924
- Place: Bijou Theatre
- Directed by: James Forbes

The Goose Hangs High is a 1923 play by Lewis Beach. It is a three-act comedy with a single setting, and thirteen principal characters. The action of the play takes place over a weeks time in a Midwestern city. The story concerns generous parents whose three adult children do not realize their precarious financial position but then come to their rescue. The title comes from an old American expression meaning "everything's going good and likely to continue well".

The play was produced by the Dramatists' Theatre, Inc., staged by James Forbes, with sets designed by Livingston Platt. It starred Norman Trevor and Katherine Grey, with Mrs. Thomas Whiffen in support. It had a two-day tryout in Stamford, Connecticut during January 1924, followed immediately by the Manhattan premiere. It ran for just over five months on Broadway, ending in July 1924 after 194 performances. Burns Mantle included it in his compilation of The Best Plays of 1923-24.

The Goose Hangs High was adapted for a 1925 silent film of the same name, now lost, and a 1932 movie called This Reckless Age.

== Characters ==
Characters are listed in order of appearance within their scope.

Lead

- Bernard Ingals is 51, with a boyish air but firm ethics; he is City Assessor, and loves horticulture.
- Eunice Ingals is in her late forties, Bernard's engaging wife. The Ingals live in her childhood home. (Note: Eunice's late father, Roger Bradley, was a power in local politics.)

Supporting

- Mrs. Bradley called Granny, is a widow in her 70's; she is Eunice's mother and landlord.
- Hugh Ingals is 29, the Ingals' first-born, who lives in New York. Confident and hearty.
- Lois Ingals is the Ingals' only daughter, now a junior at a nearby college, interested in advertising.
- Bradley Ingals Called Brad, is twin brother to Lois, a junior at Harvard, interested in scenic design.

Featured

- Noel Derby is 51, a bachelor, the Ingals' close friend, and like Bernard, a devotee of horticulture.
- Rhoda is the Ingals' middle-aged servant, who no longer works fulltime due to their penury.
- Leo Day is 33, just elected to the city council; a self-made man, uncouth and socially ambitious. (Note: Exposition reveals he grew up in the local Catholic orphanage, which he left at thirteen to start work. He is ruthless and unethical, but not a complete villain. He is awed at extended political families like the Bradleys.)
- Julia Murdoch is in her early 50's, a well-off cousin of Bernard, and friends with Eunice.
- Ronald Murdoch is 27, Julia's adult son, a discontented clerk at his father's bank.
- Dagmar Carroll is Hugh's fiancée, who lives in New York but whose wealthy family is local.
- Elliott Kimberly is 50, a large aggressive city councilman, corrupt and tyrannical, out to get Bernard.

Bit player, voice only, and canine

- Clem is Lois' hometown beau, who earns her disfavor by proposing too soon.
- Sid is a friend of Brad who drives him to a dance.
- Mr. Holding is a next door neighbor who walks Granny home.
- Dazzler is the twins' dog who is seen briefly in Act I.

== Synopsis ==
The story take place at the Ingals' colonial style home in a Midwestern city with a population of 100,000.

“LOIS. Didn't you know, Hugh? Brad belongs to the school of 'scene-wrights' that want eventually to do away with actors entirely.
BRADLEY. That's Gordon Craig. I don't go as far as he does. But symbolism's everything.
HUGH. Symbolism and the scene-painter.
LOIS. His gang's only interest is in giving more prominence to the scene-dauber.
BRADLEY. How can the theater advance when we have to deal with people like you?”
– From Act I of The Goose Hangs High

Act I (The Ingals' living room. About 5pm on December 23rd.) Bernard and Eunice are preparing for their younger children's homecoming from college for Christmas. Noel Derby suggests to Bernard they buy a market garden business and turn it into a nursery. Leo Day drops by to pressure Bernard into sponsoring him at the local country club. Bernard stalls him by inviting him to dinner later that week. Julia Murdoch escorts Granny Bradley home from shopping. Granny and her both scold the Ingals for indulging their kids. Julia spills the news of Hugh's engagement to Dagmar Carroll. Hugh surprises everyone by his unexpected return from New York. Pandemonium ensues when the twins arrive home a day early. Ronald Murdoch takes his mother Julia home. Lois says she will continue with marketing her senior year, while Brad discusses his summer plans for studying scene design. Both take it for granted their parents will be subsidizing them. Bernard mentions the trouble he is having with the new city councilmen. Hugh confesses his engagement, and says he and Dagmar will soon marry and move into a Manhattan apartment. Hugh makes good money and has savings, but does not know of his parents precarious finances. All three children rush off to a holiday dance, leaving their parents to dine alone. (Curtain)

Act II (Same as Act I. About 8pm on December 29th.) Hugh and Dagmar discuss future plans then leave for dinner at Dagmar's, though Hugh was supposed to dine at home. More, he left his mother to walk home in the rain instead of picking her up downtown. Lois also skipped dinner, having spent hours with a local department store owner suggesting improvements to his advertising. Lois explains she has secured a place in an expensive residence for her coming semester and will need more money. Clem comes for Lois and Granny goes next door to the Holding's. Bernard tells Brad about his troubles with Kimberly, how he fired his longtime stenographer and put a girlfriend in the job. Brad, without a date, expresses sympathy for D. H. Lawrence's theory of women. For the first time, Bernard and Eunice doubt their approach to child rearing. Kimberly calls on Bernard to demand an apology for his girlfriend, whom he says feels insulted by Bernard. Throwing Kimberly out, Bernard writes his resignation and addresses it. Before he can stop him, Brad takes it to mail on his way to a dance. Telling Eunice what he's done, Bernard tries to get ahold of Brad to stop the letter. He is horrified when Brad telephones home and Eunice tells her son to mail it. She won't let Bernard be tormented or corrupted. When Granny returns, Eunice asks to borrow money, and explains why. But Granny refuses a loan, if they are going to spend it on the twins. Eunice and Bernard go for a walk. Granny calls Hugh at Dagmar's and has him round up the twins. (Quick curtain)

An hour has gone by; when Hugh, Lois, and Brad come in, Granny bluntly tells them their father has lost his position and is bankrupt. After agonizing over their selfishness, they take action. Hugh writes his parents a check, the savings on which he was to marry. Lois sends a telegram cancelling her college dormitory reservation. Brad, knowing it was Kimberly who provoked the crisis, goes over to his house and beats him up. When Bernard and Eunice return from their walk, the kids explain they know the situation and have taken steps. (Curtain)

Act III (Same as Act I. Morning of December 30th.) Bernard still refuses Hugh's check. Dagmar has come to breakfast and secured Eunice's approval. When he gets Dagmar alone, Hugh explains their marriage must wait. Dagmar agrees to the postponement until Bernard gets back on his feet financially. Eunice outrages Granny by offering the twins' bedrooms for rent, since Hugh's money will send them back to college. But the twins refuse to go back; Lois has taken a job with the department store, while Brad will do scenery for the local stage theatre. They go to work on Granny, pointing out how ashamed she would be to have her son-in-law working menial jobs. Gradually they lead her into investing her money with Noel Derby for a nursery business, with Bernard as manager. Noel and Granny go upstairs to work out the deal. But Bernard startles everyone by saying Leo Day has saved his job by refusing the resignation. Eunice tells Bernard she will divorce him if he goes back to City Hall. Stunned, he is forced to acquiesce to Granny's offer, which Noel says the twins' dreamed up. Hugh's money is returned, allowing him and Dagmar to marry, as the twins refuse to go back to college; the entire family celebrates their love and loyalty. (Curtain)

== Original production ==
=== Background ===
Lewis Beach was a student in Professor George Pierce Baker's English 47 playwriting workshop at Harvard University when he wrote his first one-act drama. Ten years and two Broadway plays later, his comedy The Goose Hangs High was selected for the first production of the newly formed Dramatists' Theatre, Inc. The title comes from an old American expression: "Everything is lovely and the goose hangs high", the word "hangs" being thought a corruption of "honks". It refers to the old belief that geese fly higher in fair weather, hence the saying predicts a good outlook.

The Dramatists' Theatre, Inc. was a group of six established playwrights: Owen Davis, James Forbes, Cosmo Hamilton, William Anthony McGuire, Arthur Richman, and Edward Childs Carpenter. They were organized to produce plays of "high merit", and decided to produce a play by an outsider for their first project. James Forbes was chosen to stage The Goose Hangs High and Livingston Platt to do scenic design. By January 13, 1924, the cast was announced and a tryout in Washington, D.C. scheduled for January 28, 1924. But a Broadway theatre became available earlier than expected, so the Washington tryout was scrubbed, while Raymond Hackett was replaced by Eric Dressler in the latest cast list.

=== Cast ===
Cast from the Stamford tryout through the Broadway run.
Role	Actor	Dates	Notes and sources
Bernard Ingals	Norman Trevor	Jan 24, 1924 - Jul 05, 1924	
Eunice Ingals	Katherine Grey	Jan 24, 1924 - Jul 05, 1924	
Granny Bradley	Mrs. Thomas Whiffen	Jan 24, 1924 - Jun 28, 1924	This was the 300th character role she had played during her stage career.
Granny Bradley	Julia Stuart	Jun 30, 1924 - Jul 05, 1924	Stuart took over from Whiffen when the latter decided to take a vacation.
Hugh Ingals	John Marston	Jan 24, 1924 - Jul 05, 1924	
Lois Ingals	Miriam Doyle	Jan 24, 1924 - Jun 21, 1924	Doyle left the production for a vacation.
Lois Ingals	Kathleen Middleton	Jun 23, 1924 - Jul 05, 1924	Middleton, who was the female understudy for the cast, took over from Doyle.
Brad Ingals	Eric Dressler	Jan 24, 1924 - Jul 05, 1924	
Noel Derby	William Seymour	Jan 24, 1924 - Jul 05, 1924	
Rhoda	Florence Pendleton	Jan 24, 1924 - Jul 05, 1924	
Leo Day	Purnell Pratt	Jan 24, 1924 - Mar 29, 1924	Pratt was co-opted for the Dramatists' second production, The Rabbit's Foot by Rida Johnson Young.
Leo Day	TBD	Mar 31, 1924 - Jul 05, 1924	
Julia Murdoch	Lorna Elliott	Jan 24, 1924 - Jul 05, 1924	
Ronald Murdoch	Geoffrey Wardwell	Jan 24, 1924 - Jul 05, 1924	
Dagmar Carroll	Shirley Warde	Jan 24, 1924 - Jul 05, 1924	Warde submitted her play What's the Use to a contest for American actors.
Elliott Kimberly	Harry Cowley	Jan 24, 1924 - Jul 05, 1924	

=== Tryout ===
The Goose Hangs High had a two-day tryout at the Stamford Theatre in Stamford, Connecticut, starting January 24, 1924. The reviewer for the Stamford Advocate said it was a message for parents worried over their children's superficial oddities of behavior and attitude. They saluted the performances of Norman Trevor and Katherine Grey, and especially that of Mrs. Thomas Whiffen.

=== Broadway premiere and reception ===
The play had its Broadway premiere at the Bijou Theatre on January 29, 1924. The reviewer for the Brooklyn Standard Union said "it is not a very weighty theme" but easily put across, where audience favor would naturally gravitate to the younger characters. They complimented Miriam Doyle and Eric Dressler for their whirlwind twins, but were inconsistent about the presentation, at one point saying it had "excellent staging" and at another "the play appeared to have been hastily put together". Arthur Pollock agreed The Goose Hangs High had a good though unoriginal theme, but he decried the sentimentality of Lewis Beach: "The play is deluged with loving kindness, knee-deep. Everybody slops all over everybody else, except grandma". Pollock gave the slightest of praise to Shirley Warde, Miriam Doyle, and Eric Dressler, but otherwise summed up the acting as "No one shines particularly", while director James Forbes was accused of "cluttering" up the stage with extraneous "business".

John Corbin, referencing an earlier work of the playwright, said: "From the rather acid realism of The Square Peg Mr. Lewis Beach has progressed or declined to an amiable and optimistic comedy of a family loyalty and affection". Corbin said the cast was "flawless" and James Forbes' staging of the exuberant homecoming scene with the twins and dog was a "little masterpiece" of direction. Burns Mantle was unapologetic about liking the happy ending of The Goose Hangs High, attributing it to Lewis Beach being an optimist and American: "A foreigner would have thrown the family, or a major part of it, on the rocks for a smash". He praised the Dramatists' Theatre, Inc. for the production, James Forbes for the staging, Livingston Platt for the sets, and all the actors for their performances.

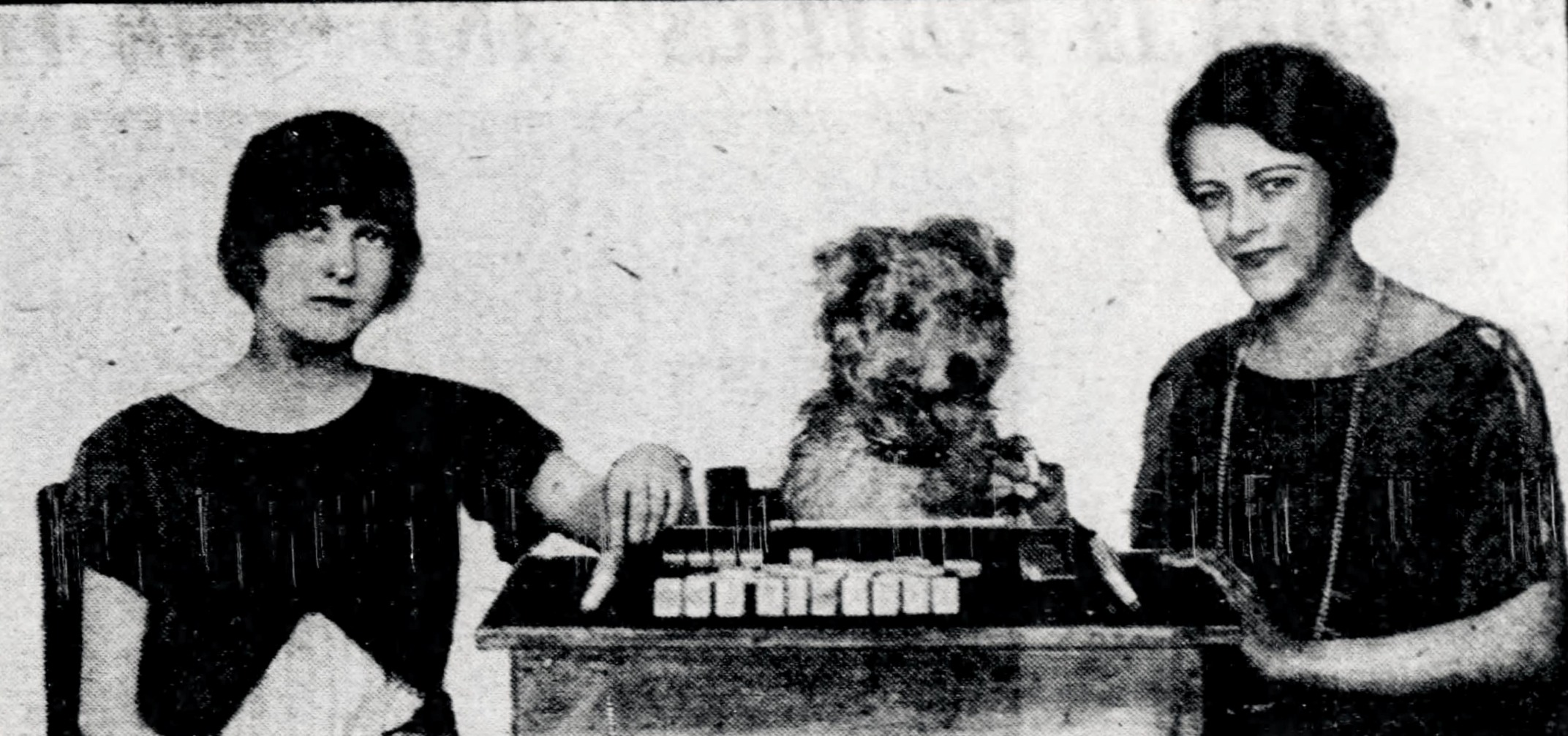

The Dramatists' Theater, Inc. was an independent production company, not a member of the Producing Managers' Association (PMA), and so were not affected by the looming end of the contract between the PMA and the Actors' Equity Association (Equity) on June 1, 1924. Though a new contract was negotiated, ongoing productions under the old contract were forced to shut down until the new contract was implemented. The Goose Hangs High, which had recently celebrated its 150th performance, continued on without interruption into June 1924.

Burns Mantle included The Goose Hangs High in his compilation of The Best Plays of 1923-24.

=== Broadway closing ===
The Goose Hangs High closed at the Bijou Theatre on July 5, 1924. Burns Mantle said it had 159 performances, which does not square with his newspaper's earlier report of 150 on May 28, 1924, and the production's continuance into July. (Note: The actual number of performances was 194: There were 150 on May 28, 1924, 4 more to finish that week, and 40 for the remaining five weeks of production.)

== Adaptations ==
=== Film ===
- The Goose Hangs High (1925) - Silent film directed by James Cruze, starring Constance Bennett, Myrtle Stedman, and Esther Ralston.
- This Reckless Age (1932) - Adapted by Joseph L. Mankiewicz, and directed by Frank Tuttle, this "snappy" version starred Charles "Buddy" Rogers, with Richard Bennett, Peggy Shannon, Charles Ruggles, Frances Dee, and Frances Starr.

== Bibliography ==
- Lewis Beach. The Goose Hangs High: A Play in Three Acts. Little, Brown, and Company, 1926.
- Burns Mantle (ed). The Best Plays of 1923-24 And The Year Book Of The Drama In America. Dodd, Mead & Company, 1924.
