= The Denial =

1925 film

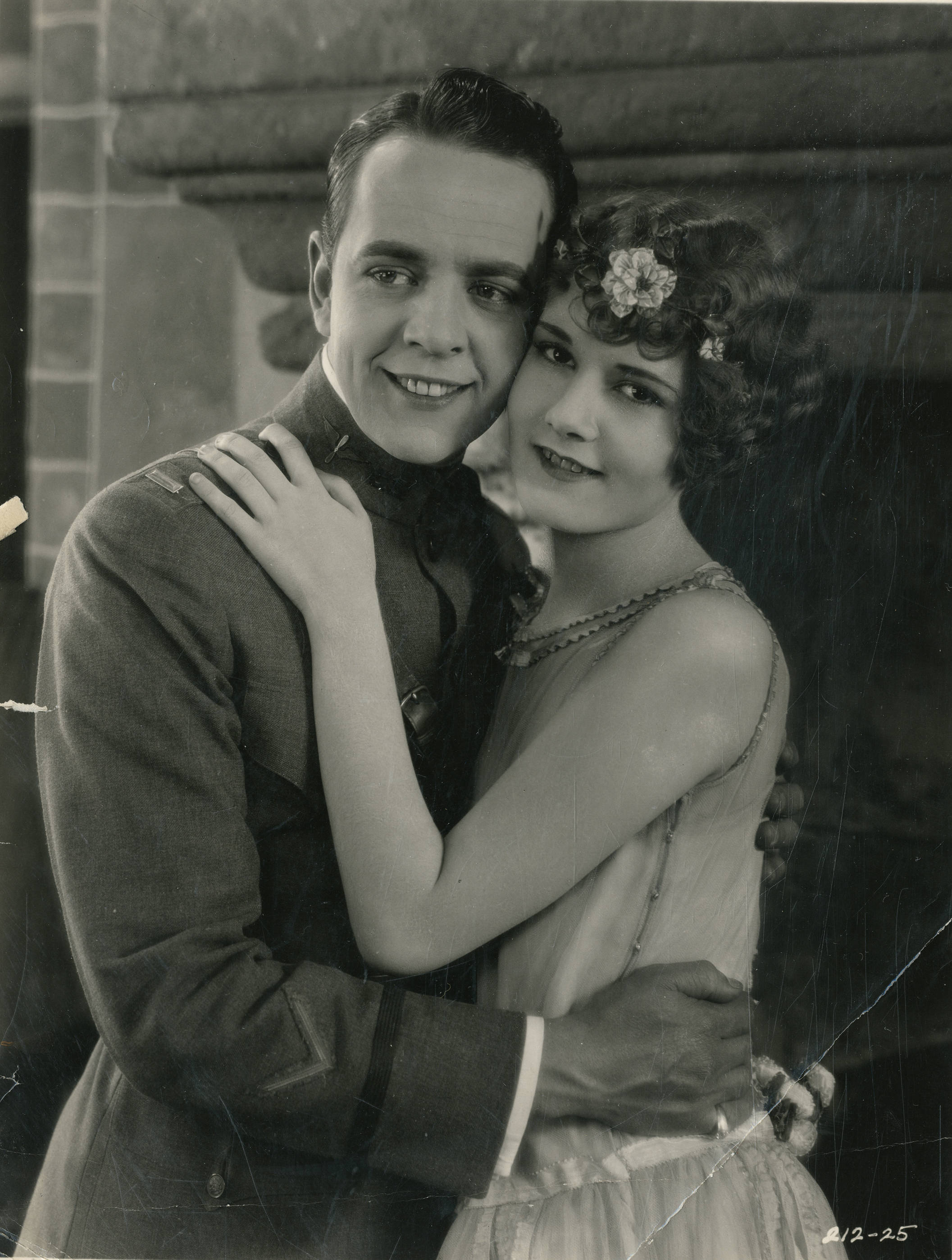
- Film still
- Directed by: Hobart Henley
- Written by: Agnes Christine Johnston
- Based on: A Square Peg, a 1923 play by Lewis Beach
- Starring: Claire Windsor; Bert Roach; William Haines; Lucille Ricksen; Robert Agnew
- Cinematography: Benjamin F. Reynolds
- Edited by: Frank Davis
- Distributed by: Metro-Goldwyn-Mayer
- Release date: March 22, 1925 (United States)
- Running time: 50 minutes
- Country: United States
- Language: Silent (English intertitles)

The Denial is a 1925 American silent drama film directed by Hobart Henley. The film stars Claire Windsor, Bert Roach, William Haines, Lucille Ricksen, and Robert Agnew. The film was written by Agnes Christine Johnston based on the play A Square Peg (1923) by Lewis Beach.

Lucille Ricksen died of tuberculosis the same month this film was released.

== Plot ==
As described in a film magazine review, a Mother tries to direct the affections of her daughter as she sees fit. When her daughter rebels, she realizes how such domination spoiled her own life and she allows her daughter to marry the man of her choice, a young officer. The Mother's similar history from years past is presented in flashbacks.

== Cast ==
- Claire Windsor as Mildred, the Mother
- Bert Roach as Arthur
- William Haines as Lyman, the Lover in flashback
- Lucille Ricksen as Dorothy, the daughter
- Robert Agnew as Billie, the Young officer
- Emily Fitzroy as Rena, Mother in flashback
- William Eugene as Eugene
- Estelle Clark as Rosie
- Vivia Ogden as Effie
- Edward Connelly as James Huckins

== Preservation ==
A partial print of The Denial is in the collection of the George Eastman Museum.
