= Belmont Theatre =

Former theatre in Manhattan, New York

Coordinates: 40°45′33″N 73°58′55″W

The Belmont Theatre, also known during its existence as the Norworth Theatre and the Theatre Parisien, was a Broadway theatre located at 125 W. 48th St in Midtown Manhattan, New York City. It was designed by architect Eugene De Rosa and opened in 1918. Originally owned and operated by Jack Norworth, the theatre changed hands a few times before the building was ultimately demolished in 1951.

== History ==
Designed by architect Eugene De Rosa, the theatre was originally named the Norworth Theatre, and was named for its builder, the songwriter and actor Jack Norworth (best known for writing the lyrics to "Take Me Out to the Ball Game" and "Shine On, Harvest Moon"). Norworth built the theatre with the intent of managing it and using it as a place for he and his wife, the actress Nora Bayes, to perform. The theatre opened on January 28, 1918, with the musical revue Odds and Ends of 1917; a production which had transferred from the Bijou Theatre. Both Northworth and Bayes starred in the production along with the comedian Harry Watson Jr. and actress Lillian Lorraine.

Norworth's tenure as the operator and owner of the theatre was short lived, and he sold it just four months after it opened. Under its new owners, the theatre was renamed the Belmont Theatre with its first performance under its new name being Theresa Helburn's Crops and Croppers on September 12, 1918.

It was active as a Broadway theatre from 1918 through 1933. It went dark in August 1933 after a revival of St. John Greer Ervine's John Ferguson closed. It did not reopen again until 1936 when it was active for one more year before being sold in 1937. It then operated as a movie theatre, mainly showing foreign language film, until 1951 when the building was demolished.

== Design ==
The theatre had a little more than 500 seats, making it one of the smallest Broadway theatres. The exterior featured a brick facade with large lanterns mounted over arched windows. It had an orchestra section, two proscenium boxes, and a single balcony. The interior design included wall murals and oak, blue, and gold furnishings.
