= This Reckless Age =

1932 film

- Directed by: Frank Tuttle
- Written by: Lewis Beach (play The Goose Hangs High); Joseph L. Mankiewicz (screenplay)
- Produced by: Jesse L. Lasky; Adolph Zukor
- Starring: Charles "Buddy" Rogers
- Cinematography: Henry Sharp
- Music by: John Leipold
- Distributed by: Paramount Pictures
- Release date: January 9, 1932
- Running time: 80 minutes
- Country: United States
- Language: English

This Reckless Age is a 1932 American pre-Code comedy film directed by Frank Tuttle and starring Charles "Buddy" Rogers and produced and distributed by Paramount Pictures. The film is based on a Broadway play The Goose Hangs High by Lewis Beach.

The film is one of over 700 Paramount films controlled by Universal Pictures, which in 1948 purchased most of the 1928-1948 Paramount library.

== Plot ==
Donald and Eunice Ingals' lives revolve around their children, Bradley and Lois. They have sacrificed and scrimped to give their kids the best, and the kids, thoughtless and young, give little in return except for a smile and thanks now and then.

When Christmas vacation comes, Bradley and Lois pop in on the family. Bradley has come to tell his father he is marrying Mary Burke, which is received rather badly by both parents, while Lois, prankish and impish, spends more of her visit home partying with school friends.

But when Donald finds himself being blamed for a business scandal, the children make serious efforts to save their father's reputation.

== Cast ==
- Charles "Buddy" Rogers as Bradley Ingals
- Richard Bennett as Donald Ingals
- Peggy Shannon as Mary Burke
- Charles Ruggles as Goliath Whitney
- Frances Dee as Lois Ingals
- Frances Starr as Eunice Ingals
- Maude Eburne as Rhoda
- Allen Vincent as Pig Van Dyke
- Mary Carlisle as Cassandra Phelps
- David Landau as Matthew Daggett
- Reginald Barlow as Lester Bell
- George C. Pearce as John Burke
- Grady Sutton as Stepladder Schultz
- Harry Templeton as Monk Turner
- Berton Churchill as Banker
- Leonard Carey as Braithwaite (uncredited)

== Critical reception ==
Mordaunt Hall of the The New York Times observed that there were significant changes made in the adaptation from the play, The Goose Hangs High, but commented that the end result "is for the most part quite entertaining … thanks … to some good acting, especially by Richard Bennett, Charles Ruggles, Frances Starr and Maude Eburne." He wrote positively of the younger players, and commented, "Charles (Buddy) Rogers is good-looking as Bradley, but there is not much, to tax his acting talent in this rôle. Frances Dee does exceedingly well as Lois, and Peggy Shannon is believable as Mary Burke."

Variety wrote that what the film lacked in drama, it made up for in "an abundance of sentimentality" played by "a flawless cast." Frances Starr’s performance was described as "engaging" and the reviewer commented, "Young 'Buddy' Rogers does one of the neatest, if least important, bits of juvenile playing of his career, while the two younger women of the cast (Peggy Shannon and Frances Dee) make two contrasting examples of the flap type, the former a rather conventional figure and the latter a sometimes scatter-brained hoyden."

Reviewer Clara M. Sawdon opined in International Photographer: "Pictures such as this are rare because they are much more difficult to produce than sensational or spectacular ones, but they are welcome innovations, especially when accomplished with such satisfactory coordination of effort as herein evidenced."

Lionel Collier, for the British magazine, Picturegoer, wrote, "Modern youth and its ways have come in for a good bit of criticism. This film attempts to vindicate the present day younger generation in America." He found the story "rather too slow" but with a "pleasant tone, sound in moral outlook." He complimented the two younger performers, Buddy Rogers and Frances Dee, but felt Richard Bennett was "inclined to overact", which Collier attributed to his extensive stage career.
