= The Warrens of Virginia (1924 film) =

1924 film by Elmer Clifton

- Directed by: Elmer Clifton
- Written by: William C. de Mille
- Based on: The Warrens of Virginia by William C. de Mille
- Produced by: Fox Film Corporation
- Starring: Martha Mansfield, Wilfred Lytell
- Distributed by: Fox Film Corporation
- Release date: October 12, 1924
- Running time: 7 reels
- Country: United States
- Language: Silent (English intertitles)

The Warrens of Virginia was a 1924 American silent drama film directed by Elmer Clifton, that is now lost. It was produced and distributed by Fox Film Corporation.

== Plot ==
As described in a review in a film magazine, Burton (Lytell) and Agatha Warren (Mansfield) were childhood sweethearts and grew up together. At the start of the Civil War, Burton becomes a Lieutenant in the Union Army while all of Agatha’s family are on the confederate side. After four years of fighting, a situation arose where General Lee’s confederate army was dependent upon the arrival of a supply train. The Union general, urging patriotism, persuades Burton to carry a false message when he goes to call on Agatha, arranging with a spy so that Burton would be captured by Confederate forces. The scheme works, the train is captured, and Lee surrenders to end the war. Furious at his perfidy, and considered as a spy, the Confederates led by Hill Buzzard take Burton out to be hanged. Agatha, although incensed at Burton, rides to get help. Burton is placed on his horse and a noose placed around his neck. The Confederates intend to drive his horse from under him, but the horse refuses to budge though severely beaten, giving time for the rescue party summoned by the heroine to arrived and save Burton. Five years later, Burton returns, Agatha forgives him, and they find happiness together.

== Cast ==
- George Backus as General Warren
- Rosemary Hill as Betty Warren
- Martha Mansfield as Agatha Warren
- Robert Andrews as Arthur Warren
- Wilfred Lytell as Ned Burton
- Harlan Knight as Pap
- James Turfler as Danny
- Helen Ray Kyle as The Little Reb
- Wilbur J. Fox as Ulysses S. Grant
- J. Barney Sherry as Robert E. Lee
- Frank Andrews as General Griffin

== Production ==
The film was shot in San Antonio, Texas. Brackenridge Park doubled as a battlefield at Appomattox.

Martha Mansfield was on the set when her period hoop dress caught fire, possibly from a discarded match. She died at a hospital the next day. Most of Mansfield's scenes had been shot, so production of the film continued.

== Preservation ==
With no prints of The Warrens of Virginia located in any film archives, it is a lost film.

== See also ==
- The Warrens of Virginia (1915 film)
- List of films and television shows about the American Civil War
