= The Warrens of Virginia (1915 film) =

1915 film

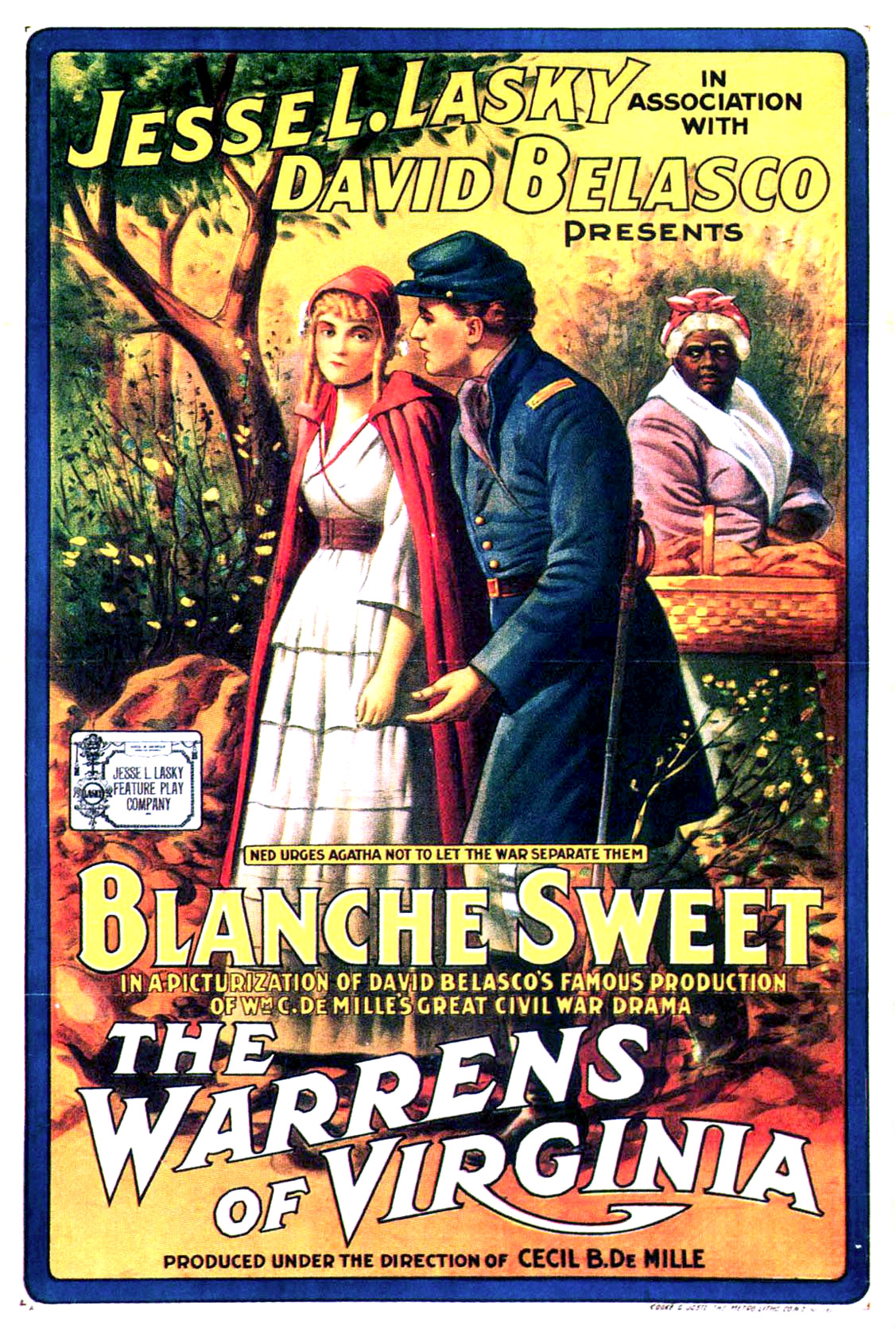
- Film poster
- Directed by: Cecil B. DeMille
- Written by: William C. de Mille
- Produced by: Cecil B. DeMille; Jesse Lasky; David Belasco
- Starring: Blanche Sweet
- Cinematography: Alvin Wyckoff
- Edited by: Cecil B. DeMille
- Distributed by: Paramount Pictures
- Release date: February 15, 1915
- Running time: 50 minutes
- Country: United States
- Language: Silent (English intertitles)

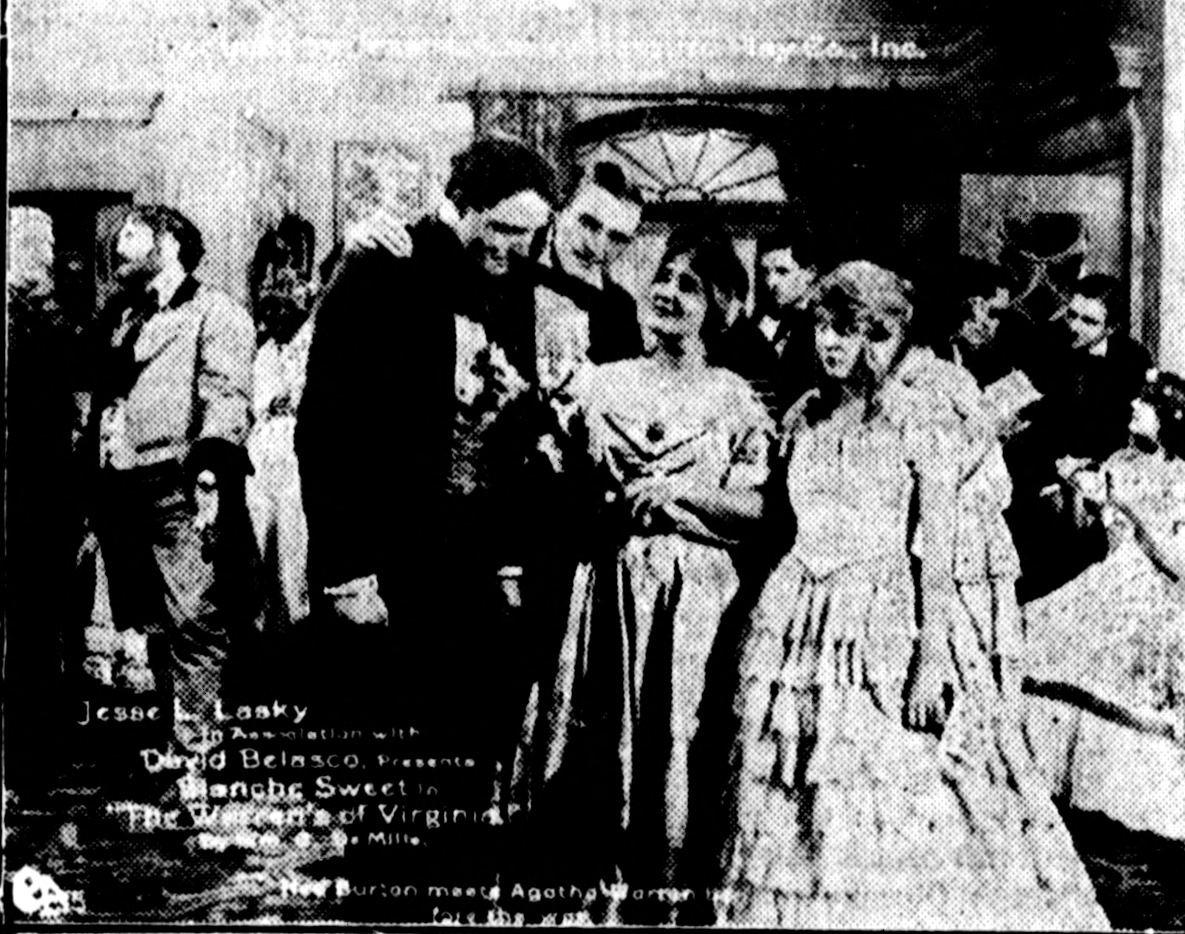
Scene from the film.

The Warrens of Virginia is a 1915 American silent drama film directed by Cecil B. DeMille. Prints of the film survive at the George Eastman House Motion Picture Collection.

== Plot ==
As the American Civil War begins, Ned Burton leaves his Southern love, Agatha Warren, and joins the Union army. He is later protected and saved from death by Agatha in spite of her loyalty to the South.

== Cast ==
- Blanche Sweet as Agatha Warren
- James Neill as General Warren
- Page Peters as Arthur Warren (as P.E. Peters)
- Mabel Van Buren as Mrs. Warren
- House Peters as Ned Burton
- Dick La Reno as General Griffin
- Mildred Harris as Betty Warren
- Milton Brown as Zeke Biggs
- Sydney Deane as General Harding
- Raymond Hatton as Blake
- DeWitt Jennings
- Richard L'Estrange as Bill Peavey (credited as Dick La Strange)
- Lucien Littlefield as Tom Dabney

== See also ==
- List of films and television shows about the American Civil War
- Blanche Sweet filmography
- The Warrens of Virginia (1924 film)
