= Reynal =

Reynal is a surname. Notable people with the surname include:

- Arnaldo Orfila Reynal (1897–1997), Argentine-Mexican publisher
- Eugene Reynal (1902–1968), American publisher
  - Reynal & Hitchcock, a New York publishing company he co-founded
- Jeanne Reynal (1903–1983), American mosaic artist
- José Reynal-Restrepo (1977–2011), murdered Colombian priest
- Victoire Cogevina Reynal, American-born Greek-Argentine businesswoman

== See also ==
- Raynel Espinal (born 1991), Dominican professional baseball pitcher
- Guillaume Thomas François Raynal (1713–96), French writer
