= Joseph L. Mankiewicz =

American filmmaker (1909–1993)

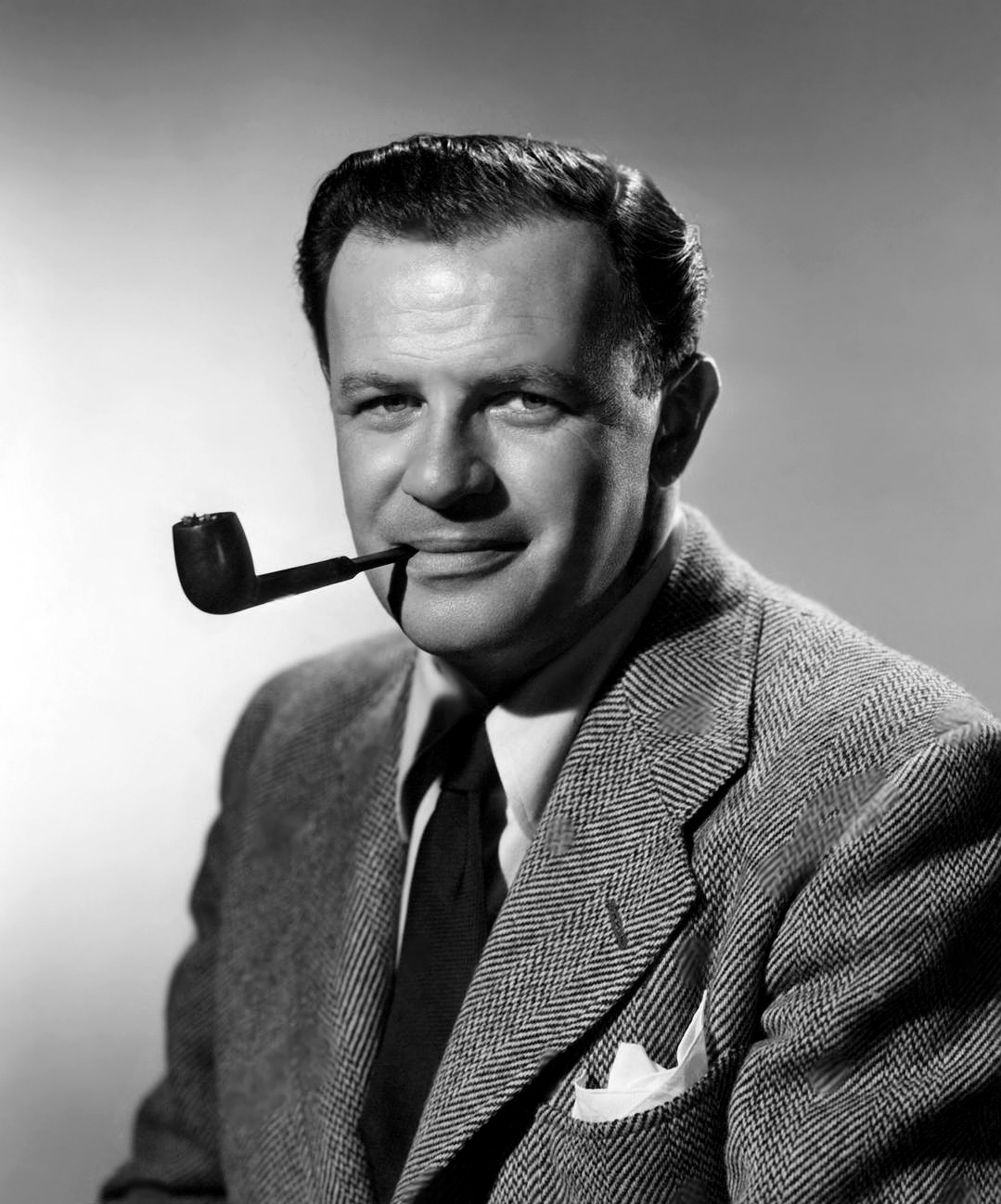
- Mankiewicz in a 1950 publicity photograph
- Born: Joseph Leo Mankiewicz; February 11, 1909; Wilkes-Barre, Pennsylvania, U.S.
- Died: February 5, 1993 (aged 83); Bedford, New York, U.S.
- Education: Columbia University (BA)
- Occupations: Film director; screenwriter; producer
- Years active: 1929–1972
- Spouses: Elizabeth Young (m. 1934; div. 1937) Rose Stradner (m. 1939; died 1958) Rosemary Matthews (m. 1962)
- Children: 4, including Tom
- Relatives: Herman J. Mankiewicz (brother)
- Family: Mankiewicz family

Joseph Leo Mankiewicz (/ˈmæŋkəwɪts/ MANG-kə-wits; February 11, 1909 – February 5, 1993) was an American filmmaker. A four-time Academy Award winner, he is best known for his witty and literate dialogue and his preference for voice-over narration and narrative flashbacks. Also known as an actor's director, Mankiewicz directed several prominent actors, including Bette Davis, Gene Tierney, Humphrey Bogart and Elizabeth Taylor, to several of their memorable onscreen performances.

Born in Wilkes-Barre, Pennsylvania, Mankiewicz studied at Columbia University and graduated in 1928. He moved to Europe, where he worked as a foreign correspondent for the Chicago Tribune and translated German intertitles into English for UFA. On the advice of his screenwriter brother Herman, Mankiewicz moved back to the United States and was hired by Paramount Pictures as a dialogue writer. He then became a screenwriter, writing for numerous films starring Jack Oakie. He next moved to Metro-Goldwyn-Mayer (MGM), where he served as a producer for several films, including The Philadelphia Story (1940) and Woman of the Year (1942). Mankiewicz left MGM after a dispute with Louis B. Mayer.

In 1944, Mankiewicz began working for Twentieth Century-Fox, where he produced The Keys of the Kingdom (1944). He made his directorial debut with Dragonwyck (1946) after Ernst Lubitsch had dropped out due to illness. Mankiewicz remained at Twentieth Century-Fox, directing a broad range of genre films. Consecutively, in 1950 and 1951, he won two Academy Awards each for writing and directing A Letter to Three Wives (1949) and All About Eve (1950). In 1953, Mankiewicz formed his own production company, Figaro, where he independently produced, wrote, and directed The Barefoot Contessa (1954) and The Quiet American (1958).

In 1961, Mankiewicz took over as director from Rouben Mamoulian for Cleopatra (1963). The production was beset with numerous difficulties, including a heavily publicized extramarital affair between the film's stars Elizabeth Taylor and Richard Burton. Relatively late into the production, Darryl F. Zanuck reassumed control of Twentieth Century-Fox as studio president and briefly fired Mankiewicz for the film's excessive production overruns. Released in 1963, Cleopatra became the year's highest-grossing film and earned mixed reviews from film critics. Mankiewicz's reputation suffered, and he did not return to direct another film until The Honey Pot (1967).

Mankiewicz then directed There Was a Crooked Man... (1970) and the documentary King: A Filmed Record... Montgomery to Memphis (1972), sharing credit with Sidney Lumet on the latter film. His final film Sleuth (1972), starring Michael Caine and Laurence Olivier, earned Mankiewicz his fourth and final Oscar nomination as Best Director. In 1993, Mankiewicz died in Bedford, New York, at the age of 83.

== Early life and education ==
Mankiewicz was born in Wilkes-Barre, Pennsylvania, to Franz Mankiewicz (died 1941) and Johanna Blumenau, Ashkenazi Jewish emigrants from Germany and Courland, respectively. His siblings were Herman J. Mankiewicz (1897–1953) and Erna Stenbuck (née Mankiewicz, 1901–1979). At age four, Joseph moved with his family to New York City, and graduated in 1924 from Stuyvesant High School. He followed his brother Herman to Columbia University, where he initially wanted to be a psychiatrist. Mankiewicz once stated, "I took a pre-med course at Columbia. Then came the part where you disembowel frogs and earthworms, which horrified and nauseated me. But what really finished me was physics." Mankiewicz failed the course, and switched his major to English and wrote for the Columbia Daily Spectator. He graduated in 1928 and moved to Germany. There, he intended to enroll at the University of Berlin and finish his studies at Oxford for a potential career in pedagogy.

However, Mankiewicz abandoned these plans and was hired as an assistant correspondent for the Chicago Tribune. Sigrid Schultz, the Berlin bureau chief for the Tribune, gave Mankiewicz his first assignment to interview explorer Umberto Nobile. Mankiewicz earned another job, translating film intertitles from German to English for UFA, and worked a third job as a stringer for the Variety trade magazine. He relocated to Paris, which Mankiewicz described as the "three most miserable months of my life." After receiving a despondent letter from his brother, Herman encouraged Joseph to move to Hollywood.

== Career ==
=== 1929–1933: Paramount ===
In 1929, Joseph was hired by Paramount Pictures, becoming the studio's youngest staff writer at the age of 20. Within eight weeks, Joseph wrote titles for 1929's The Dummy (with his brother Herman), The Man I Love, and Thunderbolt. David O. Selznick, then an assistant to Paramount general manager B. P. Schulberg, proposed that Joseph write the dialogue to Fast Company (1929), an adaptation of the 1928 play Elmer The Great by George M. Cohan and Ring Lardner. Mankiewicz's name later appeared in the Los Angeles Record's 1929 list of the ten best dialogue writers. The recognition earned Mankiewicz the assignment of writing several films, which starred Jack Oakie.

At age 22, Joseph was nominated for an Academy Award for Best Adapted Screenplay for Skippy (1931), which starred Jackie Cooper. Based on the nomination, Herman petitioned Schulberg to give Joseph a pay raise. Schulberg declined, and Herman threatened to resign. Eventually, Schulberg relented and signed Joseph to a seven-year contract, which earned him a weekly salary of "somewhere between $75 to $100". He co-wrote the screenplay of Sooky (1931), a sequel to Skippy. Meanwhile, Joseph dated actress Frances Dee, who co-starred in June Moon (1931) and This Reckless Age (1932), which he had co-scripted.

Joseph wrote four films with Paramount Pictures in 1932, which included segments for If I Had a Million (1932). The segments included "Rollo and the Roadhogs" which featured W. C. Fields and Alison Skipworth as two retired vaudevillians, and "The Three Marines" with Jack Oakie and Gary Cooper. He also contributed to other segments, including "The China Stop" with Charlie Ruggles as a bookkeeper in a china stop and "The Forger" with George Raft as a runaway criminal who is unable to cash his check. After six months of courtship, Joseph became engaged to Frances Dee but one week before their marriage, Dee eloped with Joel McCrea, whom she co-starred with on The Silver Cord (1933). Feeling devastated, Joseph ran a fever and was hospitalized for a "partial nervous breakdown."

Joseph wrote an original story treatment titled In the Red, which satirized the League of Nations. Paramount studio executives accused him of plagiarizing the next Marx Brothers film Duck Soup (1933), in which Herman was the film's producer. Joseph contested the charge and resigned from Paramount in December 1932. He then moved to RKO Pictures, where Sam Jaffe hired Joe and Henry Myers to complete the script, which was retitled Diplomaniacs (1933). Jaffe later hired Joseph to script Emergency Call (1933). He returned to Paramount for Too Much Harmony (1933) with Jack Oakie and Bing Crosby. Selznick selected Joseph to do uncredited rewrites for MGM's Meet the Baron (1933), which Herman had written the screenplay for.

Joseph's last Paramount film was Alice in Wonderland (1933), in which he co-authored the screenplay with William Cameron Menzies. An adaptation of Lewis Carroll's 1865 novel and Alice Through the Looking-Glass (1871) combined into a singular film, Alice in Wonderland featured an ensemble cast of Paramount's contract stars, including Gary Cooper as The White Knight, Cary Grant as the Mock Turtle, W. C. Fields as Humpty Dumpty, and Edward Everett Horton as the Mad Hatter. Years later, Joseph reflected: "The result was a disaster, but a well-intentioned disaster. The costumes and the headpieces were so heavy that the actors couldn't carry them, so they had doubles walking through all the master or long shots."

=== 1934–1942: MGM ===
Herman began working for Metro-Goldwyn-Mayer (MGM) in March 1933, and David O. Selznick hired Joseph as a screenwriter with a weekly salary of $750. At the age of 25, Joseph co-wrote Manhattan Melodrama (1934) with Oliver H. P. Garrett, which starred Myrna Loy and William Powell. The film was a critical and commercial success, and two months into its release, federal agents shot John Dillinger who left a Chicago theater. At the 1935 Academy Awards, Arthur Caesar won the Academy Award for Best Story. Meanwhile, Joseph contributed additional dialogue for King Vidor's 1934 film Our Daily Bread.

Mankiewicz's next project was adapting Forsaking All Others (1934) based on the 1933 play by Edward Barry Roberts and Frank Morgan Cavett. Bernard H. Hyman was the producer, and Joe was instructed to write for Loretta Young, George Brent, and Joel McCrea. When Mankiewicz delivered the script, Hyman replied: "We're going to use Joan Crawford, Clark Gable and Robert Montgomery." He told Mankiewicz to arrive at Crawford's residence and read the script to her. Mankiewicz at first declined the offer, but later drove to Crawford's Brentwood home. During the reading, Crawford was delighted at the line: "I could build a fire by rubbing two Boy Scouts together." Forsaking All Others became a success and Mankiewicz was assigned another Joan Crawford vehicle I Live My Life (1935), after Louis B. Mayer told Mankiewicz: "You're the only one on the lot who knows what to do with her."

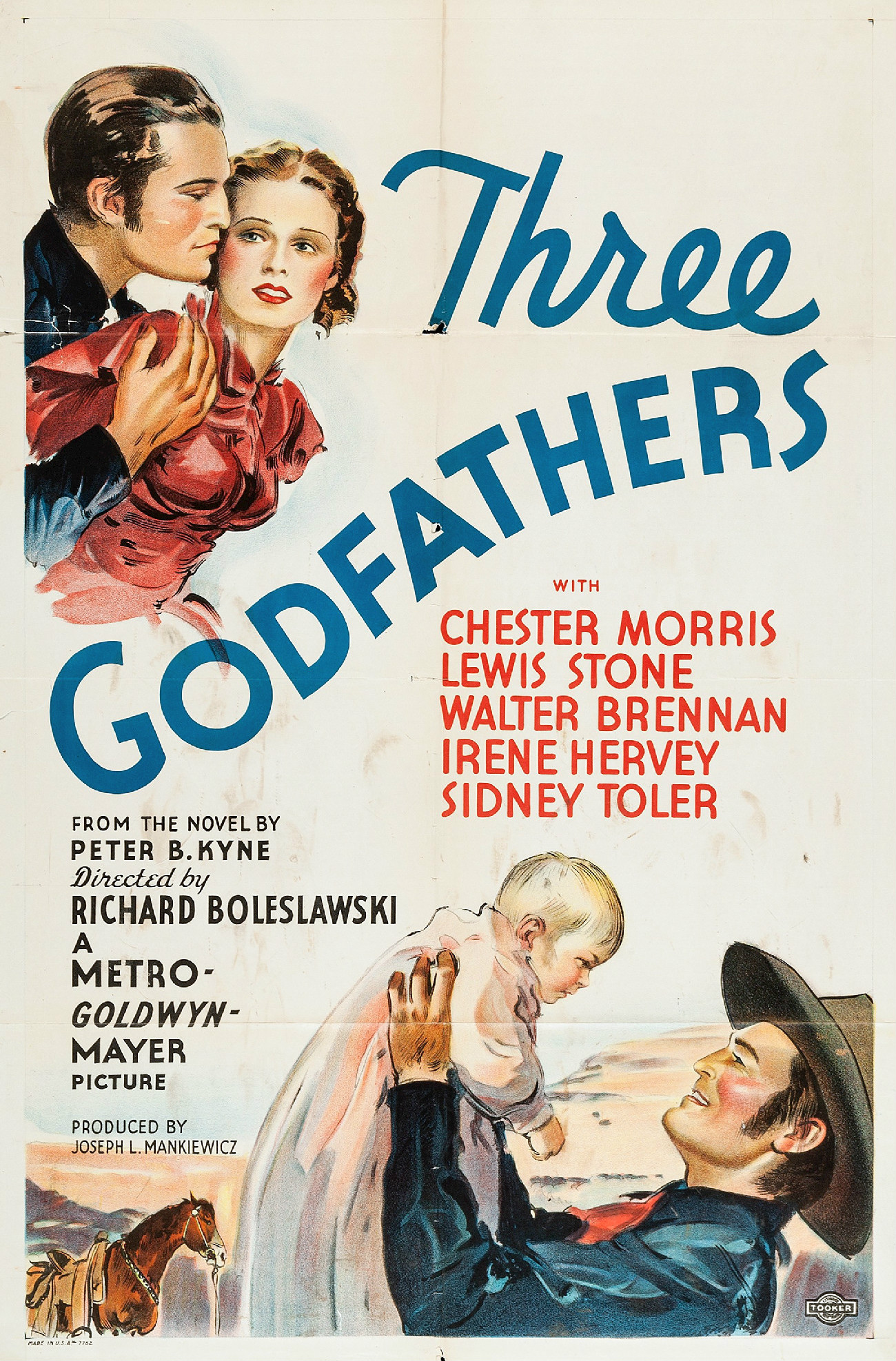
The 1936 film poster for Three Godfathers. Mankiewicz is listed as the producer near the bottom.

In the autumn of 1935, having written three successful films, Mankiewicz personally requested Mayer to direct his own feature film. Mayer declined his proposition and instead replied: "You have to learn to crawl before you can walk." Mankiewicz was instead promoted as a film producer, beginning with Three Godfathers (1936). Adapted from the 1913 short story by Peter B. Kyne, the film is a biblically inspired Western about three outlaws—Chester Morris, Lewis Stone and Walter Brennan—rescuing a baby in the Mojave Desert.

Mankiewicz's next project was Fury (1936), which was inspired by a real-life mob lynching in which two suspects, held in a San Jose prison, were hanged for the murder of a department store heir. While in New York, screenwriter Norman Krasna read the story in The Nation. During the summer of 1934, he pitched an adaptation to Mankiewicz and Samuel Marx, who were interested in it. After some time, Krasna had no recollection of the story, so Mankiewicz wrote a ten-page treatment titled Mob Rule and paid Krasner for the screen rights.

MGM general manager Eddie Mannix handed Fritz Lang the Mob Rule treatment, with the subsequent drafts written by Bartlett Cormack. During filming, Lang had an adversarial relationship with the cast and crew. Mankiewicz reflected years later by calling Lang a "a strange man" and a "terrible tyrant on the set." Released in June 1936, Fury was acclaimed by several film critics and was a box office success, catapulting Mankiewicz with his first major hit as a producer.

Mankewicz reteamed with Crawford on the 1936 film The Gorgeous Hussy—her first costume drama film—as an innkeeper's daughter, with Robert Taylor, Franchot Tone, Melvyn Douglas and James Stewart as potential tutors. Their collaboration continued with Love on the Run (1936), a romantic comedy with two newspaper men, Clark Gable and Franchot Tone vying for Crawford. Retroactively seen as a pale imitation of It Happened One Night (1934, which also starred Gable), it was a box office success. Crawford next starred in The Bride Wore Red (1937), directed by Dorothy Arzner.

Beginning with Mannequin (1937), Mankiewicz collaborated with director Frank Borzage in a story about a Delancey Street working-class girl torn between her chiseler husband (Alan Curtis) and a shipping magnate (Spencer Tracy). Their follow-up film, Three Comrades (1938), with Margaret Sullavan and Robert Taylor, began F. Scott Fitzgerald writing the initial script. However, Sullavan complained to Mankiewicz that her dialogue was unspeakable, which caused Mankiewicz and other screenwriters to rewrite Fitzgerald's dialogue. Mankiewicz later joked, "If I go down at all in literary history, in a footnote, it will be as the swine who rewrote F. Scott Fitzgerald." Borzage's next film The Shining Hour (1938), starring Crawford, Sullavan and Melvyn Douglas, was well received by critics but was a box-office flop.

Mankiewicz produced A Christmas Carol (1938). At least four film versions had already existed before Lionel Barrymore, who had played Ebenezer Scrooge on the radio, prompted MGM to have his filmed version. However, Barrymore broke his hip after he tripped over a cable while filming Saratoga (1937). Mankiewicz offered to delay filming for a year, but Barrymore insisted the production continue. Mankiewicz selected Reginald Owen as Scrooge, who had been hired to portray Jacob Marley. Production was completed in November 1938 and the film was screened as the Christmas attraction at the Radio City Music Hall. Variety wrote the film wielded "superb acting, inspired direction and top production values into an intensively interesting exposition of the Dickens story." Since its release, A Christmas Carol has become a perennial television favorite.

By 1938, Katharine Hepburn had been labeled "box office poison" by box office exhibitors after several unsuccessful films. Hepburn departed Hollywood and starred as Tracy Lord in Philip Barry's 1939 play The Philadelphia Story. It became one of the year's successful Broadway plays, and Howard Hughes secured the film rights enabling Hepburn to forge a screen comeback. Several Hollywood studios declined to produce the film because of Hepburn's box office record. Major male actors demurred at being potentially outshone by her. Louis B. Mayer took Hughes's offer on the assurance that Hepburn would appear with "two important male stars."

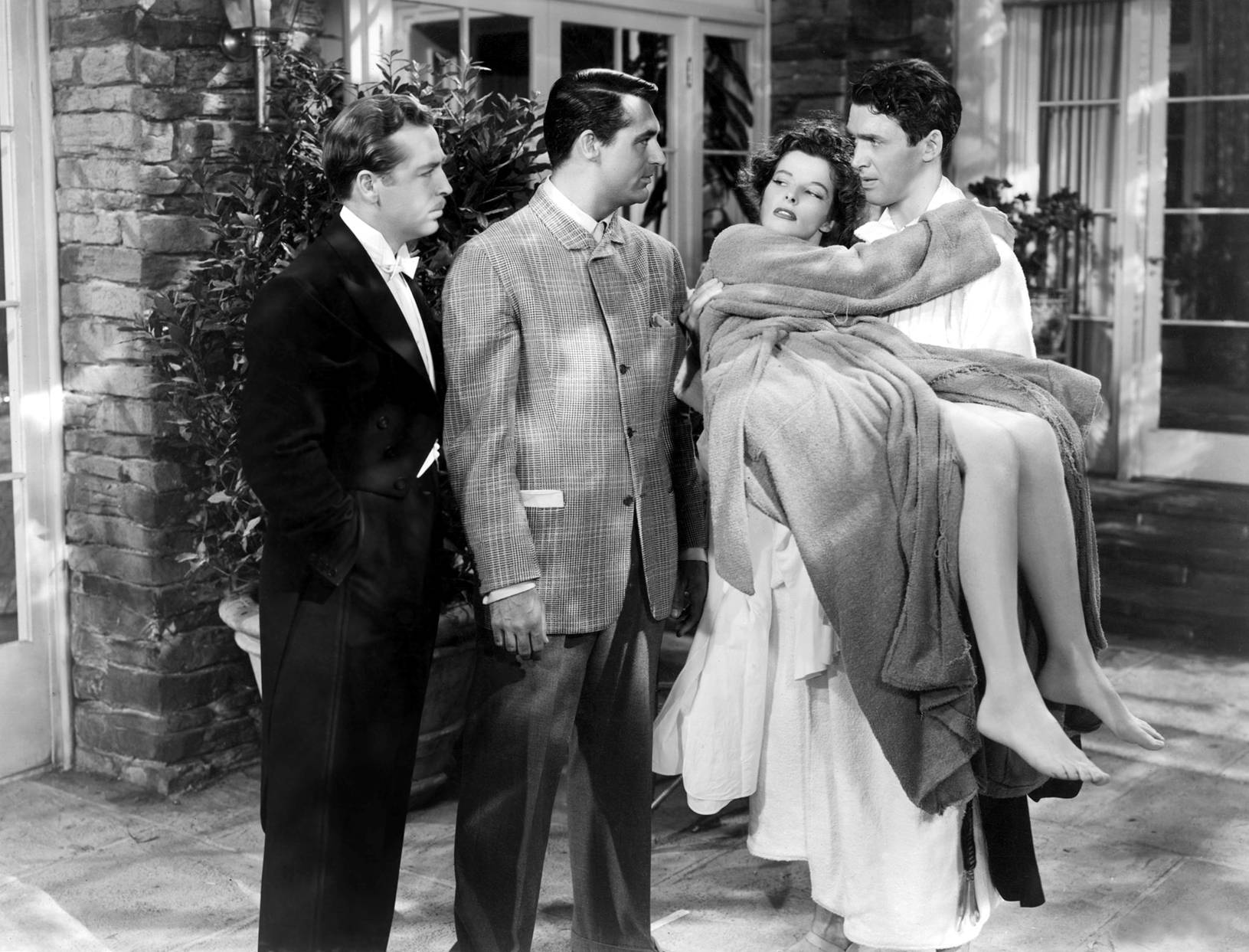
L-R: John Howard, Cary Grant, Katharine Hepburn and James Stewart in The Philadelphia Story.

Cary Grant and James Stewart were cast in the leading male roles, while George Cukor was hired to direct. At Hepburn's insistence, Donald Ogden Stewart wrote a faithful adaptation of Barry's play, though he added two brief scenes based on Mankiewicz's suggestions. Mankiewicz claimed credit for the film's opening scene—a silent comic prologue featuring Grant and Hepburn in a tableau of their temperamental and fracturing marriage. Released in December 1940, The Philadelphia Story was a critical and commercial success, making it Mankiewicz's biggest hit as a producer. At the 1941 Academy Awards, the film earned six Oscar nominations, including one for Outstanding Production for Mankiewicz. James Stewart won the Academy Award for Best Actor, as well as Odgen Stewart winning for Best Adapted Screenplay.

Mankiewicz reteamed with Hepburn on the romantic comedy Woman of the Year (1942). Deriving inspiration from his father and newspaper columnist Dorothy Parker, Ring Lardner Jr. had written a story outline before collaborating with Garson and Michael Kanin. Both men drafted a 99-page script, tentatively titled The Thing About Women, which they showed to Hepburn. Eager to make it her next film, Hepburn presented the script directly to Mayer, who then consulted Mankiewicz for his opinion. He was enthusiastic for the script, believing it had been written by Ben Hecht and Charles MacArthur.

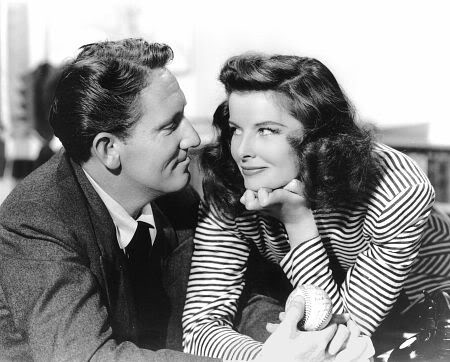
Mankiewicz produced Woman of the Year, which paired Katharine Hepburn and Spencer Tracy for the first time.

Retitled Woman of the Year, the premise involves Tess Harding, a high-browed foreign affairs reporter, pitted against Sam Craig, a sports columnist. Spencer Tracy was Hepburn's first choice, though he was initially unavailable until The Yearling (1946) was cancelled. Mankiewicz introduced the two stars, who had never met before. Hepburn greeted Tracy, commenting, "I fear I may be too tall for you, Mr. Tracy." "Don't worry," Mankiewicz chimed in, "He'll cut you down to size." George Cukor was also unavailable as he was directing Two-Faced Woman (1941) so at Hepburn's behest, George Stevens was loaned out to MGM from Columbia Pictures.

During test screenings, preview audiences disdained the original ending, which had Tess accepting her newfound role as a housewife. Stevens, Mankiewicz, and Mayer agreed that a new ending was needed, with Tess attempting to make breakfast but failing miserably. Hepburn deplored the new scene, but test audiences responded favorably. Released in February 1942, Woman of the Year was praised by film critics for the chemistry between the stars. At the 1943 Academy Awards, Hepburn was nominated for Best Actress, while Michael Kanin and Lardner Jr. won for Best Original Screenplay.

By 1942, Mankiewicz was romantically involved with Judy Garland. As a vehicle for Garland, he began adapting S. N. Behrman's 1942 play The Pirate. The adaptation was never completed, but eventually became a 1948 musical unrelated to Mankiewicz's involvement. To reduce Garland's dependency on prescription medicine, Mankiewicz advised her to seek psychiatric therapy sessions with Ernst Simmel. Garland's mother Ethel Gumm reported the incident to Mayer, who later called Mankiewicz into his office. There, Mayer admonished him about the affair, claiming that he wasn't speaking "as a boss," but "as a friend." Mankiewicz retorted: "Actually, you've been neither, Mr. Mayer. You're talking like a jealous old man." The two argued, and Mankiewicz decided to quit MGM and negotiated for an early termination with one year left on his contract.

Mankiewicz's final productions at MGM were Reunion in France (1942) starring Joan Crawford and John Wayne, and Cairo (1942) with Jeanette MacDonald—the latter film Mankiewicz had his producing credit removed at his request.

=== 1943–1952: 20th Century Fox ===
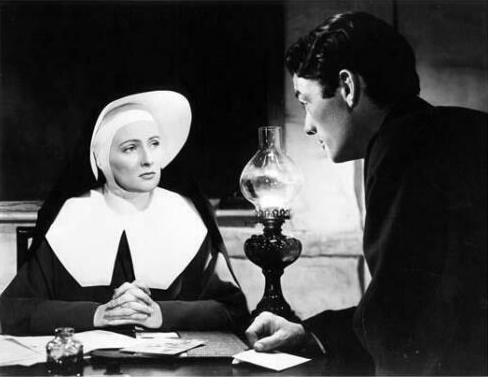
Rose Stradner and Gregory Peck in The Keys of the Kingdom

By August 1943, Mankiewicz had signed with Twentieth Century-Fox, stipulating his contractual right to write and direct. As a follow-up to The Song of Bernadette (1943), Mankiewicz selected A. J. Cronin's 1941 novel The Keys of the Kingdom as his first production. Rewriting a script by Nunnally Johnson, the tale centered on Father Francis Chisholm, a humble Scottish Catholic priest, in his thirty-five years as a missionary in a small Chinese village. Gregory Peck was cast in the lead role while Ingrid Bergman was the studio's first choice as the Reverend Mother Maria-Veronica. When Bergman became available, Mankiewicz pleaded with Darryl F. Zanuck to instead cast his then-wife Rose Stradner. The film opened in December 1944 to mixed reviews, though it garnered four Academy Award nominations, including Best Actor for Gregory Peck.

Meanwhile, Twentieth Century-Fox acquired the screen rights to Anya Seton's gothic romance novel Dragonwyck, with Ernst Lubitsch as the director. However, Lubitsch collapsed from a heart attack while filming A Royal Scandal (1945). While recuperating, he decided instead to produce and have Mankiewicz direct Dragonwyck (1946). By May 1944, Gregory Peck and Gene Tierney were cast in the leading roles, but Peck dropped out to star in Duel in the Sun (1946) and was replaced by Vincent Price.

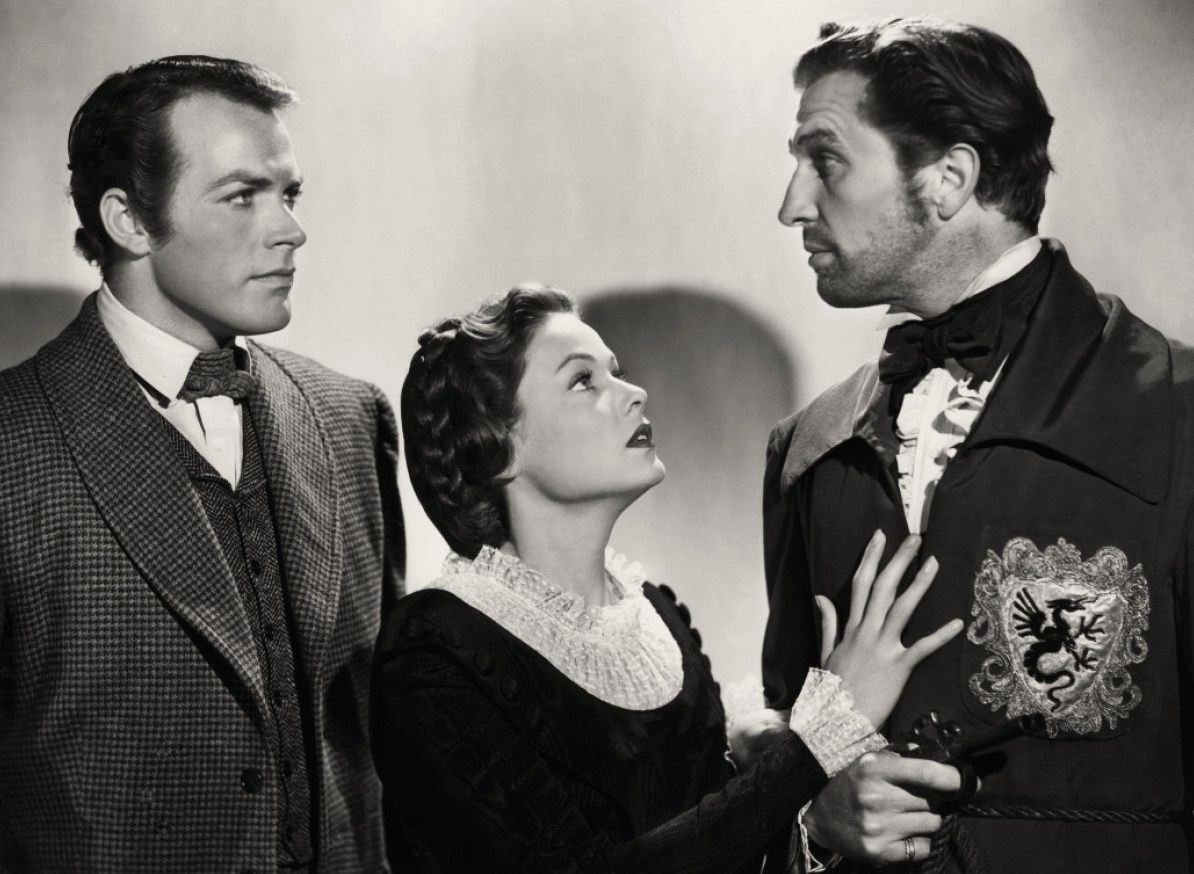
L–R: Glenn Langan, Gene Tierney, and Vincent Price in Dragonwyck

Dragonwyck tells of Nicholas van Ryn, the proprietor of the Dragonwyck estate, who poisons his invalid wife and marries his cousin Miranda, in hopes of bearing an heir. When their infant son dies, Nicholas copes with opium and schemes to murder Miranda, who falls for a local doctor. Displeased with Mankiewicz's creative decisions, Lubitsch removed his name from the production credits. "We differed about some of the direction," Mankiewicz explained, "mostly about where I put the camera." Variety applauded Dragonwyck as a "psychological yarn, its mid-19th century American feudal background being always brooding with never a break in its flow of morbidity. Yet, it is always interesting if somewhat too pointed at times in its fictional contrivance." The film earned $3 million at the box office in the United States and Canada.

Somewhere in the Night (1946) was adapted from Marvin Borowsky's short story "The Lonely Journey". While Zanuck was in Europe, film producer Anderson Lawler came across the story, which impressed Zanuck. Back in the United States, Lawler handed Mankiewicz an adaptation script by Howard Dimsdale. A film noir, John Hodiak plays an amnesiac war veteran who searches for a detective named Larry Cravat, whom he discovers was involved in a murder over two million in Nazi funds funneled into Los Angeles.

Over a course of eighteen months, Mankiewicz directed three adaptations by Philip Dunne—The Late George Apley (1947), The Ghost and Mrs. Muir (1948), and Escape (1948)—each film "done in rapid succession, not of my writing, in which I concentrated upon learning the technique and craft—indeed, upon dissociating myself as far as possible from the writer's approach." Adapted from John P. Marquand's novel of the same name, The Late George Apley was first produced as a play by Marquand and George S. Kaufman. Fox purchased the film rights for $275,000, with Ronald Colman and Peggy Cummins as the title character and Eleanor Apley, George's daughter.

Adapted from R. A. Dick's 1945 novel, The Ghost and Mrs. Muir stars Rex Harrison as the ghost of a sea captain unsuccessfully seeking to frighten Lucy Muir (Gene Tierney), a young widow who has rented her house at the turn of the century. During filming, Tierney's first two days were reshot at Dunne and Zanuck's request, as Dunne had envisioned her as a "straightforward, practical woman" compared to Tierney's quirkier characterization. More reshoots were done when Richard Ney was replaced with George Sanders. Upon its release, film reviewers praised Harrison and Tierney's performances. The Ghost and Mrs. Muir was nominated for the Academy Award for Best Cinematography (Black and White). Mankiewicz reteamed with Harrison in Escape (1948), a story about a convict who escapes a Dartmoor prison. Filmed in Britain under tax regulations, much of the film was shot on location.

Producer Sol C. Siegel had acquired the screen rights to the 1946 novel A Letter to Five Wives, which first appeared as a short story in Cosmopolitan magazine. Siegel had intended for Ernest Lubitsch to direct, and hired Vera Caspary to write a script adaptation. Mankiewicz remembered, "I read [Caspary's script] and knew I had looked upon the Promised Land. I wrote the screenplay about four wives; Zanuck, in an almost bloodless operation, excised one, so we ended with A Letter to Three Wives." Set in an affluent, postwar American suburb, three wives—Jeanne Crain, Linda Darnell, and Ann Sothern—reflect on their marriages as each considers which of their husbands has eloped with Addie Ross, voiced by Celeste Holm. The film premiered at the Radio City Music Hall and was lauded by critics and audiences for the performances of the cast. At the 22nd Academy Awards, in 1950, Mankiewicz was bestowed two Academy Awards for Best Director and Best Adapted Screenplay.

In May 1949, Mankiewicz was the first recipient of the Screen Directors Guild (SDG)'s Award for Outstanding Directorial Achievement. A year later, he was elected as the president for the Screen Directors Guild. Cecil B. DeMille, a proponent for the Hollywood blacklist, proposed that guild members should take an anticommunist loyalty oath. In August 1950, the board approved the measure, while Mankiewicz was vacationing overseas after filming All About Eve. When Mankiewicz returned, he was shocked DeMille had gone behind his back. "It seems to me that kind of thing only happens in Moscow," to which DeMille replied, "Well, maybe we need a little of that here." On October 12, DeMille convened a general board meeting where he requested 25 signatures to recall Mankiewicz as the guild president. Mankiewicz's supporters included John Huston, William Wyler, and Billy Wilder. Throughout the night, at the Beverly Hills Hotel, Mankiewicz survived the recall election but retained the loyalty oath.

Meanwhile, Siegel had hired screenwriter Philip Yordan to adapt Jerome Weidman's novel, I'll Never Go There Anymore into a feature film titled House of Strangers (1949). However, Yordan was fired after writing two-thirds of a first draft. Between assignments, Mankiewicz did an entire rewrite of the script, in which the Screen Writers Guild arbitrated a shared credit between him and Yordan. Mankiewicz angrily disagreed, so Yordan was given the sole credit. Featuring Edward G. Robinson, Richard Conte and Susan Hayward, the story centers on Gino Monetti, an Italian-American ex-convict son of a banking family who seeks revenge against his brothers for turning him in to the police. The film was entered into the 1949 Cannes Film Festival where Robinson won the Best Actor Award.

Following a trend of socially conscious films, including Gentleman's Agreement (1947) and The Snake Pit (1948), Zanuck purchased a story by Lesser Samuels about a racially charged encounter between a Black doctor and a white racist criminal. Yordan had written a script, which Mankiewicz promptly rewrote in six weeks. Titled No Way Out (1950), Mankiewicz cast Sidney Poitier in his screen debut while Richard Widmark played one of the racist brothers who accuses Poitier's character of medical malpractice.

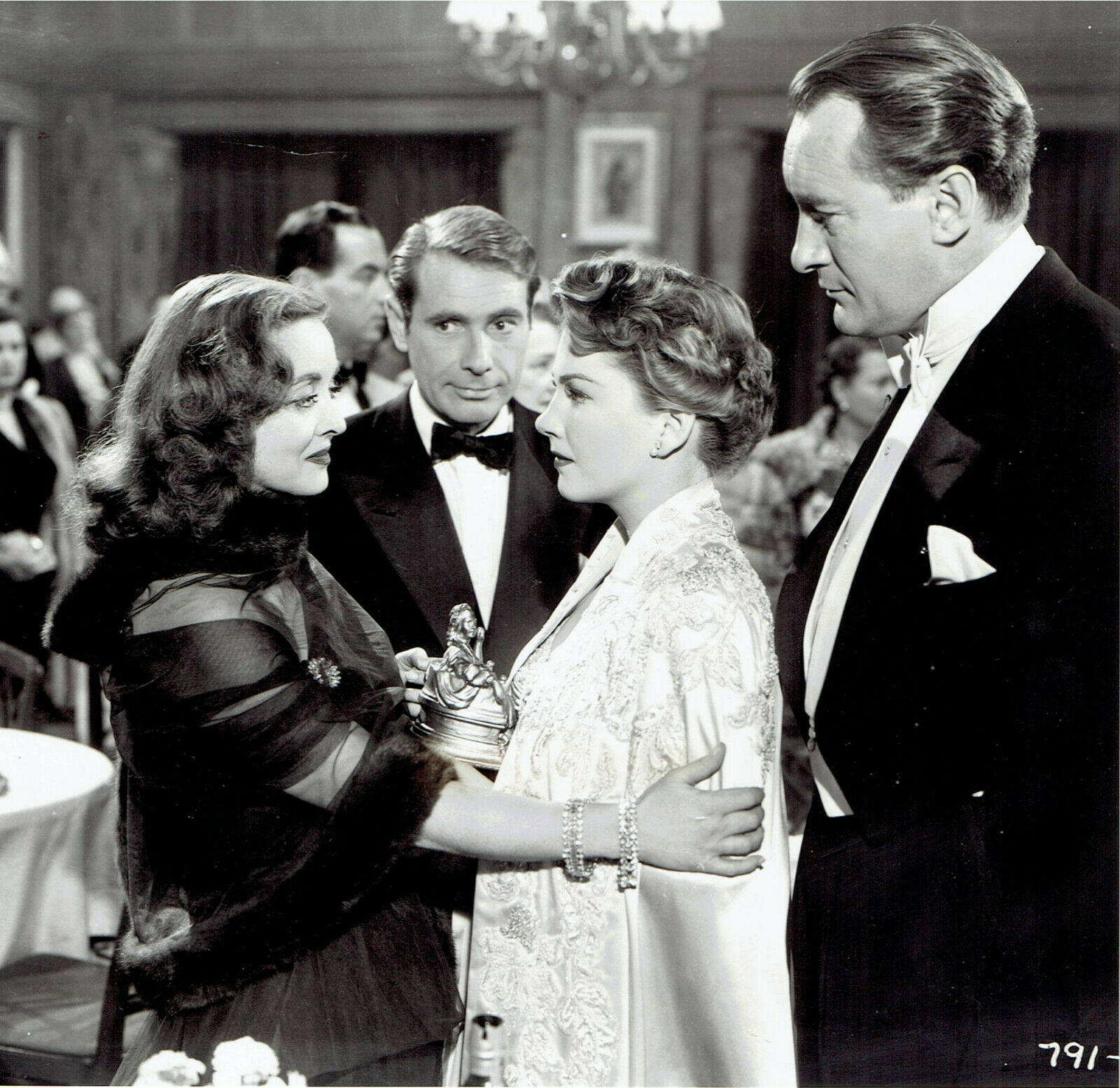
L-R: Bette Davis, Gary Merrill, Anne Baxter and George Sanders in All About Eve.

All About Eve was based on the short story "The Wisdom of Eve" written by Mary Orr and published in Cosmopolitan magazine in May 1946. Twentieth Century-Fox optioned the film rights to Orr's story for $5,000 in 1949. Mankiewicz began writing the first draft while preparing for No Way Out. Notably, he secluded himself for six weeks to laboriously write the draft at the San Ysidro Ranch near Santa Barbara. On March 7, 1950, Zanuck finished reading Mankiewicz's script and immediately sent a memo: "Without any question of a doubt you have done a remarkable job. The holes that were present in certain sections of the original treatment have disappeared." However, he delivered a lengthier memo, requesting a reduction of fifty pages.

Claudette Colbert was initially cast as Margo Channing, but suffered a back injury and withdrew less than ten days before filming. To replace her, Mankiewicz considered Gertrude Lawrence. Her attorney Fanny Holtzmann demanded changes to the script, which Mankiewicz declined to make. Fresh from her mutual split from Warner Bros., Bette Davis read the script, describing it as the best she had ever read, and accepted the role. Jeanne Crain was originally considered for the part of Eve Harrington, but Mankiewicz felt she lacked the "bitch virtuosity" needed for the role. With Zanuck's approval, Anne Baxter was instead cast. Filming for All About Eve began in April 1950 at the Curran Theatre in San Francisco, which doubled as the interior and exterior locations of a Broadway theater.

Critical reaction for All About Eve was universally positive, with praise directed towards the cast and Mankiewicz's direction and screenplay. At the 23rd Academy Awards, All About Eve was nominated for a record fourteen Academy Awards and won Best Picture. Mankiewicz and Lester Samuels were also nominated for Best Story and Screenplay for No Way Out but lost to Sunset Boulevard. Mankiewicz won his second consecutive set of Academy Awards for Best Director and Best Adapted Screenplay. Bette Davis and Anne Baxter were both nominated for Best Actress, but lost to Judy Holliday in Born Yesterday (1950). George Sanders won for Best Supporting Actor.

Mankiewicz adapted and directed People Will Talk (1951), also produced by Zanuck, which starred Cary Grant and Jeanne Crain. Adapted from Curt Goetz's 1932 play Dr. Prätorius, Grant plays a physician who is investigated for his unorthodox medical practices led by Professor Ewell (Hume Cronyn). Meanwhile, he falls for Deborah Higgins, an unwed pregnant student contemplating suicide. Though it received favorable reviews, the film was not profitable.

Mankiewicz's last film under contract with Fox was 5 Fingers (1952), starring James Mason and Danielle Darrieux. Zanuck had enlisted Henry Hathaway to direct and Michael Wilson to write a script from Ludwig Carl Moyzisch's nonfiction book Operation Cicero. Mankiewicz read Wilson's script and cabled to Zanuck, stating he wanted to rewrite the dialogue, feeling it needed "humor, sex and excitement." Zanuck consented, provided that Mankiewicz would not seek a writing credit and accept Otto Lang as the film's producer. At Zanuck's insistence, the film was retitled 5 Fingers to avoid association with a race riot that had occurred in Cicero, Illinois. On the last day of filming, in September 1951, Mankiewicz declined to renew his contract with Twentieth Century-Fox and decided to become an independent filmmaker. Released in March 1952, 5 Fingers garnered fairly positive reviews.

=== 1953–1960: Return to MGM; Figaro, Inc. ===
In December 1951, Mankiewicz signed a three-picture contract with MGM's Dore Schary, with a stipulation he be allowed to produce theatrical stage productions. By 1952, Mankiewicz had three projects he was contemplating—an adaptation of Carl Jonas' novel Jefferson Selleck about a Midwestern businessman experiencing a midlife crisis with Spencer Tracy; The Barefoot Contessa, and a new stage production of La bohème at the Metropolitan Opera in New York City. During this time, MGM producer John Houseman approached Mankiewicz about directing a film adaptation of Julius Caesar. He reflected, "Joe was one of the first people I thought of. He is so literate and such a good dialogue writer, I knew he'd be interested."

Casting for the central roles involved several American and British actors, including James Mason as Brutus, John Gielgud as Cassius, and Louis Calhern as Caesar. Marlon Brando's casting as Marc Antony was met with skepticism, so much that Time magazine jokingly wondered if Brando would be "muttering and grumbling his lines in a Polish accent, sound reading the funeral oration?" Against the studio's objections, Houseman chose to photograph in black and white so it would mirror newsreels of Benito Mussolini. Principal photography continued until late October 1952, with the production sets repurposed from Quo Vadis (1951).

Released during the summer of 1953, Julius Caesar received positive reviews from film critics. Bosley Crowther of The New York Times wrote the film was "a production that pulls the full potential of point and passion from this classic of the stage", and Brando's reciting of Mark Antony's speech was described as a "brilliant, electrifying splurge of bitter and passionate invective". While directing rehearsals for La bohème, disagreements over Jefferson Selleck led to a lapse in Mankiewicz's MGM contract.

In 1951, Mankiewicz relocated his family to New York. Within two years, he established his independent production company Figaro, Inc. Its namesake was taken from the barber in Mozart's opera The Marriage of Figaro. In Mankiewicz's words, Figaro did "a little bit of everything." In June 1956, NBC acquired a 50 percent stake with the right of first refusal to any proposed film project. United Artists was inked as the distributor, and Mankiewicz proceeded with his two-picture deal with The Barefoot Contessa, which he had been originally written to be a novel.

For his first original screenplay, Mankiewicz is believed to have been inspired by several Hollywood actresses, including Rita Hayworth, Linda Darnell, and Anne Chevalier. Envisioned as a Cinderella-like story set in Hollywood, the tale centers on the starlet Maria Vargas as her career is told in flashbacks, with one told by Harry Dawes, a veteran film director, played by Humphrey Bogart. Ava Gardner was Mankiewicz's first choice for the title role, and she was loaned from MGM for a payment of $200,000 plus ten percent of the box office returns.

Principal filming began in early January 1954 at the Cinecittà studio in Rome. Bogart was frustrated with Gardner whispering her lines during one take and criticized her acting skills. Bogart himself had severe racking coughs while delivering his lines. When filming concluded, Mankiewicz regretted that he had not built any rapport with Gardner. Upon its release, Gene Arneel of Variety praised the film as a "dish of ingeniously-fashioned, original entertainment for grown-up viewers. it has a strong show business flavor and a line or two that might be beyond the ken of strangers in movie-making. But its basic story elements are strong and make for substantial fare on anyone's menu." At the 27th Academy Awards, Mankiewicz was nominated for Best Story and Screenplay while Edmond O'Brien won for Best Supporting Actor. Meanwhile, the script was sued twice for plagiarism; one was quickly dismissed and the other, litigated in 1960, alleged similarities to an unpublished manuscript inspired by Chevalier's life. It was also dismissed.

In 1954, Samuel Goldwyn hired Mankiewicz to write and direct the film version of the Broadway musical Guys and Dolls. Goldwyn wanted Gene Kelly for the part of Sky Masterson, but MGM's Nicholas Schenck vigorously declined to loan out Kelly. Goldwyn suggested Marlon Brando instead, and Mankiewicz convinced Brando to take the part to expand his acting oeuvre. Frank Sinatra pursued the role as Nathan Detroit, while Jean Simmons was cast as Sister Sarah Brown after an extensive search. Guys and Dolls was one of 1955's biggest box office hits, earning $9 million in estimated distributor rentals in the United States and Canada. However, film critics found the film too verbose and were mixed on the musical performances.

By the time Guys and Dolls was released, Mankiewicz's Figaro expanded with its contract with United Artists to produce nine films, with five films to be written and directed by him within four years. For his second directorial effort with Figaro, Mankiewicz considered a biographical film of Francisco Goya and an adaptation of Shakespeare's Twelfth Night with Audrey Hepburn and Danny Kaye. He however decided to write and direct The Quiet American (1958), an adaptation of Graham Greene's 1955 novel. Set against the backdrop of Indochina (now known as Vietnam), Alden Pyle, an idealistic American, vies for the affection of Phuong, a local Vietnamese woman, against Thomas Fowler, a British journalist.

The choice role of Thomas Fowler had been offered to Laurence Olivier, who later declined after reading a draft. William Holden and James Mason were unavailable thus Mankiewicz turned to Michael Redgrave. Montgomery Clift was considered for Alden Pyle, but he was severely injured while filming Raintree County (1957). Mankiewicz then cast Audie Murphy and selected Italian actress Giorgia Moll for Phuong. Mankiewicz, influenced by the climate of anti-Communism and the Hollywood blacklist, altered the message of Greene's book, changing major parts of the story. He told film critic Arthur Knight after filming had wrapped, he wanted to "make the American both more credible and truer to the earnest, hardworking, apolitical types that he found in Indo-China." According to Greene, his cautionary tale about America's blind support for anti-Communists was turned into "propaganda film for America". Upon its release, several American film critics acknowledged Mankiewicz's deviations from Greene's novel but praised the film. However, the film was a commercial disappointment at the box office.

While preparing The Quiet American, in 1956, Mankiewicz recruited film producer Walter Wanger to work for Figaro. Wanger proposed numerous film projects, but most of these were turned down. After six months of no progress, Wanger proceeded with a star vehicle for Susan Hayward. By October 1957, Figaro had signed Hayward to star in I Want to Live! (1958), a real-life account of Barbara Graham's lethal execution. When a script draft was completed, Mankiewicz recommended several truncations to the script, which were made by his nephew Don Mankiewicz. Robert Wise was hired to direct the film.

Mankiewicz reunited with Sam Spiegel on Suddenly, Last Summer (1959), an adaptation of Tennessee Williams's stage play. Katharine Hepburn portrayed Violet Venable, a wealthy widow, who has her niece Catherine Holly institutionalized after she had witnessed her son Sebastian's death. Bribing the hospital with a one-million donation for renovation, Violet pushes John Cukrowicz, a neurosurgeon, to have Catherine lobotomized to preserve Sebastian's memory. Elizabeth Taylor was cast as Catherine, and it was Taylor who convinced Spiegel to cast her friend Montgomery Clift as Cukrowicz. The film earned mixed reviews from film critics but was a box office success, earning $9 million worldwide. At the 32nd Academy Awards, Hepburn and Taylor both received Oscar nominations for Best Actress.

=== 1961–1963: Cleopatra ===
By May 1960, Mankiewicz was selected to write and direct a film adaptation of Lawrence Durrell's 1957 novel Justine, the first volume of The Alexandria Quartet. Ava Gardner and David Niven were hired in the lead roles. The premise centered on Darley, an Anglo-Irish schoolmaster and aspiring novelist, who is determined to unravel the truth behind Justine, a beautiful young woman, with whom he had a brief love affair with. Darley later learns Justine was married to her Egyptian husband Nassim, who was involved in a Coptic plot against the Muslims to arm the Zionists in Palestine.

By the winter of 1960, Mankiewicz was vacationing at the Children's Bay Cay—Hume Cronyn and Jessica Tandy's private island—in The Bahamas. He had completed a 151-page treatment outline and written a partially complete first screenplay draft. On January 18, 1961, he flew north to New York for dinner with his agent Charles Feldman and Spyros Skouras, who requested him to complete Walter Wanger's concurrent troubled production Cleopatra (1963), a film project Mankiewicz's Figaro Inc. had earlier declined to finance. The film's star Elizabeth Taylor had personally requested Mankiewicz to take over the project after Rouben Mamoulian had resigned as director. Mankiewicz declined the request, but Skouras was persistent in hiring him. Feldman persuaded Mankiewicz he could resume Justine after he finished Cleopatra under the advice: "Hold your nose for fifteen weeks and get it over with."

"Cleopatra was conceived in a stage of emergency, shot in hysteria, and wound up in a blind panic."

— Mankiewicz, October 30, 1962

Skouras acquired Figaro, Inc., in which Mankiewicz was paid $1.5 million while NBC (which controlled a 50 percent stake) received the other half for a total of $3 million. On January 25, 1961, Mankiewicz was hired as writer and director. Within a month, he toured the production sets constructed at Pinewood Studios in London. Displeased with the previous script, Mankiewicz decided to write an entirely new script, with a "modern, psychiatrically rooted" approach. Lawrence Durrell and Sidney Buchman were hired to collaborate on the script for Cleopatra. By late April 1961, Mankiewicz was dissatisfied with Durrell's story outlines, while Buchman was instructed to finish the outline. Wanger hired screenwriter Ranald MacDougall to finish the shooting script based on Buchman's outline.

Meanwhile, Twentieth Century-Fox dismantled the Pinewood sets, worth an estimated $600,000 (roughly $6.6 million in 2026). Skouras decided to reshoot the film in California, but Mankiewicz persuaded him to shoot in Rome. By June 30, Skouras reversed his decision and allowed the production to film at Cinecittà, where principal photography for Cleopatra began in September 1961 under Mankiewicz's direction. Because Skouras insisted the production continue, Mankiewicz's revised shooting script was not complete at the start of filming. Therefore, Mankiewicz directed during the day and wrote the script longhand at night, to the point he contracted a dermatological disorder on his hands, which forced him to wear thin protective gloves. To maintain his health regimen for several months, Mankiewicz required daily vitamin B12 shots. One shot accidentally hit his sciatic nerve, rendering him barely able to walk.

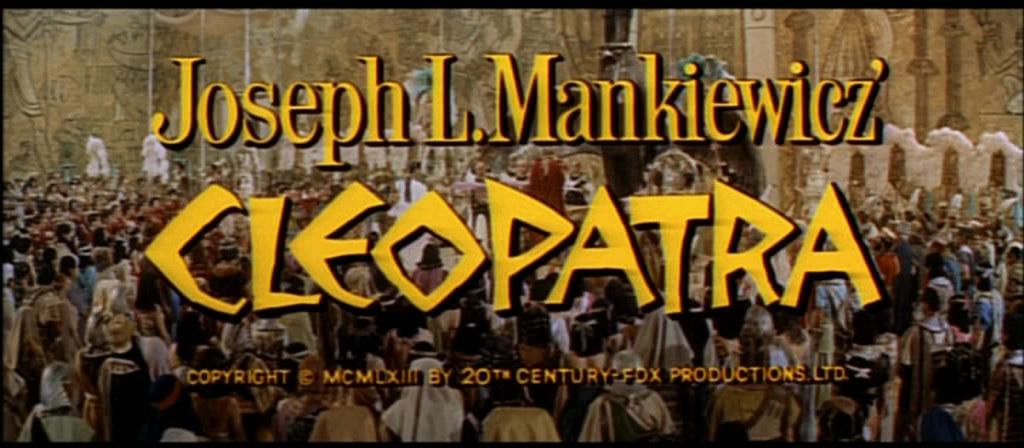
A 1963 trailer screenshot crediting the film as Joseph L. Mankiewicz' Cleopatra.

On January 22, 1962, Elizabeth Taylor and Richard Burton filmed their first scene together. Their romantic chemistry was not lost on Mankiewicz, who later told Wanger: "I have been sitting on a volcano all alone for too long, and I want to give you some facts you ought to know. Liz and Burton are not just playing Antony and Cleopatra." In February 1962, rumors of the extramarital affair were spreading, and by the spring, it became worldwide news. In June 1962, Skouras was forced out as studio president and replaced with Darryl Zanuck. In October 1962, Mankiewicz screened his rough cut for Zanuck in Paris. Infuriated by Cleopatra's dominance over Marc Antony, Zanuck remarked, "If any woman behaved toward me the way Cleopatra treated Antony, I would cut her balls off." Mankiewicz and Zanuck had planned to discuss the rough cut the next day, but Zanuck cancelled the meeting.

Less than two weeks later, Mankiewicz sent a letter to Zanuck requesting an "honest and unequivocal statement of where I stand in relation to Cleopatra." Zanuck wrote back, stating his services were terminated, and in a memo addressed to the press, he believed Mankiewicz had "earned a well-deserved rest." In response to his public firing, Mankiewicz told Time magazine: "The actors are almost more upset than I am. They gave three goddam good performances and, badly cut, they'll be ruined." In December 1962, Zanuck rehired Mankiewicz to film reshoots in Almería, Spain and complete the final editing. Mankiewicz finished the reshoots on March 5, 1963.

Cleopatra opened at the Rivoli Theatre to mixed reviews, with Bosley Crowther saying it was "one of the great epic films of our day". On the contrary, Judith Crist of the New York Herald Tribune headlined her review calling the film a "monumental mouse." The film's premiere runtime of 243 minutes was reduced to over three hours for its first-run engagements. Regardless, Cleopatra became the highest-grossing film of 1963, generating $26 million in distributor rentals. However, the film held a negative cost of $44 million and did not break even until Fox sold the television broadcasting rights to ABC in 1966. At the 37th Academy Awards, Cleopatra was nominated for nine Oscars and won four. The film's notorious production and mixed reception damaged Mankiewicz's professional reputation and self-esteem.

=== 1964–1993: Later career ===
In 1964, Mankiewicz read Frederick Knott's play Mr. Fox of Venice and the novel The Evil of the Day by Thomas Sterling, both of which were adapted from Ben Jonson's 1606 play Volpone. Interested in the subject material, Mankiewicz optioned the works for his next screenplay, tentatively titled Mr. Fox of Venice. Meanwhile, he was approached by Anna Rosenberg, a former U.S. Assistant Secretary of Defense, to participate in a Xerox-sponsored series of television films promoting the United Nations (UN). The first installment was Carol for Another Christmas (1964) with a teleplay by Rod Serling. A dystopian adaptation of Charles Dickens's A Christmas Carol, the telefilm had an ensemble cast featuring Sterling Hayden, Peter Sellers, Godfrey Cambridge, Peter Fonda, Richard Harris, Christopher Plummer, Eva Marie Saint and James Shigeta. Filming began in early September 1964. It was broadcast on ABC on December 28, 1964.

Retitled The Honey Pot (1967), the story centers on Cecil Fox, an eccentric English millionaire, who hires William McFly, a struggling actor, in a scheme modeled after Jonson's play. McFly invites three of Fox's former mistresses to his Venetian palazzo as Fox pretends to be on his deathbed. Filming began on September 20, 1965, at Cinecittà. After the first week of filming, Mankiewicz fired his cinematographer Piero Portalupi and replaced him with Gianni Di Venanzo. Before filming was complete, Di Venanzo died from undiagnosed hepatitis and was replaced by Pasqualino De Santis. Rex Harrison was cast as Fox, and his fourth wife Rachel Roberts attempted suicide after she was turned down in favor of Maggie Smith. Susan Hayward was granted permission to attend to her dying husband back in the United States. In March 1966, Mankiewicz began editing in London and settled on a runtime of 150 minutes. After he heard complaints that the film was overlong, the runtime was reduced to 131 minutes for its New York premiere. Critics complimented Rex Harrison and Maggie Smith's performances but criticized the runtime.

In 1968, Mankiewicz signed a multi-picture deal with Warner Bros.-Seven Arts, with his first project titled The Bawdy Bard and Bill, a biopic about William Shakespeare by Anthony Burgess. However, he became intrigued with an original script tentatively titled War by David Newman and Robert Benton, the screenwriting team of Bonnie and Clyde (1967). Retitled There Was a Crooked Man... (1970), it was the first Western genre film Mankiewicz had directed. He reflected: "It's been a chance to try some muscles I haven't used before. Although, of course, I wrote a lot of Westerns in the old days. The old, old days." The film starred Kirk Douglas as a charming but ruthless convict who is sent to a remote Arizona prison where the conscientious prison warden (Henry Fonda) attempts to reform him. Filming began in March 1969, but six weeks into production, Mankiewicz slipped a disc at his home and directed the rest of the film from a wheelchair.

Meanwhile, Warner Bros.-Seven Arts underwent corporate restructuring, and the film's release was delayed by over a year. It premiered in London months before its release in the United States on Christmas Day 1970, with a minimal promotional campaign. Contemporary critical reaction was mixed, though the film has been viewed more favorably in retrospect. Vincent Canby of The New York Times wrote the film was "a movie of the sort of taste, intelligence and somewhat bitter humor I associate with Mr. Mankiewicz who, in real life, is one of America's most sophisticated, least folksy raconteurs, especially of stories about the old Hollywood." Pauline Kael of The New Yorker however lambasted the film as a "commercialized black comedy nihilism seems to have been written by an evil two-year-old, and it has been directed in the Grand Rapids style of filmmaking."

During post-production on Crooked Man, in October 1969, Mankiewicz and Sidney Lumet shot eighteen minutes of interstitial segments of celebrities reading select passages for the 1970 documentary King: A Filmed Record... Montgomery to Memphis. Produced by Ely Landau, the documentary featured Harry Belafonte, Ruby Dee, Ben Gazzara, Charlton Heston, James Earl Jones, Burt Lancaster, Paul Newman, Anthony Quinn, Clarence Williams III, and Joanne Woodward. The film was screened in select theaters for only one night, March 24, 1970.

Later that year, Anthony Shaffer's 1970 play Sleuth had a successful Broadway run, and won the Tony Award for Best Play. Laurence Olivier portrays Andrew Wyke, a mystery writer, who invites Cockney hairdresser Milo Tindle (Michael Caine) to his country estate knowing that Milo is having an affair with his wife. From there, a clever mystery game ensues with potentially deadly results. At the time, Mankiewicz was developing a remake of The Front Page (1931). Filming was scheduled from April to June 1971, but production ran over schedule. Mankiewicz, plagued with back pain, tore his thigh when he fell onto camera equipment. Olivier, with his own health problems, had a real-life injury that was incorporated into the finished film.

To qualify as an eligible Oscar contender, Sleuth (1972) was rushed into completion and premiered in New York in December 1972. The film received largely positive reviews and was a moderate financial success, earning over $5.7 million at the box office. Two weeks after its premiere, Edgar Scherick, the film's executive producer, wanted an intermission and cuts made to the film leading into its nationwide release for January 1973. A Palomar Pictures studio executive notified Mankiewicz about the proposed changes even after an intermission had been inserted, which damaged the negative film. Furious over the alterations, Sleuth was restored to Mankiewicz's preference. At the 45th Academy Awards, Mankiewicz received his fourth Best Director nomination. Olivier and Caine received Oscar nominations for Best Actor.

In 1975, Robert Redford approached Mankiewicz about directing All the President's Men (1976). However, Mankiewicz did not like William Goldman's early draft of the script and decided instead to direct a film adaptation of the 1973 novel Jane by Dee Wells. Set in London, the title character unexpectedly becomes pregnant and speculates on the identity of the father. Mankiewicz signed with Columbia Pictures to write and direct the film, but he was removed during development after completing two-thirds of the script. Meanwhile, in 1978, Kenneth L. Geist published a biography of Mankiewicz titled Pictures Will Talk, having spent eight years researching his filmography.

In 1983, Mankiewicz was a member of the jury at the 33rd Berlin International Film Festival. By 1992, still search of a new project, The New York Times reported Mankiewicz was "writing in notebooks, transcribing facts, opinions and "tribal customs and taboos" for a probable autobiography.

== Personal life ==
=== Family history ===
Joseph was the younger brother of Hollywood screenwriter Herman J. Mankiewicz, the co-writer (with Orson Welles) of Citizen Kane among numerous other films. In 2024, Joseph and Herman were both announced as inductees into the Luzerne County Arts & Entertainment Hall of Fame.

In 1933, Mankiewicz met Elizabeth Young, a New York socialite and descendant of the Schermerhorn family. Young made her film debut in Big Executive (1933) and was borrowed by MGM to appear in Queen Christina (1933). They were married on May 20, 1934, in the backyard garden of Herman and his wife Sara's house. In November 1936, Mankiewicz moved out of their Beverly Hills apartment and issued a press statement stating incompatibility and irreconcilable differences. Shortly after, Young filed for divorce, alleging Mankiewicz had treated her cruelly and telling her he no longer loved her. The divorce was dropped when they resumed living together, but they filed again in May 1937. On the third anniversary of their marriage, their divorce was finalized. They had a son, Eric, who was born on July 1, 1936. In 1943, Young legally had Eric assume his stepfather Eugene Reynal's surname after she had remarried.

Mankiewicz met Austrian actress Rose Stradner, who had been contracted to MGM. There, Mankiewicz was instructed to help improve her English as he had with other German-speaking actresses. The two were married on July 28, 1939, at Mankiewicz's sister's apartment in New York. When they returned to Los Angeles, on Stradner's 26th birthday, MGM studio writers and producers greeted them at the railway station with rice and a ten-piece orchestra. Stradner gave birth to two sons, Christopher, born in 1940, and Tom Mankiewicz, born in 1942. During his marriage to Stradner, Mankiewicz had extramarital affairs with several actresses, including Judy Garland and Linda Darnell. In September 1958, Stradner was found dead at her summer home in Bedford Hills, aged 45. Her death was ruled a suicide through an overdose of sedatives.

In 1954, Mankiewicz met his third wife Rosemary Matthews while filming The Barefoot Contessa in Rome. For several years, they kept in contact, and Matthews served as a production assistant for Cleopatra. On December 14, 1962, the two were married in a New York courthouse. They had a daughter, Alexandra.

Joseph was the uncle of Frank Mankiewicz, a political campaign manager who officially announced the assassination of Democratic presidential candidate Robert F. Kennedy in 1968. His niece Johanna "Josie" Mankiewicz Davis, worked as a journalist and a novelist. In July 1974, she was struck and killed by a taxicab in New York City at the age of 36.

His great-nephews include writer-filmmaker Nick Davis (Johanna's son), NBC's Dateline reporter Josh Mankiewicz and television host Ben Mankiewicz (Frank's sons).

=== Death ===
Mankiewicz died of a heart attack on February 5, 1993, six days before his 84th birthday. He was interred in Saint Matthew's Episcopal Churchyard cemetery in Bedford, New York.

== Filmography ==
Year	Title	Director	Producer	Writer	Notes	Ref.
1929	Fast Company	No	No	Yes		
1929	The Mysterious Dr. Fu Manchu	No	No	Uncredited		
1930	Slightly Scarlet	No	No	Yes		
1930	Paramount on Parade	No	No	Yes		
1931	The Social Lion	No	No	Yes		
1931	Only Saps Work	No	No	Yes		
1931	The Gang Buster	No	No	Yes		
1931	Finn and Hattie	No	No	Yes		
1931	June Moon	No	No	Yes		
1931	Skippy	No	No	Yes		
1931	Forbidden Adventure	No	No	Yes		
1931	Sooky	No	No	Yes		
1932	This Reckless Age	No	No	Yes		
1932	Sky Bride	No	No	Yes		
1932	Million Dollar Legs	No	No	Yes		
1932	If I Had A Million	No	No	Yes	segments "Rollo and the Roadhogs" and "The Three Marines"	
1933	Diplomaniacs	No	No	Yes		
1933	Emergency Call	No	No	Yes		
1933	Too Much Harmony	No	No	Yes		
1933	Alice in Wonderland	No	No	Yes		
1934	Manhattan Melodrama	No	No	Yes		
1934	Our Daily Bread	No	No	Yes	Dialogue	
1934	Forsaking All Others	No	No	Yes		
1935	I Live My Life	No	No	Yes		
1936	Three Godfathers	No	Yes	No		
1936	Fury	No	Yes	No		
1936	The Gorgeous Hussy	No	Yes	No		
1936	Love on the Run	No	Yes	No		
1937	The Bride Wore Red	No	Yes	No		
1937	Double Wedding	No	Yes	No		
1937	Mannequin	No	Yes	No		
1938	Three Comrades	No	Yes	No		
1938	The Shopworn Angel	No	Yes	No		
1938	The Shining Hour	No	Yes	No		
1938	A Christmas Carol	No	Yes	No		
1939	The Adventures of Huckleberry Finn	No	Yes	No		
1940	Strange Cargo	No	Yes	No		
1940	The Philadelphia Story	No	Yes	No		
1941	The Wild Man of Borneo	No	Yes	No		
1941	The Feminine Touch	No	Yes	No		
1942	Woman of the Year	No	Yes	No		
1942	Cairo	No	Uncredited	No		
1942	Reunion in France	No	Yes	No		
1944	The Keys of the Kingdom	No	Yes	Yes		
1946	Dragonwyck	Yes	No	Yes		
1946	Somewhere in the Night	Yes	No	Yes		
1947	The Late George Apley	Yes	No	No		
1947	The Ghost and Mrs. Muir	Yes	No	No		
1948	Escape	Yes	No	No		
1949	A Letter to Three Wives	Yes	No	Yes		
1949	House of Strangers	Yes	No	Uncredited		
1950	No Way Out	Yes	No	Yes		
1950	All About Eve	Yes	No	Yes		
1951	People Will Talk	Yes	No	Yes		
1952	5 Fingers	Yes	No	Uncredited		
1953	Julius Caesar	Yes	No	Yes		
1954	The Barefoot Contessa	Yes	Uncredited	Yes		
1955	Guys and Dolls	Yes	No	Yes		
1958	The Quiet American	Yes	Yes	Yes		
1959	Suddenly, Last Summer	Yes	No	No		
1963	Cleopatra	Yes	No	Yes		
1964	Carol for Another Christmas	Yes	Yes	No	Television film	
1967	The Honey Pot	Yes	No	Yes		
1970	There Was a Crooked Man...	Yes	Yes	No		
1970	King: A Filmed Record... Montgomery to Memphis	Yes	No	No	Co-directed with Sidney Lumet	
1972	Sleuth	Yes	No	No		

== Accolades ==
Year	Film	Result	Category
Academy Awards
1931	Skippy	Nominated	Best Adapted Screenplay
1950	A Letter to Three Wives	Won	Best Director
1950	A Letter to Three Wives	Won	Best Adapted Screenplay
1951	All About Eve	Won	Best Director
1951	All About Eve	Won	Best Adapted Screenplay
1951	No Way Out	Nominated	Best Original Screenplay
1953	5 Fingers	Nominated	Best Director
1955	The Barefoot Contessa	Nominated	Best Original Screenplay
1973	Sleuth	Nominated	Best Director
Directors Guild of America
1949	A Letter to Three Wives	Won	Outstanding Directorial Achievement
1951	All About Eve	Won	Outstanding Directorial Achievement
1953	5 Fingers	Nominated	Outstanding Directorial Achievement
1954	Julius Caesar	Nominated	Outstanding Directorial Achievement
1981		Won	Honorary Life Member Award
1986		Won	Lifetime Achievement Award
Writers Guild of America
1950	A Letter to Three Wives	Won	Best Written American Comedy
1951	All About Eve	Won	Best Written American Comedy
1951	All About Eve	Nominated	Best Written American Drama
1951	No Way Out	Nominated	The Robert Meltzer Award
1952	People Will Talk	Nominated	Best Written American Comedy
1955	The Barefoot Contessa	Nominated	Best Written American Drama
1956	Guys and Dolls	Nominated	Best Written American Musical
1963		Won	Laurel Award for Screenwriting Achievement

Accolades for Mankiewicz's features
Year	Picture	Oscars		BAFTAs		Golden Globes	
Year	Picture	Nominations	Wins	Nominations	Wins	Nominations	Wins
1947	The Ghost and Mrs. Muir	1					
1949	A Letter to Three Wives	3	2				
1950	No Way Out	1					
1950	All About Eve	14	6	1	1	6	1
1952	5 Fingers	2				1	1
1953	Julius Caesar	5	1	3	2		
1954	The Barefoot Contessa	2	1			1	1
1955	Guys and Dolls	4		2		2	2
1959	Suddenly, Last Summer	3				2	1
1963	Cleopatra	9	4			4	
1972	Sleuth	4		4		3	
Total		48	14	10	3	19	6

=== Directed Academy Award performances ===
Under Mankiewicz's direction, these actors have received Academy Award wins and nominations for their performances in their respective roles.

Year	Performer	Film	Result
Academy Award for Best Actor
1953	Marlon Brando	Julius Caesar	Nominated
1963	Rex Harrison	Cleopatra	Nominated
1972	Michael Caine	Sleuth	Nominated
1972	Laurence Olivier	Sleuth	Nominated
Academy Award for Best Actress
1950	Anne Baxter	All About Eve	Nominated
1950	Bette Davis	All About Eve	Nominated
1959	Katharine Hepburn	Suddenly, Last Summer	Nominated
1959	Elizabeth Taylor	Suddenly, Last Summer	Nominated
Academy Award for Best Supporting Actor
1950	George Sanders	All About Eve	Won
1954	Edmond O'Brien	The Barefoot Contessa	Won
Academy Award for Best Supporting Actress
1950	Celeste Holm	All About Eve	Nominated
1950	Thelma Ritter	All About Eve	Nominated

== In popular culture ==
- Several fictional films shown in The Kentucky Fried Movie (1977) are jokily produced by a fictional movie producer, "Samuel L. Bronkowitz" (a conflation of Samuel Bronston and Joseph L. Mankiewicz).
- In Mank (2020), a Netflix biopic of his brother Herman, Joseph is portrayed by Tom Pelphrey.
