= Ulveling =

Ulveling is a surname. Notable people with the surname include:

- Jean Ulveling (1796–1878), Luxembourgian statesman
- Ralph Ulveling (1902–1980), American librarian
