= Triangle Books =

Triangle Books may refer to:

- Triangle Books, an imprint by Reynal & Hitchcock, of hardbound, inexpensive reprint editions published between 1933 and 1949.
- Triangle Books, an imprint of Society for Promoting Christian Knowledge, a charity founded in 1698
