= Ralph Ulveling =

American librarian (1902–1980)

Ralph A. Ulveling

President of the American Library Association
- In office 1945–1946
- Preceded by: Carl Vitz
- Succeeded by: Mary U. Rothrock

Personal details
- Born: Ralph Adrian Ulveling; May 9, 1902 Adrian, Minnesota, US
- Died: March 21, 1980 (aged 77)
- Spouse: Elizabeth Baer (m. 1939)
- Children: 3
- Education: Columbia University
- Occupation: Librarian

Ralph Adrian Ulveling (May 9, 1902 – March 21, 1980) was an American librarian best known for his support of intellectual freedom, interracial understanding, and the advancement of the library and information science profession. He is listed as one of the most important contributors to the library profession during the 20th century by the journal American Libraries.

== Education and early career ==
Ulveling was born in Adrian, Minnesota.

He earned the undergraduate degree at DePaul University and then served as Reference Assistant at the Newberry Library in Chicago from 1924 to 1926. He moved to Texas and became librarian at the Potter County Library in Amarillo, Texas from 1926 to 1927.

He attended the Columbia University School of Library Service in New York City from 1927 to 1928.

== Career ==
As Chief of Branches for the Detroit Public Library, Ulveling oversaw the creation of the Detroit system for self-book-charging and the opening of the Parkman Branch Library.

While serving as the associate director of the Detroit Public Library from 1934 to 1941 and as chairman of the Legislative Committee of the Michigan Library Association (MLA), Ulveling won the first state aid for libraries in Michigan from the Michigan legislature in 1937. As President of the MLA from 1937 to 1938, he was instrumental in the creation of the Michigan State Board for Libraries by the Michigan legislature. After his tenure as president of the MLA, Ulveling served on the Michigan State Board for Libraries from 1938 to 1939.

Ulveling oversaw the continued expansion of the Detroit Public Library system with the opening of the Mark Twain branch library in 1939 and the Bookmobile service in 1940. Soon after, Ulveling became Director of the Detroit Public Library in 1941, a position he would serve in for over 26 years. In 1944 he prevented the Detroit police department from removing Strange Fruit by Lillian Smith from the library shelves, but on the other hand, he felt that librarians had an obligation to guide readers in "right thinking."

In 1942, Ulveling helped form the Friends of the Detroit Public Library, a group of community leaders dedicated to advancing the DPL through fundraising and public awareness activities.

As President of the American Library Association (ALA) from 1945 to 1946, Ralph Ulveling served as member of the First U.S. National Commission for the United Nations Educational, Scientific, and Cultural Organization (UNESCO).

Ulveling challenged the ALA's newly adopted "Statement on Labeling" in 1951 with a proposal to segregate library materials containing propaganda into the reference collection and to make them available only to "researchers." His proposal forced the Intellectual Freedom Committee to confront the lack of consensus on intellectual freedom issues within the association.

In 1957, Ulveling inadvertently created a nationwide censorship controversy when his disparaging remarks about The Wizard of Oz were printed in the Lansing State Journal. Ulveling criticized the book's "negativism" and said that "instead of setting a high goal...it drags young minds down to a cowardly level". Leading national publications and the author's son Frank Joslyn Baum editorialized against Ulveling's comments. Ulveling responded that not adding new copies of the book was "not banning...it is selection."

== Selected publications ==
- Ulveling, Ralph A. (Summer 1965). "Metropolitan Areas Growing and Under Stress: The Situation of the Detroit Public Library". Library Trends. 14 (1). hdl:2142/6225.
- Ulveling, Ralph A. (January 1963). "Problems of Library Construction". The Library Quarterly. 33 (1): 91–101. doi:10.1086/619085.
- Ulveling, Ralph A. (Winter 1959). "The Public Library—An Educational Institution?". Library Resources and Technical Services. 3: 14ff.
- Ulveling, R. A. (1954). "Library and adult education". ALA Bulletin. 48: 197–200.
- Ulveling, R. A. (1952). "Reply to the CIF committee". ALA Bulletin. 46: 73–76.
- Ulveling, R. A. (1949). "Catalogers can stop cold war". Library Journal. 74: 9–11.
- Ulveling, R. A. (1945). "In the people's interest". ALA Bulletin. 39: 227–231.
- Ulveling, Ralph A. (February 1, 1943). "A Library in Wartime". Library Journal. 68: 113–116.
- Ulveling, R. A. (1941). "Organizing a public library for adult education". Library Occurrent. 13: 247–252.
- Ulveling, R. A. (1939). "Administration of branch systems". Current Issues in Library Administration. pp. 135–162.

== Personal life ==
Ralph Ulveling married the former Elizabeth Baer on December 16, 1939, and had three children, daughters Honor (b. 1942) and Ann (b. 1947), and son, Roger (b. 1943).

Non-profit organization positions
Preceded by Carl Vitz	President of the American Library Association; 1945–1946	Succeeded by Mary U. Rothrock
