= Elizabeth Young (actress) =

American actress (1913–2007)

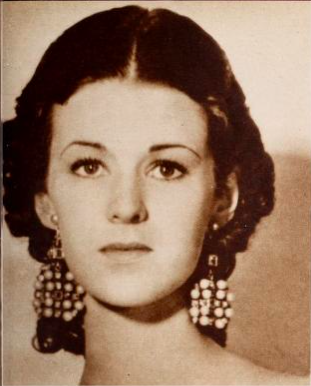
- Young in Silver Screen magazine, 1934
- Born: September 3, 1913; New York City, US
- Died: March 2, 2007 (aged 93); Sarasota, Florida, US
- Resting place: New Preston, Connecticut
- Education: Spence School
- Occupation: Actress
- Years active: 1930s
- Known for: Queen Christina
- Spouses: Joseph L. Mankiewicz (m. 1934; div. 1937); Eugene Reynal (m. 1938; div. 1946); Hugh Walker (after 1948); Henry Darbee (m. 1971)
- Children: 1

Elizabeth Young (September 3, 1913 – March 2, 2007) was an American actress. She appeared in four movies of the mid-1930s: Big Executive (1933), Queen Christina (1933), There's Always Tomorrow (1934), and East of Java (1935).

Young was the daughter of a judge, and was educated at Spence School in New York City. She first acted on Broadway, then in Hollywood. During World War II, Young was active in the American Red Cross.

Young was the first wife of writer-director-producer Joseph L. Mankiewicz, with whom she had a son, Eric. She was next married to publisher Eugene Reynal; they divorced in 1946. In 1948, Young wed Hugh Walker, a furniture manufacturer. Young's final husband was Henry Darbee, a Connecticut architect, whom she married in 1971.
