= Carl Vitz =

American librarian and author

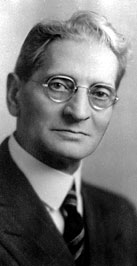

President of the American Library Association
- In office 1944–1945
- Preceded by: Althea Warren
- Succeeded by: Ralph A. Ulveling

Personal details
- Born: June 3, 1883 Saint Paul, Minnesota
- Died: January 1, 1981 (aged 97) Fort Thomas, Kentucky
- Education: Case Western Reserve University; Adelbert College; New York State Normal College
- Occupation: Librarian

Carl Peter Paul Vitz (June 3, 1883 – January 1, 1981) was an American librarian and author. He received a certificate from Western Reserve University Library School, a degree from Adelbert College and a bachelor's degree in library science from New York State Library School at New York State Normal College. He served as a library director for the Toledo-Lucas County Public Library (1922–1937), the Minneapolis Public Library (1937–1945) and the Public Library of Cincinnati and Hamilton County (1946–1955).

He served as the president of the American Library Association from 1945 to 1946. During that time, Vitz wrote a letter to the President of the United States on behalf of the profession, addressing potential candidates for the vacant position of Librarian of Congress. In the letter, Vitz suggested that the position "requires a top-flight administrator, a statesman-like leader in the world of knowledge, and an expert in bringing together the materials of scholarship and organizing them for use—in short, a distinguished librarian".

Vitz was honored by the American Library Association with the Joseph W. Lippincott Award in 1952.

Over the course of his career, Vitz planned or consulted on more than sixty library projects involving construction, site selection and remodeling.

== Publications ==
- Demobilization and the library, the library's part in military and industrial readjustment: a working memorandum (American Library Association, 1943)
- Circulation work (American library Association, 1927)
- Current problems in public library finance (American library Association, 1933)
- A federal library agency and federal library aid (American library Association, 1935)
- Loan Work (American Library Association, 1919)

Non-profit organization positions
Preceded by Althea Warren	President of the American Library Association; 1944–1945	Succeeded by Ralph A. Ulveling
