= Gladys English =

American librarian and editor

- Died: December 5, 1956 (aged 70); Los Angeles, California, U.S.
- Occupations: Librarian and editor

Gladys Ann English (d. December 5, 1956) was an American librarian and editor known for her work as Head Librarian of the Children's Department at the Los Angeles Central Library and roles as Coordinator of Children's Services and Director of Work with Children for the Los Angeles Public Library system. In 1939, English served as chairperson of the Newbery Medal Selection Committee, and sat as a member of the committee for 1936 and 1945. In October 1942, she became the first-ever editor of Top of the News, an eight-page news quarterly serving the ALA Division of Libraries for Children and Young People (DLCYP).

== Career ==
English worked for the library system from 1930 through 1950.

=== Gladys English Collection of Original Illustration for Children’s Books ===
After her death in 1956, English's life partner, librarian Althea Warren, established the American Library Association's Gladys English Memorial Collection, also called the Gladys English Collection of Original Illustration for Children’s Books, or the Gladys English Collection for short. Warren spent the better part of two years growing the collection, soliciting books, pieces of art, and other items from hundreds of sources, from artists to librarians to publishers. The collection consists of 12 large cases of over 200 original children's books illustrations and other media, including the original work of 20 Caldecott Medal recipients. Illustrators whose works are part of the conglomeration include Leo Politi, Tomie dePaola, Jean George, Evaline Ness, Leo Lionni, and others.

=== Gladys English Database ===
The Los Angeles Public Library has a database named in English's honor. The database provides public access to the Gladys English Collection.

== Personal life ==
English lived with her life partner, librarian Althea Warren, in a variety of locations across Los Angeles including Palos Verdes and Eagle Rock.
