= 1st Directors Guild of America Awards =

- Date: 1949
- Country: United States
- Presented by: Directors Guild of America

Highlights
- Best Director Feature Film: A Letter to Three Wives – Joseph L. Mankiewicz
- Website: https://www.dga.org/Awards/History/1940s/1948.aspx?value=1948

The 1st Directors Guild of America Awards, honoring the outstanding directorial achievements in film in 1948, were presented in 1949.

== Winners and nominees ==
=== Film ===
Feature Film

Joseph L. Mankiewicz – A Letter to Three Wives

- Howard Hawks – Red River
- Anatole Litvak – The Snake Pit
- Fred Zinnemann – The Search

=== Special awards ===
Honorary Life Member Recipient

Rex Ingram
