= There's Always Tomorrow (1934 film) =

1934 film by Edward Sloman

- Theatrical release poster
- Directed by: Edward Sloman
- Screenplay by: William Hurlbut
- Based on: There's Always Tomorrow; 1929 novel by Ursula Parrott
- Produced by: Carl Laemmle Jr.
- Starring: Frank Morgan; Binnie Barnes; Lois Wilson; Louise Latimer; Elizabeth Young; Alan Hale Sr.
- Cinematography: Norbert Brodine
- Edited by: Daniel Mandell
- Music by: Arthur Kay
- Production company: Universal Pictures
- Distributed by: Universal Pictures
- Release date: November 1, 1934
- Running time: 86 minutes
- Country: United States
- Language: English

There's Always Tomorrow is a 1934 American drama film directed by Edward Sloman and written by William Hurlbut from the 1929 novel by Ursula Parrott. The film stars Frank Morgan, Binnie Barnes, Lois Wilson, Louise Latimer, Elizabeth Young, and Alan Hale Sr. The film was released on November 1, 1934, by Universal Pictures.

== Plot ==
Joseph White is disappointed when his wife Sophie decides to stay home with their five grown children rather than celebrate their wedding anniversary with him, as she constantly neglects him. That night, Joseph is unable to find a quiet spot in the house where he can read his newspaper and ends up on the porch. Alice Vail, Joseph's former secretary, comes to the house and surprises Joseph, whom she has not seen for years. Alice and Joseph fell in love when they worked together, but never consummated the relationship, and Alice left for Europe. Joseph is delighted with her company and while he goes in the house to get a coat, Alice meets his youngest daughter Marjorie, who tells her how her father is ignored by the family. Alice and Joseph go to the theater together and have a wonderful time, and later, Joseph learns that she has never married. On one of his Thursday lodge nights, Joseph is forced to take the streetcar in the snow because his children have borrowed his car. The children happen to see him go into Alice's house that night and park outside to see what happens. Hours later, Joseph leaves, but the car will not start. Realizing who they are, Alice invites Joseph's children in while they wait for the tow truck. The eldest, Arthur, is so shocked and offended by his father that he is barely civil to Alice, but his fiancé Helen Graham, and his brothers and sisters, Janet, Marjorie, and the twins, Dick and Fred, graciously accept her hospitality. Alice cleverly tells them the story of her platonic relationship with Joseph without revealing his identity, and also reveals that she is aware that Joseph has been lonely because his family is selfish and treats him as a helper, rather than a father. Upon returning home, everyone except Arthur is kinder to Joseph. By the next Thursday night, however, they are all determined to prevent him from leaving, knowing that he will go to Alice's rather than the lodge. Just as he is about to leave, Alice comes to the door to say goodbye, as she has decided to return to Europe. She pretends that Helen left her purse at her house and finishes her "story" with the children: the man she fell in love with was never in love with her. Outside, Alice tells Joseph that Helen warned her of his children's feelings and that she knows he does indeed love her, but that the happiness of his family is more important than her own. Joseph pleads with her not to leave, but Alice knows better and departs. A little later, Joseph joins Sophie as she walks to the movie theater, and she reaffirms her love for him.

== Cast ==
- Frank Morgan as Joseph White
- Binnie Barnes as Alice Vail
- Lois Wilson as Sophie White
- Louise Latimer as Janet White
- Elizabeth Young as Helen Graham
- Alan Hale Sr. as Henry
- Robert Taylor as Arthur White
- Maurice Murphy as Fred White
- Dick Winslow as Dick White
- Helen Parrish as Marjorie White
- Margaret Hamilton as Ella

== See also ==
- There's Always Tomorrow (1956 film)
