= East of Java =

1935 film by George Melford

- Directed by: George Melford
- Written by: James Ashmore Creelman; Gouverneur Morris; Paul Perez
- Produced by: Paul Kohner
- Starring: Charles Bickford; Elizabeth Young; Frank Albertson
- Cinematography: Norbert Brodine
- Edited by: Maurice Wright
- Music by: Franz Waxman; Heinz Roemheld
- Production company: Universal Pictures
- Distributed by: Universal Pictures
- Release date: December 1, 1935
- Running time: 72 minutes
- Country: United States
- Language: English

East of Java is a 1935 American drama film directed by George Melford and starring Charles Bickford, Elizabeth Young and Frank Albertson.

== Cast ==
- Charles Bickford as Red McGovern aka Harvey Bowers
- Elizabeth Young as Ann Martin
- Frank Albertson as Larry Page
- Leslie Fenton as Captain Wong Bo
- Sig Ruman as Hans Muller
- Clarence Muse as First Mate Johnson
- Jay Gilbuena as Lee
- Frazer Acosta as Lute
- Charles McNaughton as 'Sloppy Alf'
- Edgar Norton as Resident

== Bibliography ==
- Goble, Alan. The Complete Index to Literary Sources in Film. Walter de Gruyter, 1999.
