= Strange Fruit (novel) =

1944 novel by Lillian Smith

- First edition
- Author: Lillian Smith
- Cover artist: Richard Floethe
- Language: English
- Publisher: Reynal and Hitchcock
- Publication date: February 29, 1944
- Publication place: United States
- Media type: Print
- ISBN: 0151857695

Strange Fruit is a 1944 bestselling debut novel by American author Lillian Smith that deals with the then-forbidden and controversial theme of interracial romance. Its working title was Jordan Is So Chilly, but Smith retitled it Strange Fruit prior to publication. In her 1956 autobiography, singer Billie Holiday wrote that Smith named the book after her 1939 song "Strange Fruit", which was about lynching and racism against African Americans. Smith maintained the book's title referred to the "damaged, twisted people (both black and white) who are the products or results of our racist culture."

After the book's release, it was banned in Boston and Detroit for "lewdness" and crude language. Strange Fruit was also banned from being mailed through the U.S. Postal Service until President Franklin D. Roosevelt interceded at his wife Eleanor's request.

== Plot ==
Strange Fruit takes place in a Georgia town in the 1920s and focuses on the relationship between Tracy Deen, son of prominent white townspeople, and Nonnie, a beautiful and intelligent young Black woman whom he once rescued from an attack by white boys. The two have a secret affair, and Nonnie becomes pregnant by Tracy, who secretly plans for her to marry "Big Henry," whom she despises, while he marries the good white girl his parents expect him to marry. He changes his mind after a conversation with a local preacher and intends to make his relationship with Nonnie public. Instead, he tells Nonnie of his original intent to have her marry Big Henry, having paid him money to do so. Nonnie's brother learns of Big Henry's payments from Tracy and the reason behind Big Henry's impending marriage to Nonnie. This prompts Nonnie's brother to kill Tracy. When Tracy's body is discovered by Big Henry, Big Henry is accused of murder and lynched.

== Publication history ==
Strange Fruit was first published on February 29, 1944, by Reynal and Hitchcock and sold approximately one million hardback copies. It went through two printings as an Armed Services Edition. It was republished through Penguin's Signet Books imprint (1948, several reprints), and several other publishers such as UGA Press (1985, with a foreword by Fred Hobson), Mariner Books (1992), and Harcourt Brace Jovanovich through their Harvest imprint (1992).

The book has been published in multiple languages, including French (2006, Phébus), Swedish (1980, with foreword by Anders Österling), and Hebrew (אור עם).

== Bannings ==
Strange Fruit was banned in Boston and Detroit for charges of lewdness and language on March 20, 1944, making the book the first "#1 Bestseller" to be banned in Boston. Cambridge Police Chief Timothy J. O'Leary and the Boston Bookseller's Association both endorsed the book's banning, also asking for Smith to censor her work, removing "three lines of 'sexual phraseology.'" A letter in The Harvard Crimson criticized the Boston ban and the allegations of obscenity, saying that the usage of "an objectionable word" in Strange Fruit occurred during a scene when Nonnie is overcome by the "cruelty of her situation" and the memories of the "brutalities she has ever known", causing the book to be "the reverse of obscene".

The United States Postal System temporarily banned interstate shipping of the novel in May 1944. The ban only lasted three days, as publisher Curtice Hitchcock successfully appealed to First Lady Eleanor Roosevelt to urge her husband to lift the ban.

The ban in Detroit was overturned after the United Auto Workers and Detroit Public Library worked together to appeal it. An attempt was made to overturn the ban in Boston by the Massachusetts Civil Liberties Union and Bernard DeVoto. DeVoto made a public purchase of Strange Fruit in the Harvard Law Book Exchange, which resulted in charges being laid against the Book Exchange. The store owner was found guilty of selling the book, which was seen as obscene material, and was fined $200. The judge presiding over the trial, District Court Judge Arthur P. Stone, remarked that the book was "obscene, tending to corrupt the morals of youth". The case was unsuccessfully appealed to the Superior Court, leaving the book "technically" banned in Boston as of 1990.

Of the book's banning, Smith commented: "These people fear a book like Strange Fruit with a profound dread; and will seize on any pretext, however silly, to keep others and themselves, from having access to it."

== Adaptations ==
=== Stage play ===
In 1945 Smith adapted Strange Fruit into a stage play, directed by José Ferrer with Jane White starring as Nonnie and Mel Ferrer as Tracy. The play was José Ferrer's first production, with him choosing to have Smith adapt the play as he "didn't quite see how another playwright could capture so authentic and so personal a flavor as she already had". Smith wrote the majority of the play over the course of 1945, presenting a second draft to Ferrer in June of that year. A Baptist minister in Philadelphia initially sought to have the play banned in the city, claiming that the play would contribute towards a "depraved society". For its run in Boston, the city required that the play have several parts omitted before it was allowed to open there. The stage play was to be a large production, with multiple large set changes, 12 scenes, and a large cast of more than 30 actors and 35 stagehands.

The play premiered in Montreal on October 13, 1945, moving to New York later that winter. Reception for the play was predominantly negative, with The New York Times remarking that although Smith had the "best of intentions", her inexperience with playwriting kept Strange Fruit from being satisfactory. The Baltimore Afro-American wrote that the veteran actors kept the play from "falling apart" but that the overall drama was "sprawling, cluttered and clumsy". Paul Robeson voiced his support for the play, saying that he wished "every American could see 'Strange Fruit'".

After the play completed its tour, Smith decided against allowing any further productions to be performed, calling it a "bitter and terrible fiasco". Smith's sister, Esther, has stated that the version of the stage play that was performed was not the original version that Smith preferred and that this version had been destroyed in a house fire in 1955.

=== Short film ===
In 1978, a short film adaptation of Strange Fruit was filmed as a thesis film for the Center for Advanced Film Studies, with the movie being produced and directed by Seth Pinsker and the screenplay being written by Stephen Katz. The short was released in 1979 and was nominated for an Academy Award at the 51st Academy Awards for Best Live Action Short, but lost to Taylor Hackford's Teenage Father.

The film is very loosely adapted from Smith's book and the Holiday song, with the focus of the story changing from an interracial romance to center on Henry, who has been made into an African-American painter. The film's time period is shifted to 1948 and portrays Henry as he is reluctantly persuaded to participate in an upcoming election. As a result, Henry is lynched, prompting his community into action. Strange Fruit was shot on 16 mm film.

== Themes ==
Themes in Strange Fruit include racism, interracial romance, and how racism affected the people and community around it. Of the book, Ellen Goldner (2001) wrote that:

In Smith's hands, then, "strange fruit" refers not to black bodies swaying in the summer breeze ... but to the damaged, "split", primarily white people raised in a culture of deep racial, sexual, and class-based taboos and conflict. For Smith, racism worked as an ambient, often disembodied, but vicious and relentless pressure on a culture, both white and black, all too frequently too weak to fight it.

Gary Richards (2007) wrote that there were hints of same-sex attraction between Tracy's sister Laura and a teacher, Jane Hardy, which her mother Alma confronts her about and Laura denies, with one of the goals of the book being to "facilitate both racial and sexual tolerance". Grace Elizabeth Hale (2009) argued that the book targeted positive images of the "gallant South", comparing regional politics to "contemporary global and national movements".

The book also deals with the issue of the sexual exploitation of African-American females. Cheryl Johnson, in 2001, remarked that in one scene Smith depicts an attack on a six-year-old Nonnie by several white boys, who only stop once Tracy intervenes. They are initially confused by his actions, but eventually assume that Tracy stopped them because she "belongs" to him, as they did not see the molestation of an African-American girl as being wrong or anything to be punished for.

== Reception ==
Initially, the book was met with controversy over its depiction of interracial romance and sex, with the book being banned from several locations including the United States Post Office. The book sold well and within a few months of its initial publication in February, topped the bestseller list of the New York Times Book Review.

A Georgia newspaper complained that the relationship in the book made "courtship between Negroes and whites appear attractive" and Smith worried that the focus on the romance in the book would detract from its political message. A reviewer for the Milwaukee Journal called the book a "great opera" and "indicts the thing called 'white supremacy'". A 1944 review from The Rotarian praised the novel, calling it "absorbingly dramatic" and citing its realism as a highlight. Johnson remarks that Smith refrained from portraying Nonnie in any of the then typical "racist stereotypes of black women as either mammies or Jezebels", making her "closer to images of the 'ideal' white woman: beautiful, kind, compassionate, and loving. For Smith, Nonnie simply happens to be black". Johnson further wrote that Nonnie was not written to be ashamed of her blackness, nor written to be an "honorary white woman".

== In popular culture ==
The Cambridge, Massachusetts restaurant The Friendly Toast included a drink called Strange Fruit on a menu of cocktails named after banned books. In 2015 this generated controversy, as a patron took the name as a reference to the song of the same name and found it inappropriate. The drink was later removed from the menu.
