= Althea Warren =

Director of the Los Angeles Public Library, president of the American Library Association

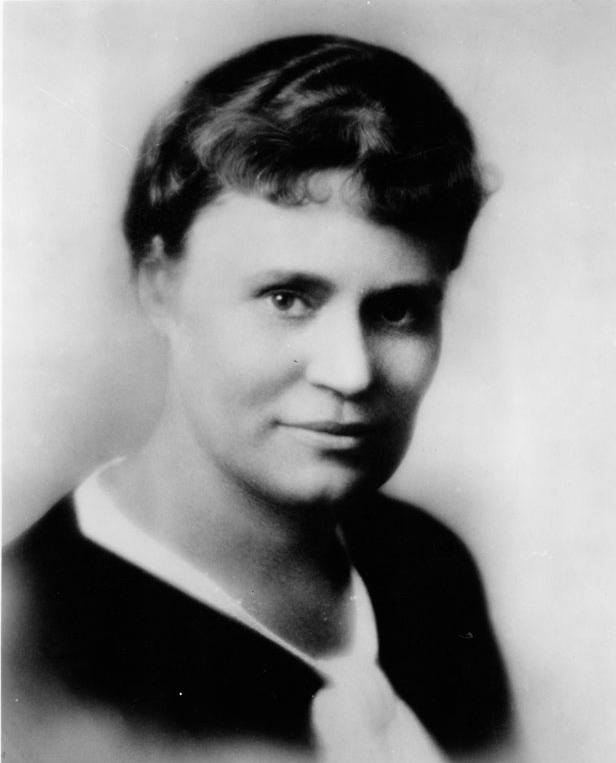

President of the American Library Association
- In office 1943–1944
- Preceded by: Keyes D. Metcalf
- Succeeded by: Carl Vitz

Personal details
- Born: December 18, 1886 Waukegan, Illinois, US
- Died: December 19, 1958 (aged 72)
- Occupation: Librarian

Althea Hester Warren (December 18, 1886 – December 19, 1958) was the director of the Los Angeles (California) Public Library from 1933 to 1947 and president of the American Library Association in 1943-1944. She was inducted into the California Library Association's Library Hall of Fame in 2013.

== Biography and career ==
Warren was born on December 18, 1886, in Waukegan, Illinois, to Lansing Warren and Emma Blodgett. She attended the University of Chicago from 1904 to 1908. After traveling abroad in Europe, Warren started library school at the University of Wisconsin, graduating in 1911. She was a branch manager in a "poor neighborhood" in the Chicago Public Library system, and she also managed a branch in the Sears, Roebuck store in that city, which served the store's employees. In 1914 she relocated with her family to San Diego, California, and during World War I she helped furnish books to soldiers at Camp Kearny, California, outside of San Diego. She worked in the San Diego Public Library system and was the head librarian there from 1916 to 1926. She moved to the Los Angeles Public Library in the latter year, having been chosen to oversee all the system's branch libraries. In 1933 she became LAPL head librarian, one of six women overseeing large public libraries in the United States at that time.

In November 1941, Warren, who was considered "#1 in the field of Women Librarians," took a leave from her Los Angeles job to become director of the ALA's National Defense Book Campaign, which sought to collect and organize distribution of books to American servicemen. The campaign, headquartered in New York City, eventually became known among her closest friends as "Warren's child." Warren was California Library Association president in 1921 and American Library Association (ALA) president in 1943-1944. She worked on the national level to increase federal aid to libraries and to end discrimination faced by African American librarians at ALA conference hotels.

Warren retired in 1947 and then taught in library science programs in Wisconsin and Michigan and at the University of Southern California.

Non-profit organization positions
Preceded by Keyes D. Metcalf	President of the American Library Association; 1943–1944	Succeeded by Carl Vitz

== Personal life ==
Warren had a romantic relationship with Gladys English, the Los Angeles Public Library's head of the Children's Department. They lived and travelled together for years. After English died, Warren created the American Library Association's Gladys English Memorial Collection, also called the Gladys English Collection.
