= Reynal & Hitchcock =

Publishing company in New York

- Status: Defunct
- Founded: 1933
- Founder: Eugene Reynal and Curtice Hitchcock
- Successor: Harcourt, Brace
- Country of origin: United States
- Headquarters location: New York City, New York, U.S.

Reynal and Hitchcock was a publishing company in New York City. Founded in 1933 by Eugene Reynal and Curtice Hitchcock, in 1948 it was absorbed by Harcourt, Brace.

== Books published ==
- Mary Poppins by P. L. Travers (1934)
- The Little Prince, a 1943 illustrated classic by Antoine de Saint-Exupéry (OCLC: 290302)
- The Autobiography of a Curmudgeon, a 1943 autobiography of New Deal politician Harold L. Ickes (OCLC: 456599)
- Strange Fruit, a 1944 bestselling novel debut by American author Lillian Smith (OCLC: 5280871)

== Triangle Books ==
Triangle Books was an imprint by Reynal & Hitchcock, of hardbound, inexpensive reprint editions published between 1933 and 1949.

In 1939, Reynal & Hitchcock sold Triangle Books to Doubleday.

== See also ==
- List of publishers
