= Curtice Hitchcock =

American publisher (1892–1946)

Curtice Nelson Hitchcock (March 4, 1892 in Pittsford, Vermont – May 3, 1946), was an American publisher and in 1933 founded Reynal & Hitchcock of New York, New York, United States. He founded the firm with Eugene Reynal.

Hitchcock received an A.B. degree from the University of Vermont in 1913. He was a reporter for The New York Times in the period 1915–1917. He served in World War I. Over the period 1920–1923, he taught history and economics at the University of Chicago. He worked for Macmillan Company from 1924 to 1931, and for The Century Company from 1932 to 1933.

As a publisher, he held liberal viewpoints.
