= Big Executive =

1933 film

- Film poster
- Directed by: Erle C. Kenton
- Written by: Alice Duer Miller; Laurence Stallings
- Starring: Ricardo Cortez; Richard Bennett; Elizabeth Young; Sharon Lynn; Dorothy Peterson; Barton MacLane; Charles Middleton
- Cinematography: Harry Fischbeck
- Music by: Howard Jackson
- Production company: Paramount Pictures
- Distributed by: Paramount Pictures
- Release date: August 8, 1933
- Running time: 70 minutes
- Country: United States
- Language: English

Big Executive is a 1933 American Pre-Code drama film directed by Erle C. Kenton and written by Alice Duer Miller and Laurence Stallings. The film stars Ricardo Cortez, Richard Bennett, Elizabeth Young, Sharon Lynn, Dorothy Peterson, Barton MacLane and Charles Middleton. The film was released on August 8, 1933, by Paramount Pictures.

== Cast ==
- Ricardo Cortez as Victor Conway
- Richard Bennett as Commodore Richardson
- Elizabeth Young as Helena Richardson
- Sharon Lynn as Miss Dolly Healy
- Dorothy Peterson as Mrs. Sarah Conway
- Barton MacLane as Harry the Guide
- Charles Middleton as Sheriff
- Tenen Holtz as Pawnbroker
