= Lillian Smith (author) =

American novelist (1897–1966)

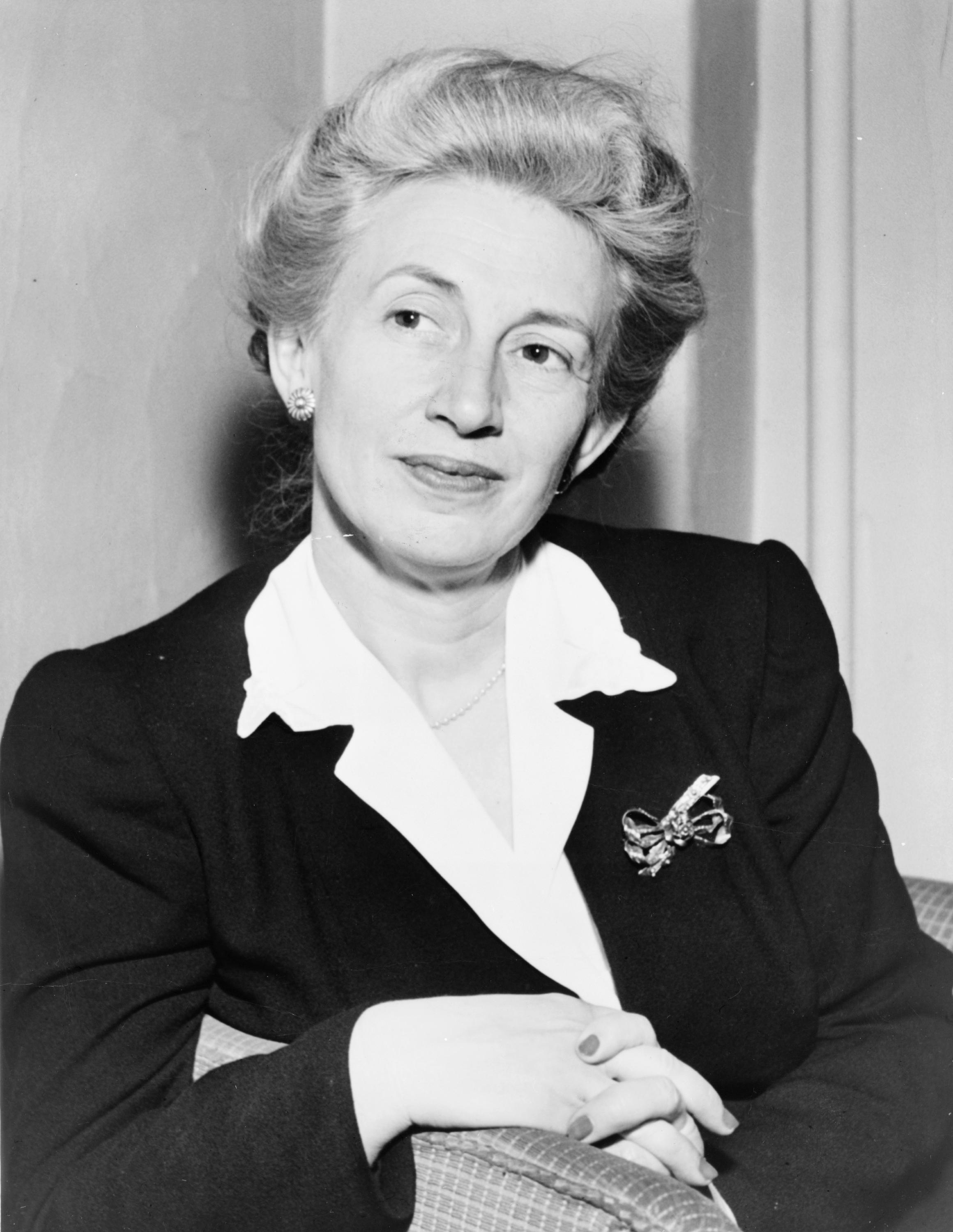
- Smith in 1944
- Born: Lillian Eugenia Smith; December 12, 1897; Jasper, Florida, U.S.
- Died: September 28, 1966 (aged 68)
- Resting place: Laurel Falls: Clayton, Georgia, U.S.
- Education: Piedmont College, Peabody Conservatory
- Occupation: Writer
- Partner: Paula Snelling
- Writing career
- Notable work: Strange Fruit (novel)
- Movement: Civil Rights Movement

Lillian Eugenia Smith (December 12, 1897 – September 28, 1966) was a writer and social critic of the Southern United States, known for both her non-fiction and fiction works, including the best-selling novel Strange Fruit (1944). Smith was a White woman who openly embraced controversial positions on matters of race and gender equality. She was a southern liberal who was unafraid to criticize segregation and to work toward the dismantling of Jim Crow laws at a time when such actions virtually guaranteed social ostracism.

== Early life ==
Smith was born on December 12, 1897, to a prominent family in Jasper, Florida, the seventh of nine children. Her life as the daughter of an upper middle-class civic and business leader took an abrupt turn in 1915 when her father lost his turpentine mills. The family was not without resources, however, and relocated to their summer residence in the mountains of Clayton, Georgia, where her father had previously purchased property. There, the family operated the Laurel Falls Camp for Girls starting in 1920.

As a young adult financially on her own, Smith was free to pursue her love of music and teaching. She spent a year studying at Piedmont College in Demorest, Georgia, (1915–16). She also had two stints at the Peabody Conservatory in Baltimore in 1917 and 1919. She returned home to help her parents manage a hotel and taught in two mountain schools before accepting a position as director of music at a Methodist school for girls in Huzhou (now Wuxing, Zhejiang), China, even though she was not a churchgoer and did not consider herself religious. This time abroad was pivotal in Smith's awareness of the Southern double standard. She studied Chinese philosophy during her time overseas and by living in China was exposed to the similarities between the suppression of the Chinese and the suppression of African Americans in the States.

As a result of her father's declining health, Smith was forced to return from China in 1925. Back in Georgia, she became the head of the Laurel Falls Camp, a position she would hold for 23 years (1925–48). Under her direction, Laurel Falls Camp soon became very popular as an innovative educational institution known for its instruction in the arts, music, drama, and modern psychology. When her father died in 1930 she took responsibility for the family business and the care of her ill mother.

== Personal life and career ==
During her time at the family camp, Lillian Smith began a lifelong relationship with one of the camp's school counselors, Paula Snelling, of Pinehurst, Georgia. The two remained closeted as a lesbian couple for the rest of their lives, as their correspondence has shown. Smith never addressed her sexuality openly. However, some of her literature's characters were lesbians. At that time, homosexuality was viewed even more negatively in Southern society than desegregation.

Smith and Snelling began publishing a small quarterly literary magazine, Pseudopodia, in 1936. The magazine encouraged writers, Black or White, to offer honest assessments of modern Southern life and to work for social and economic reform; it criticized those who ignored the Old South's poverty and racial injustice. It quickly gained regional fame as a forum for liberal thought, undergoing two name changes to reflect its expanding scope. In 1937 it became the North Georgia Review, and in 1942, the title was changed to its final form, South Today. South Today ceased publication in 1945. (All issues of Pseudopodia/North Georgia Review/South Today are available online through the Archives Online of Piedmont University Library in Demorest, Georgia.)

In 1944, Smith published the bestselling novel Strange Fruit, which dealt with the then-forbidden and controversial theme of interracial romance. The title was originally Jordan is so Chilly, with Smith later changing the title to Strange Fruit. In her autobiography, singer Billie Holiday wrote that Smith chose to name the book after her song "Strange Fruit", which is about lynching, although Smith maintained that the book's title referred to the "damaged, twisted people (both black and white) who are the products or results of our racist culture." After the book's release, it was banned in Boston and Detroit for "lewdness" and crude language. Strange Fruit was also forbidden to be mailed through the United States Postal System. The ban against the book was eventually lifted by President Franklin D. Roosevelt after his wife Eleanor requested it of him.

In 1949, Smith wrote the book Killers of the Dream, a collection of essays that attempted to identify, challenge and dismantle the Old South's racist traditions, customs and beliefs, warning that racial segregation corrupted the soul. She also emphasized the negative implications on the minds of women and children. Written in a confessional and autobiographical style that was highly critical of Southern moderates, it was largely ignored by critics of the time.

== Relationship with Paula Snelling ==
Paula Snelling was one of the individuals Lillian Smith was closest to. They shared a job as co-directors of Laurel Falls Camp for Girls. Snelling also worked as a school teacher and librarian outside of the girls camp and she wrote as well, but not much is known about her specific works. Paula Snelling was Lillian Smith's lifelong partner, but they were not out at the time because of the intense backlash that would have come with it. Starting in 1936, Smith and Snelling together published a literary magazine called South Today.

== Civil Rights activism ==
One of the ways Smith started openly discussing the problems of segregation was during her counseling of campers at Laurel Falls. This period, also referred to as the creative control over the camp, allowed her to use it as a place to discuss modern social issues, like the dangers of inequality and how to improve their society both for themselves and other women. In 1955, the civil rights movement grabbed the entire nation's attention with the Montgomery bus boycott, which started the widespread interest of this movement. By this time she had been meeting or corresponding with many southern Blacks and liberal whites for years who knew of the Blacks' concerns. In response to Brown v. Board of Education, the ruling that outlawed segregation in schools, she wrote Now Is the Time (1955), calling for compliance with the new court decision. She called the new ruling "every child's Magna Carta". She knew that both the lives of both blacks and whites depended on the integration of society.

Lillian Smith wrote various speeches and books, targeting the need for desegregation and civil rights. In December 1956, Smith wrote a speech titled “The Right Way is Not a Moderate Way” for First Annual Institute on Non-violence and Social Change. As she was unable to give this speech due to her cancer, Rufus Lewis spoke it for her. She was also close with Martin Luther King Jr and was riding with him when he was ticketed in 1960. Lillian Smith was an active member of CORE and supported SNCC, speaking at the first SNCC in October 1960. She saw the passing of the Voting Rights and Civil Rights Acts.

== Works ==
Over Lillian Smith's lifetime, she wrote various books over various topics that received both positive and negative reactions. One of Smith's most famous books is Strange Fruit, published in 1944. This work tackles the idea of interracial relationships in the South. This follows the son of a very prominent family named Tracy Deen who falls in love with Nonnie, a black woman, who he had saved from a group of white boys that were threatening to rape her. She ended up pregnant with Tracy's child. Tracy bribes their housekeeper to marry Nonnie so that their child will have a good father, one who does not have to worry about their “family image” as the child was more than likely going to be black and even mixed children were frowned on too. Especially during this time in the South, there were various opinions about interracial relationships, most of them including a racist point of view. Because of this, Strange Fruit was banned in some states after the intense amount of criticism that followed it.

Another one of Smith's most well known works is Killers of the Dream, published in 1949. This book contains Smith's memories of being a child being raised in the segregated south and the issues that come with this normalized idea along with the issues of how the South teaches sin. Smith also tackles how this affects children and adults alike, black and whites alike.

Two of Smith's lesser known works are Now is the Time and The Journey. Now is the Time, published in 1955, tackles the idea of desegregating the South and civil rights for Blacks. She calls out the cultural norms of racism and segregation. On the other hand, The Journey, published in 1954, tackles the idea of white privilege and how it affects society. Later on in the book, Smith talks about her struggle with breast cancer, which is her cause of death later on.

== Death ==
Smith battled breast cancer from the early 1950s on, ultimately dying of the disease on September 28, 1966, at the age of 68. Her book The Journey (1954) details some of this battle. She is buried near the old theater chimney at Laurel Falls camp atop Screamer Mountain, in Clayton, Georgia.

== Legacy ==
Today, Strange Fruit remains her most famous work, translated into 15 languages.

In 1999, Lillian Smith received the Georgia Women of Achievement Award.

Since 1968, the Lillian Smith Book Awards have been presented annually, except for 2003 when the Southern Regional Council experienced funding shortfalls. It is the South's oldest and best-known book award, and is presented in fiction and non-fiction categories. It is meant to honor those authors who, through their outstanding writing about the American South, carry on Smith's legacy of elucidating the condition of racial and social inequity and proposing a vision of justice and human understanding. According to Cheryl Johnson's "The Language of Sexuality and Silence in Lillian Smith's Strange Fruit", her work examines many different perspectives of American consciousness and is a great source to better understand Southern history post-Civil War through the Civil Rights Movement of the 1960s.

== Complete list of Lillian E Smith's works ==
=== Books ===
- Strange Fruit. New York: Reynal and Hitchcock, 1944.
- Killers of the Dream. New York: W.W. Norton, 1949.
- Killers of the Dream. Rev. ed. New York: W.W. Norton, 1962.
- Killers of the Dream. Rev. ed. Garden City, N.Y.: Doubleday, 1963.
- The Journey. Cleveland: World Publishing Company, 1954.
- Now Is the Time. New York: Viking, 1955.
- One Hour. New York: Harcourt, Brace & Co., 1959.
- Memory of a Large Christmas. New York: W.W. Norton, 1962.
- Our Faces, Our Words. New York: W.W. Norton, 1964

=== Articles ===
- "Burning Down Georgia's Back Porch", Common Ground, II (Winter, 1942), 69–72.
- "Southerners Talking", Common Sense, XII (June, 1943), 210–213.
- "Growing into Freedom", Common Ground, IV (Autumn, 1943), 47–52.
- "Democracy Was Not a Candidate", Common Ground, III (Winter, 1943), 7–10.
- "Humans in Bondage", Social Action, February 15, 1944, pp. 6–34.
- "Race Tragedy in the South", PM Picture News, March 5, 1944, p. M 11.
- "The Doods and the Penneys", PM Picture News, March 19, 1944, pp. M 2–3.
- "Southern Defensive", Common Ground, IV (Spring, 1944), 43–45.
- "Today's Children and Tomorrow's World", Childhood Education, XXI (September, 1944), 4–5. With Paula Snelling.
- "Addressed to White Liberals", New Republics, CXI (September 18, 1944), 331–33.
- ... In Primer for White Folks. Ed. Bucklin Moon. Garden City N.Y.: Doubleday, Doran and Co., 1945, pp. 484–87.
- "Panic Days are Recalled", The New York Times, October 27, 1944, p. 22 L.
- "Life with a Best-Seller", Atlanta Journal Magazine, January 14, 1945, pp. 5–6.
- "Personal History of Strange Fruit", Saturday Review of Literature, XXVIII (February 17, 1945), 9–10.
- "Building Christian Fellowship", The Methodist Woman, V (February 1945), 174–177, 182.
- "What Segregation Does to Our Children", Child Study, XXII (Spring, 1945), 71–72, 90.
- "Growing Plays: The Girl", Educational Leadership, II (May, 1945), 349–60.
- "How to Work for Racial Equality", New Republic, CXIII (July 2, 1945), 23–24.
- "Children Talking", Progressive Education, XXIII (October 1945), 6–9, 39–40.
- "It's Growing Time in Georgia", Nation, CLXIII (July 13, 1946), 34–36.
- "The Right to Grow", Woman's Home Companion, LXXIII (October 1946), 25.
- “Pay Day in Georgia", Nation, CLXIV (February 1, 1947), 118–119.
- "Postscript to Pay Day", Nation, CLXIV (February 22, 1947), 231.
- "Summer Camps for Boys and Girls When the Children Come to Rabun County". In Andrew J Ritchie, Sketches of Rabun County History. Clayton, GA.: n.p., 1948, pp. 429–434.
- "Let Us Dream of Children", The Church Woman, XIV (February, 1948), 4–8.
- "Southern Liberalism", New York Times, April 4, 1948, p. 8 E.
- "The Artist and the Dream", Phylon, IX (Third Quarter, 1948), 232–233.
- "A Southerner Talking", Chicago Defender, October 19, 1948, through September 3, 1949, p. 7.
- “Georgia Primer.” In Living Literature. Ed. Moiree S. Compere. New York: Appleton-Century-Crofts, 1949, pp. 56–63.
- "Why I Wrote Killers of the Dream", New York Herald Tribune Books, July 17, 1949, p. 2.
- "Ten Years From Today", Vital Speeches, XVII (August 15, 1951), 669–672.
- "The South Reacts to Segregation", New Leader, XXXIV, (September 3, 1951), 2–5.
- "A Declaration of Faith in America", New York Times Magazine, September 21. 1952, pp. 13, 39–42. Letter, October 5, 1952, Sec. VII, p. 6.
- "I Am Thinking of Jane", Redbook, CI (June, 1953), 24–25, 74–76.
- Portrait of a Family, Redbook, CII (February, 1954), 4.
- "The Unanswered Question", Confluence, III (March, 1954), 101–110.
- "Prayer for a Better World", Parents’ Magazine, XXX (December, 1955), 108.
- "The Right Way Is Not a Moderate Way", Phylon, XVII (Fourth Quarter, 1956), 335–––341.
- "The Price of Silence", New York Post, December 23, 1956, p. M 5.
- "Until We Master Our Ordeal", Civil Liberties, no. 148 (January, 1957), 2.
- "The Price of 'Moderation'" ADA World, XII (February, 1957), 3m.
- "Creative Extremists", Community, XVI (February, 1957), 3.
- "The Price of Silence", Congress Weekly, XXIV (February 25, 1957), 5–7.
- "The Right Way Is Not a Moderate Way", Fellowship, XXIII (February, 1957), 13–19.
- "The Winner Names the Age", New Leader, Xl (August 26, 1957), 12–14.
- ... Progressive, XXI (August, 1957), 6–10.
- ... Progressive, XVIII (Third Quarter, 1957), 203–212.
- "Words and the Mob", Liberation, II (November, 1957), 4–5.
- "No Easy Way, Now", New Republic, CXXXVII (December 16, 1957), 12–16.
- "Brainwashed Americans", AFRO Magazine Section, February 18, 1958, p. 5.
- "The Crisis in The South", New Leader, XLIII (September 19, 1960), 12–16.
- "The South's Moment of Truth", Progressive, XXIV (September, 1960), 32–35.
- "Novelists Need a Commitment", Saturday Review, XLIII (December 24, 1960), 18–19.
- "The Ordeal of Southern Women", Redbook, CXVII (May, 1961), 44–45.
- "Integration: What You Can Do About It", Datebook, III (June 1961), 34, 58–61.
- "The Whipping". In Strange Barriers. Ed. J. Vernon Shea. New York: Pyramid Books, 1961, pp. 171–177.
- "Memory of a Large Christmas", Life, LI (December 15, 1961), 90–94.
- Introduction to Freedom Ride, by James Peck. New York: Simon and Schuster, 1962, pp. 9–13.
- "Words That Chain Us and Words That Set Us Free", New South, XVII (March 1962), 3–13.
- "Now, the Lonely Decision for Right or for Wrong", Life, LIII (October 12, 1962), 44.
- "A Strange Kind of Love", Saturday Review, XLV (October 20, 1962), 18–20, 94. Letter, XLV (November 17, 1962), 25.
- "The Mob and the Ghost". In Black, White and Gray. Ed. Bradford Daniel. New York: Sheed and Ward, 1964, pp. 266–277.
- "The Day It Happened to Each of Us", McCall's, XCII (November, 1964), 124–125, 166–168.
- "Poets Among the Demagogues", Saturday Review, XLVIII (October 2, 1965), 24, 35.
- "Old Dream, New Killers", Atlanta Constitution, January 14, 1966, p. 4; Letter, New South, XXI (1966), 64.
- "The Final Question", Fact, III (January–February 1966), 8.
- "Response". In Red Clay Reader 3. Ed. Charleen Whisnant. Charlotte, North Carolina: Southern Review, 1966, p. 114.
- Introduction to Ely, by Ely Green. New York: Seabury, 1966, pp. v–xx.
- "The Changing Heart of the South.” In Toward a Better America. Ed. Howard D. Samuel. New York: Macmillan, 1968, pp. 67–71.
- "Bridges to Other People", Redbook, CXXXIII (September 1969), 10, 91, 152–153.
- "Letter from Lillian Smith", New South, XXV (Winter 1970), 52–54.
- "Two Men and a Bargain". In The Black Man and the Promise of America. Ed. Lettie J. Austin et al. Glenview, I11.: Scott, Forestman, 1970, pp. 223–243.

=== Book reviews ===
- New York Herald Tribune Book Review, June 18, 1944, p. 6. Rev. of Spring Harvest: A Collection of Stories from Alabama, ed. Hudson Strode.
- “The South as It Is…", New York Times Book Review, February 5, 1950, p. 3. Rev. of Southern Legacy, by Hodding Carter.
- “The Root is in Failure", New York Times Book Review, November 13, 1955, p. 36. Rev of Dark Eye of Africa, by Laurens Van der Post.
- “Negroes in Gray Flannel Suits", The Progressive, XX (February, 1956), 33–35. Rev. of How Far the Promised Land? By Walter White; The Progressive, XX (March 1956), 28–29. Continuing comments on How Far…, by Walter white.
- “And Suddenly Something Happened", Saturday Review, XLI (September 20, 1958), 21. Rev. of Stride Toward Freedom, by Martin Luther King.
- “Duels and Seductions", Saturday Review, XLIV (November 11, 1961), 21. Rev. of The Lattimer Legend, by Ann Helson.
- “Yorkshire Rebel in Silken Chains", Saturday Review, XLV (May 12, 1962), 27. Rev. of O Dreams, O Destinations: An Autobiography, by Phyllis Bentley.
- "No More Ladies in the Dark", Saturday Review, XLV (August 25, 1962), 24. Rev. of American Women: The Changing Image, by Beverly Benner Cassara.
- "Half Child, All Genius", Saturday Review, XLV (September 1, 1962), 24–25. Rev. of Charles, by Victoria Lincoln.
- "The South Speaks Softly", Saturday Review, XLVI (February 2, 1963), 29. Rev. of We Dissent: A Symposium, ed. Hoke Norris.
- “Too Tame the Shrew", Saturday Review, XLVI (February 23, 1963), 34–44. Rev. of The Feminine Mystique, by Betty Friedan.
- "Thoughts as Her Travel Ended", Saturday Review, XLVI (September 7, 1963), 19–20. Rev. of Tomorrow is Now, by Eleanor Roosevelt.
- "From Nowhere to the End of Night", Saturday Review, XLVII (April 4, 1964), 39–40. Rev, of The Crossing, by Alain Albert.
- “Thrilling Sense of a President Changing", Charlotte Observer, May 10, 1964, p. 10-D. Rev. of Mr. Kennedy and the Negroes, by Harry Golden.
- “Results Were All", New York Times Book Review, June 14, 1964, p. 10. Rev. of Mary McLeod Bethune, by Rackham Holt.
- “Facets of the South", Chicago Tribune Books Today, April 11, 1965, p. 5. Rev. of Many Thousand Gone, by Ronald L. Fair.
- "White Marble Lady", Chicago Tribune Books Today, April 11, 1965, p. 10. Rev. of White Marble Lady, by Roi Ottley.
- "With a Wry Smile Hovering Over All", Chicago Tribune Books Today, June 6, 1965, 1965, p. 5. Rev. of Everything That Rises Must Converge, by Flannery O’Connor.
- “The Post-War South", Chicago Tribune Books Today, July 11, 1965, p. 8. Rev. of The South as It Is: 1865-66, by John R. Dennett.
- "Speaking to the Human Condition", Chicago Tribune Books Today, August 22, 1965, p. 8, Rev, of The Ignoble Savages, by Mariano Picon-Salas.
- “Extraordinary Weaver of Verbal Textures", Chicago Tribune Books Today, September 12, 1965, p. 3. Rev. of Miss MacIntosh, My Darling, by Marguerite Young.
- "Savoring a Distant Experience", Chicago Tribune Books Today, October 31, 1965, p. 10. Rev. of Lad Batarde, by Violette le Duc.
- “Defending a Thinker and Poet", Chicago Tribune Books Today, November 28, 1965, p. 6. Rev. of Teilhard de Chardin: The Man and His Meaning, by Henry de Lubac.
- "Truths about Human Beings", Chicago Tribune Books Today, February 13, 1966, p. 6. Rev. of Swans on an Autumn River, by Sylvia Ashton-Warner.
- "An Optimist Looks at the Human Race", Chicago Tribune Books Today, March 13, 1966, p. 1. Rev. of The Appearance of Man, by Teilhard de Chardin.
- “A Search for Reality", Chicago Tribune Books Today, March 20, 1966, p. 6. Rev. of The Far Family, by Wilma Dykeman.
- "Magic Mixed with Truth", Chicago Tribune Books Today, March 27, 1966, p. 9. Rev. of Greenstone, by Sylvia Ashton-Warner.
- "Glimpse of a Southern Writer", Chicago Tribune Books Today, April 10, 1966, p. 8. Rev. of The Ballad of Carson McCullers, by Oliver Evans.
- "Captive of One's Own Space-Making", Chicago Tribune Books Today, June 26, 1966, p. 13. Rev. of The Hidden Dimension, by Edward T. Hall.
- Camp Books, Brochures, Miscellaneous
- Dear Susie: Being A Few Letters from Jen. Atlanta: Webb and Martin, 1939.
- "The White Christian and his Conscience", "There are Things to Do", "Buying A New World With Old Confederate Bills", "Two Men and a Bargain", "The Earth: A Common Ground for Children". Reprints of South Today.
- Laurel Leaves. 1943–1947. Camp letters.
- Information Please, About Laurel Falls Camp. Decatur, Georgia: Bowen Press, n.d.
- So You Are Coming to Laurel Falls. Decatur, Georgia: Bowen Press, n.d.
- "Lillian Smith Answers Some Questions about Strange Fruit". 1944.
- "Letter from Lillian Smith: Addressed to Members of the Blue Ridge Conference". 1944.
- "Letter from Lillian Smith on Tee Davis vs. State Arkansas Case.” March 11, 1946.
- "Report from Lillian Smith on Killers of the Dream".
- Killers of the Dream. Norton Preview. 1949.
- "The Paper Book: Filling a World Size Need".

=== Editorials and articles in South Today ===
- "Dope with Lime", Pseudopodia, I, 1 (Spring 1936), 7, 12.
- “"An Open Letter to Mr. Caldwell on Child Care", [editorial], Pseudopodia, I, 2 (Summer 1936), 8, 9.
- "Dope with Lime", Pseudopodia, I, 2 (Summer 1936), 11–12.
- ..., Pseudopodia, I, 3 (Fall 1936), 11, 16.
- ..., Pseudopodia, I, 4 (Winter 1937), 13–14, 18–19.
- ..., North Georgia Review, II, 1 (Spring 1937), 16–17.
- ..., North Georgia Review, II, 2 (Summer 1937), 2, 23–24.
- ..., North Georgia Review, II, 3 (Fall 1937), 2, 23–4.
- "Dope with Lime: A Catechism", North Georgia Review, II, 4 (Winter 1937–38), 2, 32.
- “He That Is Without Sin", North Georgia Review, II, 4 (Winter 1937–38), 16–19, 31–32.
- “Dope with Lime", North Georgia Review, III, 1 (Spring 1938), 2, 31–32.
- “Act of Penance", North Georgia Review, III, 1 (Spring 1938), 16–17.
- “Dope with Lime", North Georgia Review, III, 2 (Summer 1938), 2, 12.
- ..., North Georgia Review, III, 3 & 4 (Fall & Winter 1938–39), 2, 35–40.
- "Wanted: Lessons in Hate", North Georgia Review, III, 3 & 4 (Fall & Winter 1938–39), 12–15.
- "Dope with Lime", North Georgia Review, IV, I (Spring 1939), 2–4, 32.
- "Mr. Lafayette, yeah we is", North Georgia Review, IV, 1 (Spring 1939), 14-17.
- "Dope with Lime", North Georgia Review, IV, 2-3 (Autumn 1939), 4, 62.
- ..., North Georgia Review, IV, 4 (Winter 1939–40), 4-6.
- ..., North Georgia Review, V, 1 (Spring 1940), 4-6, 26, 42.
- "Southern Conference?” North Georgia Review, V, 1 (Spring 1940), 23-26.
- "Dope with Lime", North Georgia Review, V, 2 (Summer 1940), 23-26.
- "In Defense of Life", North Georgia Review, V, 2 (Summer 1940), 11-12.
- "Dope with Lime", North Georgia Review, V, 3-4 (Winter 1940–41), 4-8.
- "An Essay into Internationalism: I. of Epicycle and Men", North Georgia Review, V, 3–4 (Winter 1940–41), 9-17. With Paula Snelling.
- "Dope with Lime", North Georgia Review, VI, 1-4 (Winter 1941), 4-6.
- "Man Born of Woman", North Georgia Review, VI, 1-4 (winter 1941), 7-17. With Paula Snelling.
- "Dope with Lime", South Today, VII, 1 (Spring 1942), 4, 68-70.
- "Are We Not All Confused?” South Today, VII, 1 (Spring, 1942), 30-34.
- "Dope with Lime", South Today, VII, 2 (Autumn–Winter 1942–1943), 4-5, 62-63.
- "Buying a New World with Old Confederate Bills", South Today, VII, 2 (Autumn–Winter, 1942-1943), 7-30.
- "This Business of Taking It…an editorial", South Today, VII, 2 (Autumn–Winter 1942–43), 31-33.
- "Addressed to Intelligent White Southerners: 'There Are Things to Do'", South Today, VII, 2 (Autumn–Winter 1942–43), 34–43.
- "Dope with Lime", South Today, VII, 3 (Spring 1943), 4, 52.
- "Two Men and a Bargain: A Parable of the Solid South", South Today, VII, 3 (Spring 1943), 5-15.
- "Yes… We Are Southern", VII, 3 (Spring 1943), 41–44. Biographies of Lillian Smith and Paula Snelling. With Paula Snelling.
- "Dope with Lime: Susie and the Bulldozer", South Today, VII, 1 (Spring-Summer 1944), 4-6, 102-103.
- "Today's Children and Their Tomorrow", South Today, VIII, 1 (Spring–Summer 1944), 9–20. With Paula Snelling.
- "Growing Plays: The Girl", South Today, VIII, 1 (Spring–Summer 1944), 32-49.
- "Putting Away Childish Things", South Today, VIII, 1 (Spring-Summer 1944), 61-66.
- "The Southard School", South Today, VIII, 1 (Spring–Summer 1944), 79–80.
- "Dope with Lime", South Today, VIII, 2 (Winter 1945), 4–7.
- "Two Men and a Bargain: A Parable of the Solid South", South Today, VIII, 2 (Winter 1945), 37–47.
- "Author of Strange Fruit Shares Her Mail", South Today, VIII, 2 (Winter 1945), 75–87.

=== Fiction, poetry, drama in South Today ===
- "The Harris Children's Town- Maxwell, Ga.", Pseudopodia, I, 1 (Spring 1946), 3–4, 9–12.
- "Big Granny", Pseudopodia, I, 2 (Summer 1936), 4–5, 15–16.
- “Mountain Monotones: Jabe's Mule". Pseudopodia, I, 4 (Winter 1937), 5–6, 20.
- "Exegesis", North Georgia Review, II, 4 (Winter 1937–38), 7–8, 10.
- "And the Waters Flowed On", North Georgia Review, III, 2 (Summer 1938), 7–12.
- "Two Sketches", North Georgia Review, II, 3 & 4 (Fall & Winter 1938–39), 19–21.
- "Behind the Drums", North Georgia Review, IV, 2 &3 (Autumn 1939), 12–21.
- "So You're Seeing the South", North Georgia Review, IV, 4 (Winter 1939–40), 18–22.
- "Figs and Doodle Bugs", North Georgia Review, V, 1 (Spring 1940), 15–22.
- "Jordan Is So Chilly", North Georgia Review, V, 3–4 (Winter 1940–41), 31–43.
- "Portrait of the Deep South Speaking to Negroes on Morale", South Today, VII, 1 (Spring 1942), 34–37.
- "Georgia Primer", South Today, VII, 3 (Spring 1943), 29–33.
- "Behind the Drums", South Today, VIII, 1 (Spring–Summer 1944), 50.

=== Book reviews in South Today ===
- "One More Sigh for the Good Old South", Pseudopodia, I, 3 (Fall 1936), 6, 15. Rev. of Gone With the Wind, by Margaret Mitchell.
- “Out of the Gulf Stream", Pseudopodia, I, 3 (Fall 1936), 12, 13. Rev. of Green Margins, by E. P. O’Donnell, and The Tallons, by William March.
- Pseudopodia, I, 4 (Winter 1937), 7, 11. Rev. of Stubborn Roots, by Elma Godchaux.
- "Along Their Way", North Georgia Review, II, 1 (Spring 1937), 3–4, 20–22. Rev. of A Long Way from Home, by Claude McKay, and Paul Laurence Dunbar, by Benjamin Brawley.
- North Georgia Review, II, 1 (Spring 1937), 14–15. Rev. of As I Live and Breathe, by Willie Snow Ethridge.
- "The Artist in Society", North Georgia Review, II, 2 (Summer 1937), 10, 23. Rev. of Bread and Sword, by Evelyn Scott.
- North Georgia Review, II, 2 (Summer 1937), 18. Rev. of The Negro and His Music, by Alain Locke, and Rolling Along in Song, by Rosemund Johnson.
- "Wisdom Crieth in the Streets", North Georgia Review, II, 3 (Fall 1937), 3–4, 17–20. Rev. of The Civil War and Reconstruction, by J. G. Randall; The American Civil War, by Carl Russell Fish; The Road to Reunion, by Paul Buck; Reconstruction, by James Allen.
- North Georgia Review, II, 3 (Fall 1937), 17. Rev. of Negro Builders and Heroes, by Benjamin Brawley.
- North Georgia Review, II, 4 (Winter 1937–38), 21–22. Rev. of You have Seen Their Faces, by Erskine Caldwell and Margaret Bourke-White, and The Garden of Adonis, by Caroline Gordon.
- "The Fiddler Who Walked on the Waters", North Georgia Review, III, 1 (Spring 1938), 9, 24–26. Rev. of Blow For a Landing, by Ben Lucien Burman.
- North Georgia Review, III, 3 & 4 (Fall & Winter 1938–1939), 27–28. Rev. of Forty Acres and Steel Mules, by H. Clarence Nixon.
- North Georgia Review, III, 3 & 4 (Fall & Winter 1938–39), 35. Rev. of Negro Folk Tales and Negro Art, Music and Rhyme, by Helen Adele Whiting.
- North Georgia Review, IV, 1 (Spring 1939), 27–28. Rev. of Dossie Bell is Dead, by Jack Boone.
- "Southern Books: Non-Fiction: 'After all, it's Better to be Livin' than Dead", North Georgia Review, IV, 2 & 3 (Autumn 1939), 36–38. Rev. of These Are Our Lives and Faces We See, by Mildred Barnwell.
- "Paw and the Rest of Us", North Georgia Review, VI, 1–4 (Winter 1941), 39. Rev. of Men Working, by John Faulkner.

=== Other media ===
- "Miss Smith (Speaking from New York)", Northwestern University on the Air: Of Men and Books, March 4, 1944, pp. 5–6.
- "Author of Strange Fruit Sees the Race Question as a Problem Above Politics", New York Herald Tribune, October 22, 1944, sec. VIII, p. 20. Speech to Writer's Forum.
- Grayson, Mitchell. "There Are Things to Be Done", dramatization of Lillian Smith's pamphlet. March, 1945. Writer's War Board. Station WMCA, New York.
- Directions: "Ethnics in Five Acts", by Robert Lewis Shayon. ABC-TV telecast, March 3, 1963; 2–2:30 P.M.
- "Strange Fruit. Selections read by the author". Directed by Joan Titus. Recording by Spoken Arts, Inc. 1964.
- "Our Faces, Our Words". Read by Lillian Smith. Recordings by Spoken Arts, Inc. 1965.

== Selected works ==
- Strange Fruit (1944), ISBN 9781568494203, OCLC 184751847
- Killers of the Dream (1949), ISBN 9780393311600, OCLC 951462511
- The Journey, New York: Norton (1954), OCLC 745967889
- Now Is the Time, New York: Viking Press (1955), ISBN 9781578066315. OCLC 53091211
- One Hour, Chapel Hill: University of North Carolina Press (1959), OCLC 962028726 – an attack on McCarthyism in the form of a novel
- Memory of a Large Christmas, New York: Norton (1962), ISBN 9780820318424. OCLC 53263972
- Our Faces, Our Words, New York: W.W. Norton (1964), OCLC 558156250 – an ode to the non-violent resistance of the civil rights movement

== Collections ==
- The Winner Names the Age: A Collection of Writings, New York: Norton (1978), ISBN 9780393300444, OCLC 16501127
- How Am I to be Heard?: Letters of Lillian Smith, Chapel Hill: University of North Carolina Press (1993), ISBN 9780807820957, OCLC 925154234
- A Lillian Smith Reader, Athens: The University of Georgia Press (2016), ISBN 9780820349985, OCLC 965151015
