= Eugene Reynal =

American publisher (1902–1968)

- Reynal, c. 1939
- Born: Eugene St. Rose Reynal; March 31, 1902; New York City, United States
- Died: March 20, 1968 (aged 65); New York City, United States
- Occupation: Publisher
- Spouse: Elizabeth Young (m. 1938; div. 1946)

Eugene St. Rose Reynal (March 31, 1902 – March 20, 1968) was an American publisher who founded Blue Ribbon Books of Garden City, New York, and Reynal & Hitchcock (with Curtice Hitchcock) of New York City in 1933.

From 1938 to 1946, Reynal was married to Elizabeth Young, an actress who had appeared in the 1933 film Queen Christina with Greta Garbo. During World War II, Reynal served as a Captain in the Army Air Forces, stationed at one point in Miami Beach, Florida.

Louis Menand in The New Yorker wrote of Reynal that he "achieved immortality the bad way" by turning down the opportunity to publish The Catcher in the Rye.
