= Frederick Knott =

English playwright and screenwriter

- Born: Frederick Major Paull Knott; 28 August 1916; Hankou, China
- Died: 17 December 2002 (aged 86); New York City, New York
- Occupations: playwright, screenwriter
- Writing career
- Language: English

Frederick Major Paull Knott (28 August 1916 – 17 December 2002) was an English playwright and screenwriter known for complex crime-related plots. Although he was a reluctant writer and completed a small number of plays, two have become well-known: the London-based stage thriller Dial M for Murder, later filmed in Hollywood by Alfred Hitchcock, and the 1966 play Wait Until Dark, which was adapted to a Hollywood film directed by Terence Young. He also wrote the Broadway mystery Write Me a Murder.

Knott moved to the United States in September 1952. He was introduced to actress Ann Hillary a few months later, married her in 1953, and the couple lived in New York for many years. Their only son, Anthony Frederick Knott, was born in 1959.

== Life and career ==
Knott was born in Hankou, China, the son of English missionaries, Margaret Caroline (née Paull) and Cyril Wakefield Knott. He became interested in theatre after watching performances of Gilbert and Sullivan works held by the Hankow Operatic Society. Descended from a line of Lancashire mill-owners, Knott came from a wealthy enough background to be sent back to England to be schooled privately, and from 1926 he was educated at Sidcot School and then, from 1929, at Oundle School in Northamptonshire.

In 1934, Knott went up to Downing College, Cambridge, to read law. An exceptional tennis player (a profession he gave the central character in Dial M for Murder), he became a Blue, and in 1937 was a member of the Oxford-Cambridge tennis team that played the Harvard-Yale squad at Newport. He graduated in 1938 with a third-class degree in law, but the outbreak of the Second World War prevented his competing at Wimbledon.

He served in the British Army Artillery as a signals instructor from 1939 to 1946, rising to the rank of major.

Knott first conceived of Dial M for Murder in October 1949 as a half-hour television drama, but the production company, Parthian Productions, went bankrupt. He then spent eighteen months turning his idea into a stage play. Completed in April 1951, Knott's agent spent the remainder of 1951 trying to interest a London theatrical manager in producing it, but there were no takers. In the meantime, Knott was offered the opportunity to write the screenplay to The Last Page, based on a play by James Hadley Chase. The film starred George Brent, Marguerite Chapman, and Diana Dors, and was released in the U.S. as Man Bait.

In January 1952, Knott submitted Dial M to the BBC at a friend's suggestion. A ninety-minute version of the play was broadcast live on BBC's Sunday Night Theatre on Sunday, March 23, 1952, and again on Thursday, March 27, 1952. When there was still no interest in a stage production, Knott sold the screen rights to Alexander Korda for only £1,000. One month later, producer James P. Sherwood's planned June production at London's Westminster Theatre fell through, due to the star's illness, and he approached Knott's agent about producing Dial M for Murder in its place.

Dial M premiered at the Westminster Theatre on June 19, 1952, directed by John Fernald and starring Emrys Jones, Jane Baxter, and Alan MacNaughtan. This production was followed in October by a successful run in New York City at the Plymouth Theater, where Reginald Denham directed Maurice Evans, Richard Derr, and Gusti Huber. Knott also wrote the screenplay for the 1954 Hollywood movie which Hitchcock filmed for Warner Brothers in 3D, starring Ray Milland and Grace Kelly, with Anthony Dawson and John Williams reprising their characters from the New York stage production, which had won Williams a Tony Award for his role as Inspector Hubbard. The play was also made into a 1981 TV movie starring Christopher Plummer and Angie Dickinson, as the 1985 film Aitbaar in India, and as A Perfect Murder in 1998 with Michael Douglas and Gwyneth Paltrow. Based on the same plot, a Soviet TV film Tony Wendice's Mistake (ru:Ошибка Тони Вендиса) was released in 1981.

In 1959, Knott adapted Thomas Sterling's mystery novel The Evil of the Day (inspired by Ben Jonson's play Volpone) as the stage mystery Mr. Fox of Venice. The play had a short run at London's Piccadilly Theatre with a cast that included Jeremy Brett, but was never produced on Broadway. Eight years later, writer-director Joseph L. Mankiewicz adapted the Sterling novel and Knott play as the film The Honey Pot, starring Rex Harrison.

After Mr. Fox of Venice, Knott wrote the stage thriller Write Me a Murder, produced at the Belasco Theatre in New York in October 1961. It was directed by George Schaefer and included James Donald, Kim Hunter, and Denholm Elliott in the cast. The play earned Knott his second Edgar Allan Poe Award for Best Play from the Mystery Writers of America, having won his first for Dial M.

In 1966, Knott's stage play Wait Until Dark was produced on Broadway at the Ethel Barrymore Theatre. The director was Arthur Penn and the play starred Lee Remick and Robert Duvall. Remick received a Tony Award nomination for her performance. Later the same year, Honor Blackman played the lead in London's West End at the Strand Theatre. The film version of Wait Until Dark was released in 1967, with Audrey Hepburn and Alan Arkin in the lead roles. Hepburn earned Academy Award, Golden Globe, and BAFTA nominations as a result. The play was revived on Broadway in 1998, starring Marisa Tomei and Quentin Tarantino.

Knott stopped writing plays, choosing to live comfortably on the income from his earlier works. "I don't think the drive was there any more. He was perfectly happy the way things were," said his wife Ann Hillary. He died in New York City in December 2002.

== Select credits ==
=== Plays ===
- Dial M for Murder (1952)
- Mr. Fox of Venice (1959)
- Write Me a Murder (1961)
- Wait Until Dark (1966)

=== Film screenplays ===
- The Last Page (1952)
- Dial M for Murder (1954)
- The Honey Pot (1967) (based on Mr. Fox of Venice)

=== TV plays ===
- Dial M for Murder (1952) – for BBC Sunday-Night Theatre
- Hans Brinker and the Silver Skates (1958)
- Dial M for Murder (1959) (German TV movie)

== Bibliography ==
- Dial M for Murder (Samuel French, London ISBN 0-573-01102-8)
- Dial M for Murder (Random House Plays, New York 1952)
- Write Me a Murder (Dramatists Play Service Inc, New York 1962)
- Wait Until Dark (Samuel French, London ISBN 0-573-01050-1)
