= Edgar Allan Poe Award for Best Play =

Edgar Allan Poe Award for Best Play:

== Winners ==
=== 1950-1999 ===
| Year | Writer(s) | Title |
|---|---|---|
| 1950 | Sidney Kingsley | Detective Story |
| 1953 | Frederick Knott | Dial M for Murder |
| 1955 | Agatha Christie | Witness for the Prosecution |
| 1962 | Frederick Knott | Write Me a Murder |
| 1971 | Anthony Shaffer | Sleuth |
| 1980 | Ira Levin | Deathtrap |
| 1981 | Paul Nathan | Ricochet |
| 1982 | Jerome Chodorov and Norman Panama | A Talent for Murder |
| 1986 | Rupert Holmes | The Mystery of Edwin Drood |
| 1990 | Larry Gelbart | City of Angels |
| 1991 | Rupert Holmes | Accomplice |
| 1998 | David Barr III | The Red Death |
| 1999 | John Pielmeier | Voices in the Dark |

=== 2000-2012 ===
| Year | Writer(s) | Title | Result | Ref. |
|---|---|---|---|---|
| 2000 | Joe DiPietro | The Art of Murder | Winner | |
| 2003 | Philip DePoy | Easy | Winner | |
| 2005 | Neal Bell | Spatter Pattern (Or, How I Got Away With It) | Winner | |
| 2006 | Gary Earl Ross | Matter of Intent | Winner | |
| 2007 | Steven Dietz | Sherlock Holmes: The Final Adventure | Winner | |
| 2008 | Joseph Goodrich | Panic | Winner | |
| 2009 | Ifa Bayeza | The Ballad of Emmett Till | Winner | |
| 2011 | Sam Bobrick | The Psychic | Winner | |
| 2012 | Ken Ludwig | The Game's Afoot | Winner | |
| 2012 | Jeffrey Hatcher | Sherlock Holmes and the Adventure of the Suicide Club | Shortlist | |

== See also ==
- Edgar Award
- Mystery Writers of America
- Category:Edgar Award winners
- Category:Edgar Award winning works
