= The Evil of the Day =

1955 novel by Thomas Sterling

- First US edition (publ. Simon & Schuster)
- Author: Thomas Sterling
- Publisher: Gollancz (UK); Simon & Schuster (US)
- Publication date: May 17, 1955 (US edition)

The Evil of the Day is a novel by Thomas Sterling, published in 1955 by Victor Gollancz Ltd. in the United Kingdom and Simon & Schuster in the United States. The book is patterned after Ben Jonson's Elizabethan comedy Volpone, and was later adapted for the stage by playwright Frederick Knott under the title of Mr. Fox of Venice. Together, these three works formed the basis of Joseph L. Mankiewicz's 1967 film The Honey Pot.

== Plot introduction ==
As in Volpone a wealthy old man summons three old faces from his past to his villa in Venice promising to name one his heir. It departs from Jonson's work when one of his guests is murdered in the night, Fox's production abruptly switches genres from comedy to full-blown murder mystery.
