= Meyer R. Bimberg =

Seller of campaign buttons and theatre builder

Meyer R. Bimberg (died March 25, 1908) was a successful seller of campaign buttons and a theatre builder. Known as "Bim the Button Man" after the 1896 Republican National Convention, he made his fortune selling campaign buttons and built five theatres: West End Theatre (New York), the Yorkville Theatre in Harlem, New York, the Colonial Theatre (New York), the Astor Theatre and the Stuyvestant Theatre (which later became known as the Belasco Theatre). He was found dead in his bed at the Zenobia building after a bout of tonsillitis. The New York Times compared his theatre building, though short-lived, to Oscar Hammerstein I's.

A heavyset redhead, Bimberg used personal connections to help prognosticate the outcome of elections. His brother Edward Bimberg was the proprietor of the Palm Garden on 52nd Street after a career on the vaudeville stage.
