= Campaign button =

Election object worn as political advertising

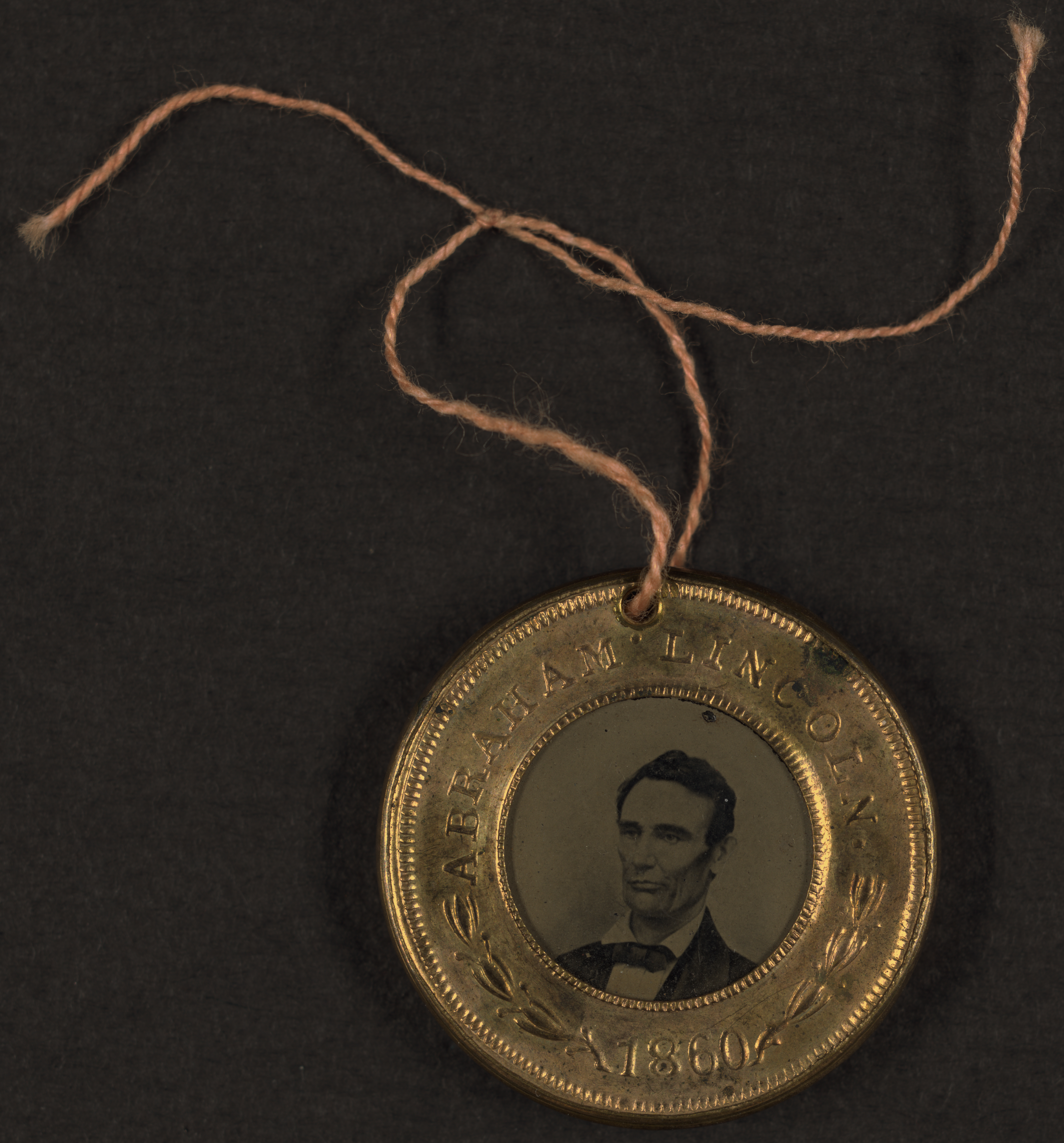
Presidential campaign button for Abraham Lincoln, 1860. The reverse side of the button shows a portrait of his running mate Hannibal Hamlin.

A campaign button is a pin used during an election as political advertising for (or against) a candidate or political party, or to proclaim the issues that are part of the political platform. In the United States, political buttons date as far back as President George Washington. They have taken many forms as the technology to create an image and mass production has allowed. In the late 18th and first half of the 19th century they were sewn-on clothing buttons, whereas the modern forms typically have pins on the back and are therefore also called pin-back buttons.

Campaign buttons bear some similarity to bumper stickers, which are also used for political and other promotional messages. As a novelty item, campaign buttons are part of the hobby of collecting.

== History ==
The first photographic image on pins dates to 1860. Abraham Lincoln and his various opponents used the tintype or ferrotype photo process.

The first mass production of metal buttons dates to the 1896 William McKinley campaign for president with "celluloid" buttons with one side of a metal disk covered with paper (printed with the message) and protected by a layer of clear plastic.

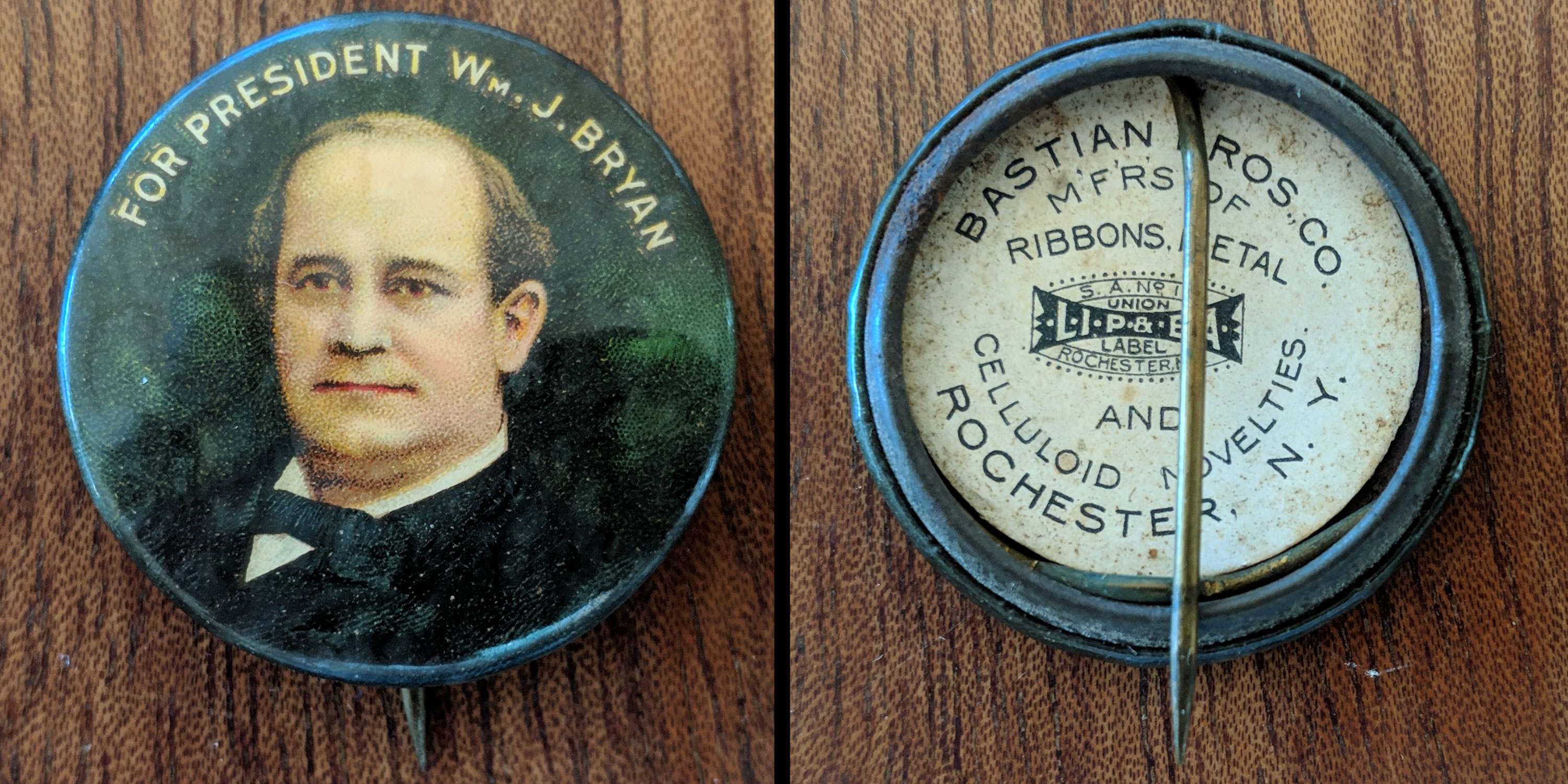
William Jennings Bryan presidential campaign button

Since 1916, buttons have also been produced by lithographing the image directly onto the metal disk. A celluloid-type button is fastened to a garment using a pin on the back side of the button (in recently produced buttons, the pin generally fits into a safety-pin-style catch). A lithographed button may fasten with a pinback or with a metal tab which folds over a lapel or pocket.

One of the most famous uses of campaign buttons occurred during the 1940 U.S. presidential election, when Wendell Willkie's campaign produced millions of lithographed slogan buttons in rapid response to news items about President Franklin D. Roosevelt.

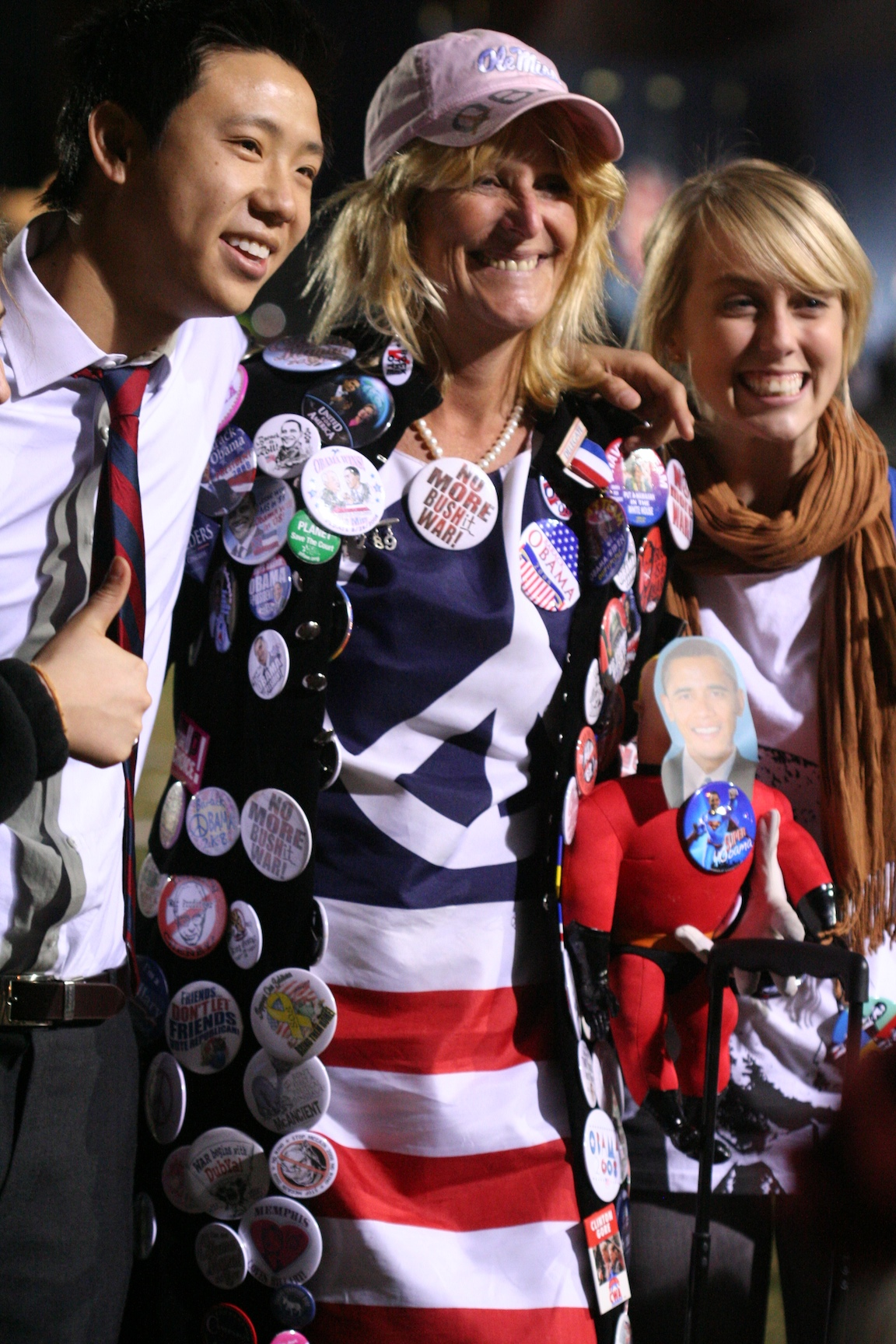
A Barack Obama supporter during the 2008 presidential election

Recently, increasing advertising expenses and legal limits on expenditures have led many U.S. campaigns to abandon buttons in favor of disposable lapel stickers, which are much less expensive.

Another recent trend is the use of graphical campaign buttons, or "web buttons", that Internet users can place on their personal websites. Graphical campaign buttons are useful because they can be widely distributed for little cost.

However, wider availability of machines for producing celluloid-type buttons (as well as inkjet and laser printers and design software) now permit even small campaigns to produce or acquire buttons relatively inexpensively, even in small quantities.

Campaign buttons are particularly popular in the United States. They are a less prominent in Canadian politics, and many Canadian campaign buttons are manufactured in the US.

== Collecting ==
Campaign button collecting exists as a hobby. The American Political Items Collectors is a non-profit membership organization, dedicated to promoting the collection, preservation and study of materials relating to political campaigns and the presidency. The most valuable example is believed to be a rare campaign button from the 1920 presidential election showing the likenesses of candidate James M. Cox and his running mate Franklin D. Roosevelt.

Librarians at Radcliffe College began collecting campaign buttons in the mid-19th century, starting with women's suffrage buttons. The Harvard Kennedy School library now holds a collection of thousands of buttons.

== See also ==
- Pin-back button
- "I Voted" sticker
- Meyer R. Bimberg
