= Detective Story (play) =

1949 play in three acts by Sidney Kingsley

Detective Story is a 1949 play in three acts by American playwright Sidney Kingsley. The play opened on Broadway at the Hudson Theatre on March 23, 1949, where it played until the production moved to the Broadhurst Theatre on July 3, 1950. The production closed on August 12, 1950, after 581 performances. The cast notably included Lydia Clarke who won a Theatre World Award for her performance.

Other cast members included Ralph Bellamy as Detective Jim McLeod, Meg Mundy as Mary McLeod, James Westerfield as Detective Lou Brody, Joan Copeland as Susan Carmichael, Harry Worth as Dr. Kurt Schneider, and Maureen Stapleton as Miss Hatch. The burglars were played by Joseph Wiseman and Michael Strong, who repeated their performance in the 1951 film version. Kingsley was awarded an Edgar from the Mystery Writers of America for Best Mystery Play. The play was selected as one of the best plays of 1948–1949, with an excerpted version published in "The Burns Mantle Best Plays of 1948-1949."

In April 1950 the play opened at London's Prince's Theatre. with George Margo, Ronan O'Casey and Douglass Montgomery.

In 1951, a short-lived production was staged at Harlem's Apollo Theater, with Sidney Poitier as Detective McLeod. A reviewer writing for Variety thought that Poitier lacked the maturity to play a grizzled detective and that the actor's goatee beard was "more suited to a be-bop musician than a gumshoe."

Another short-lived production was presented at the Ivar Theater and starred Allen Jenkins, Frank Fiumara, and Suzanne Alexander. It opened on June 4, 1951, and concluded the following month.

== Adaptations ==
Detective Story was presented on Broadway Playhouse January 7, 1953. The 30-minute adaptation starred Van Johnson. The play was adapted into a 1951 film of the same name.
