= The Honey Pot =

1967 film by Joseph L. Mankiewicz

- Theatrical release poster by Howard Terpning
- Directed by: Joseph L. Mankiewicz
- Screenplay by: Joseph L. Mankiewicz
- Based on: Mr. Fox of Venice by Frederick Knott; The Evil of the Day by Thomas Sterling; Volpone by Ben Jonson
- Produced by: Charles K. Feldman
- Starring: Rex Harrison; Susan Hayward; Cliff Robertson; Capucine; Edie Adams; Maggie Smith
- Cinematography: Gianni di Venanzo; Pasqualino De Santis (uncredited)
- Edited by: David Bretherton
- Music by: John Addison
- Production company: Famous Artists Productions
- Distributed by: United Artists
- Release dates: March 21, 1967 (United Kingdom); May 22, 1967 (United States)
- Running time: 150 minutes (UK); 132 minutes (US)
- Country: United States
- Language: English

The Honey Pot, also known as The Honeypot and It Comes Up Murder, is a 1967 American crime comedy-drama film written and directed by Joseph L. Mankiewicz. It stars Rex Harrison, Susan Hayward, Cliff Robertson, Capucine, Edie Adams, and Maggie Smith. The film was based on the play Mr. Fox of Venice by Frederick Knott, the novel The Evil of the Day by Thomas Sterling, and loosely on the 1606 play Volpone by Ben Jonson.

== Plot ==
Wealthy eccentric Cecil Fox hires struggling actor William McFly as his personal secretary to play a "practical joke". Pretending to be on his deathbed, Fox invites three former lovers to his Venetian palazzo for a final visit: penniless Princess Dominique, fading movie star Merle McGill, and Texas millionairess Lone Star Crockett Sheridan. Accompanying Mrs. Sheridan is her nurse, Sarah Watkins. Each of the three former lovers brings Fox a valuable timepiece as a present: Sheridan's, an elaborate porcelain antique; McGill's, a large quartz block with clock faces telling global time; and Dominique's, an heirloom hourglass reputedly filled with precious gold powder.

McFly soon recognizes that the premise of the "practical joke" is based on the plot of Ben Jonson's 17th Century theater classic Volpone, in which a swindler poses as a dying man to dupe three men who aspire to inherit his fortune, each bearing luxurious gifts. A former law student, McFly begins to suspect the motives behind the "practical joke" and to question how his role may incur legal liability.

The three former lovers warily size each other up. Sheridan boldly announces she is Fox's common-law wife, and the others can expect to inherit nothing. Sarah goes on a late-night date with McFly, during which McFly leaves her alone at a restaurant for over an hour ostensibly to make an important phone inquiry. On her return, Sarah finds Sheridan dead of an overdose of sleeping pills, an apparent suicide. However, Sarah knows that the pills Sheridan had been taking were placebos—harmless fakes. Police Inspector Rizzi investigates.

McFly reveals to Sarah that Fox is perpetrating a charade and the final joke was to be the reading of the will, empowering McFly to choose the heir. On searching McFly's room, Sarah finds several quarters from Sheridan’s missing roll of change. She suspects McFly of murdering Sheridan and plotting to kill Fox. When Sarah confronts McFly, he locks her in her room, telling her it is for her own safety. She manages to escape via a dumbwaiter to warn Fox, informing him that she has already confronted McFly. Fox's displeased reaction puzzles her. He sends her back to her room.

The next morning, Fox is found dead. Dominique, McGill, and Rizzi attend a reading of Fox's will, in which McFly is assigned as the executor with the power to fill in the blank left for the heir’s name. Divulging Fox's scheme based on Volpone, McFly reveals that Fox killed Sheridan. Fox had lost the quarters Sarah found in McFly's room to McFly during a poker game—Fox's greed couldn't resist taking petty change. Despite his fabulous but heavily mortgaged palazzo, Fox was broke. As Sheridan's common-law husband, Fox plotted to inherit her immense fortune. Once McFly had figured it out, informing Sarah, Fox realized he would be arrested for Sheridan’s murder and chose suicide.

As a final disdainful act, Fox had shattered the timepieces given to him by the three women. Dominique's hourglass is found empty of its gold dust. Taking out the centers of bonbons from a box of chocolates, and filling the bonbons with the gold dust, Fox swallowed the hourglass's entire contents. Rizzi asks why Fox would have done this, and McFly suddenly realizes that Fox has found a way to "take a fortune with him" after death. Dominique now announces that the contents of the hourglass—a mere facsimile of the original—was inexpensive pyrite, or "fool's gold." Fox's spirit, as a voice-over, expresses resentment that the princess has cheapened his parting gesture.

Sarah "whimsically" asks McFly to write her name down in the will as the heir of Fox's estate as a souvenir, with Rizzi signing as a witness. After McFly complies, an amused Rizzi compliments McFly on his generosity. Sheridan's estate is so vast that even after Fox's debts are paid, Sarah will still emerge an extremely wealthy woman. Sarah informs the indignant McFly that she will marry him and hand over the money once he resumes his law studies and becomes a lawyer. Fox's spirit now expresses admiration for "the Anglo-Saxon woman" for "the larceny" Sarah serendipitously has managed to pull off.

== Cast ==
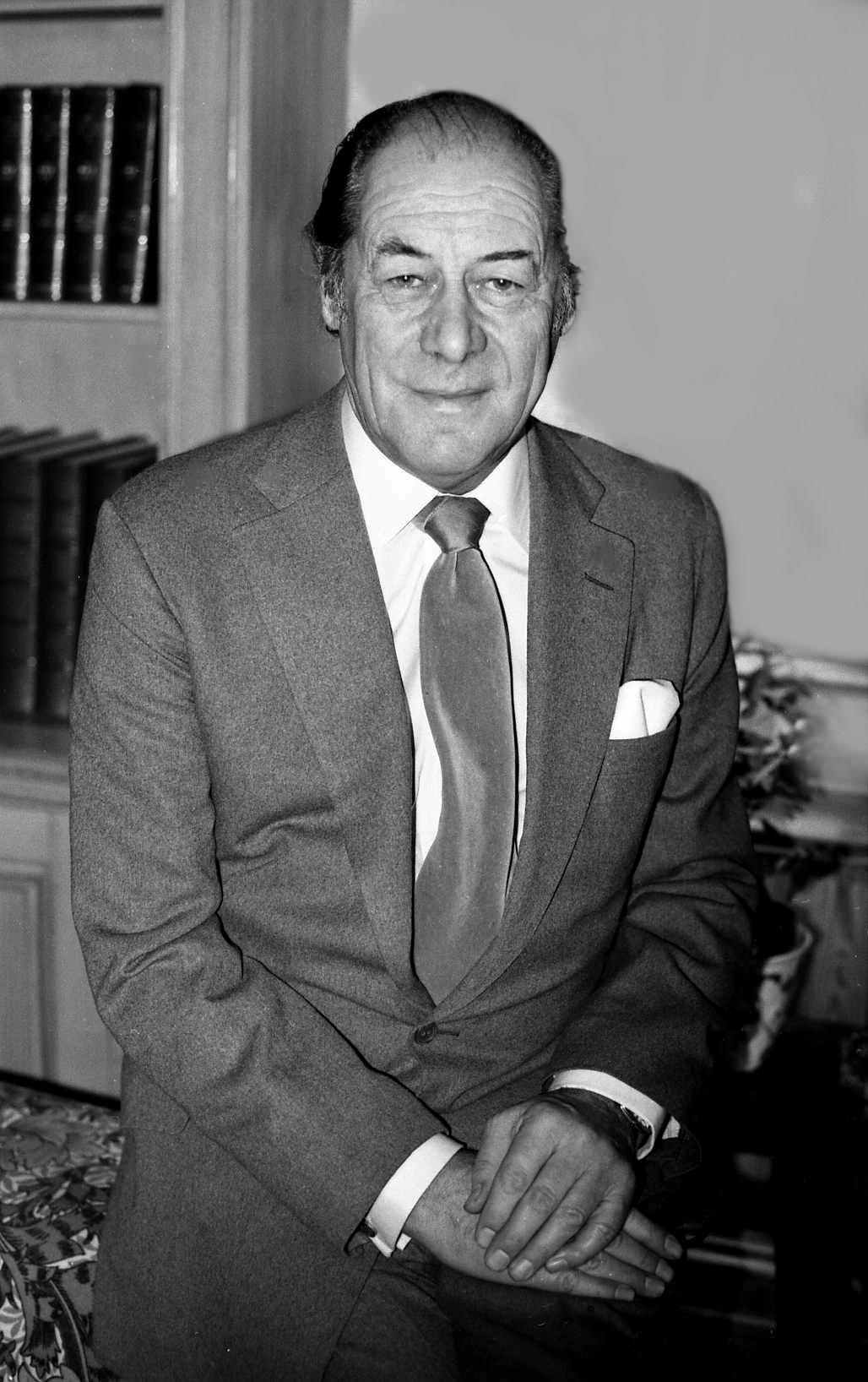
Rex Harrison plays Sheridan Fox

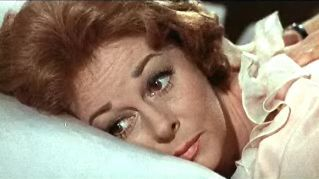
Susan Hayward as Mrs. Sheridan

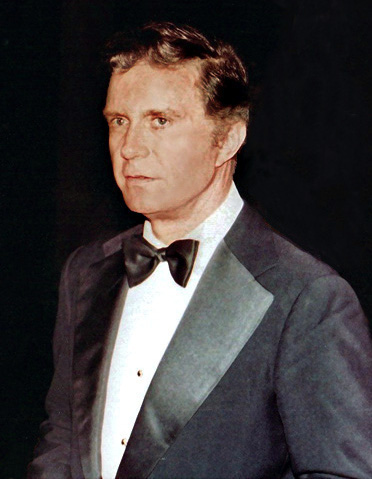
Cliff Robertson plays William McFly

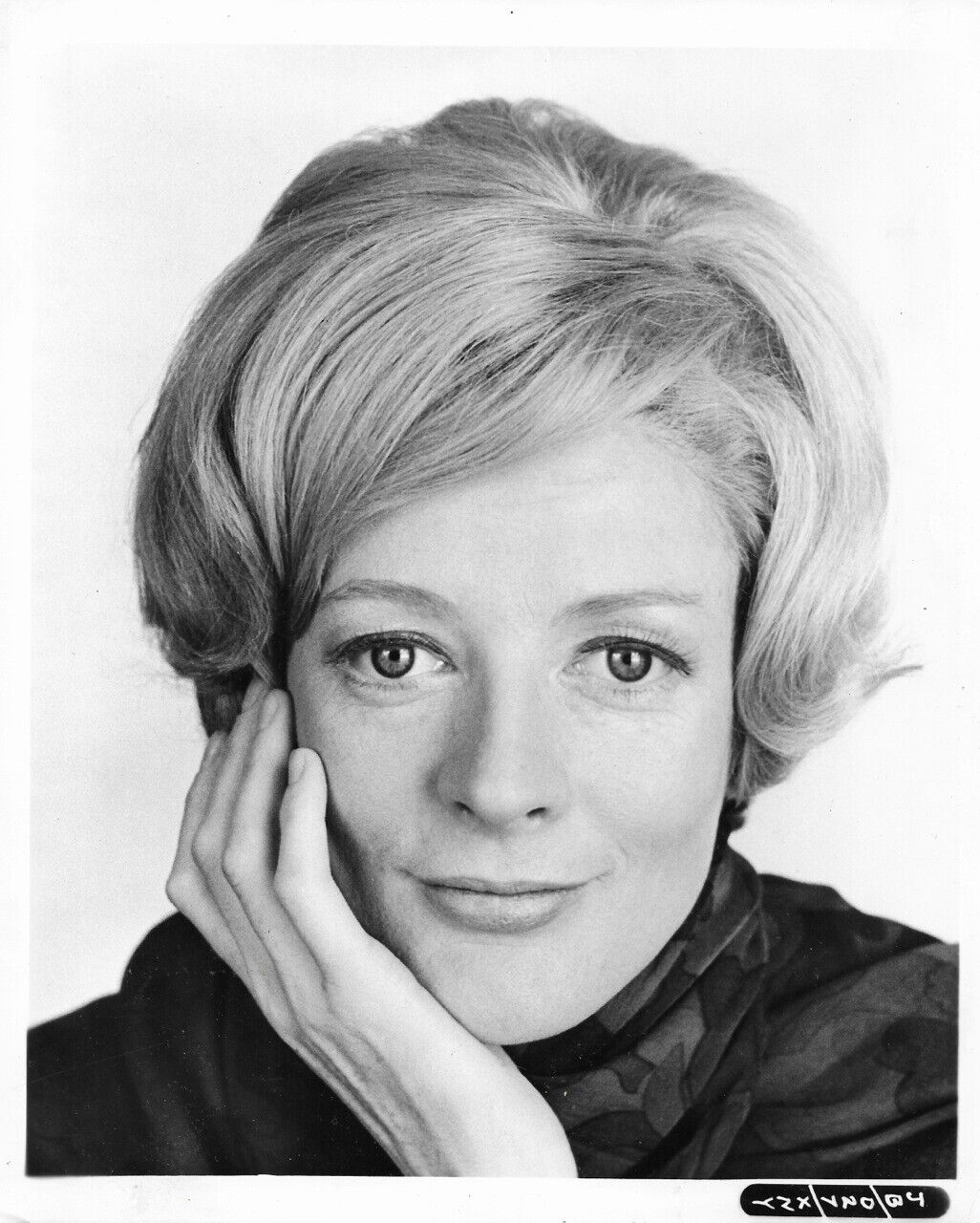
Maggie Smith plays Sarah Watkins

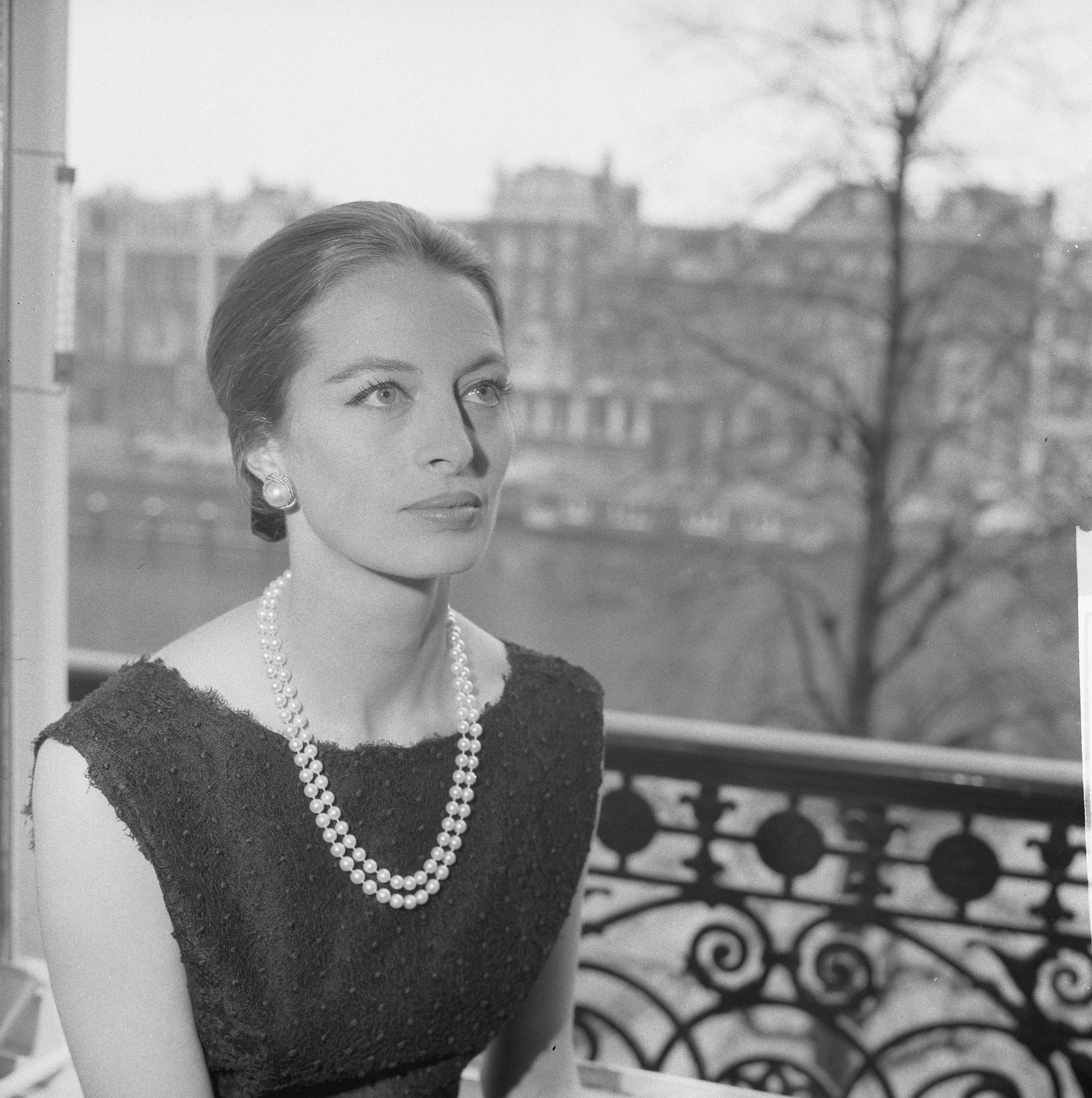
Capucine plays Princess Dominique

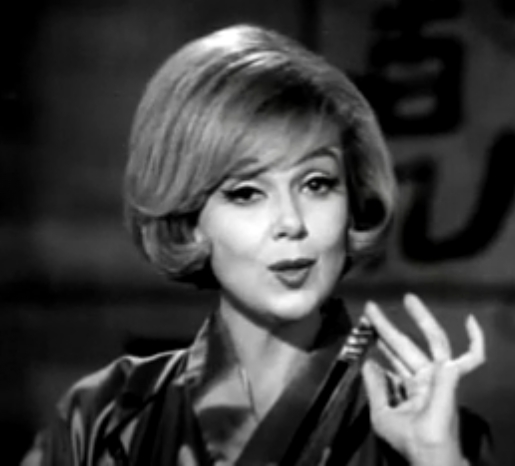
Edie Adams plays Merle McGill

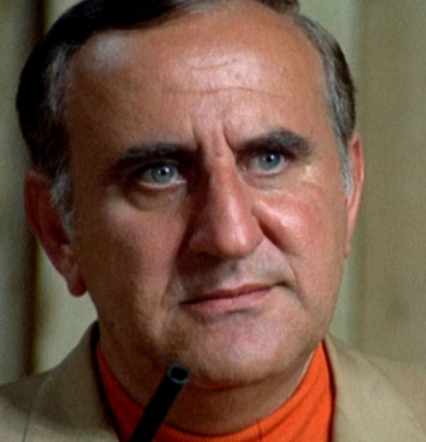
Adolfo Celi plays Inspector Rizzi

- Rex Harrison as Cecil Sheridan Fox
- Susan Hayward as Mrs. Lone Star Crockett Sheridan
- Cliff Robertson as William McFly
- Capucine as Princess Dominique
- Edie Adams as Merle McGill
- Maggie Smith as Sarah Watkins
- Adolfo Celi as Inspector Rizzi
- Hugh Manning as Volpone
- David Dodimead as Mosca

== Production ==
=== Development ===
In March 1964, The New York Times reported that Joseph L. Mankiewicz was developing a script adaptation of The Evil of the Day by Thomas Sterling, which itself was adapted from Ben Jonson's 1606 play Volpone. Mankiewicz's first draft, which was over 600 pages, interspersed the story with a framing device of dream sequences for each major character, which commented on various topics such as censorship and the nature of time.

In January 1965, Mankiewicz sent his drafts to United Artists (UA), Charles K. Feldman, and Doc Erickson, whom he wanted as production manager. Feldman and UA mutually agreed the framing device was too confusing. Mankiewicz relented and removed it from his next draft, though he retained the dream sequences for the three mistress characters.

=== Casting ===
In December 1964, Mankiewicz presented his first draft to Rex Harrison. Harrison recalled Mankiewicz "came to see me in New York with this enormous briefcase, a thousand-page manuscript inside. By the end of evening, I'd read it all and agreed to do it. Cecil Fox is a complex character. You must give him a little sympathy because he's a real devil." At one point, Harrison decided he wanted to play William McFly (which went to Cliff Robertson). Rather than accede to Harrison's demands, Mankiewicz looked at other potential candidates such as Christopher Plummer, Cary Grant, and Robert Redford for the role of Fox. After several months, Harrison stayed in his original role.

Harrison's wife Rachel Roberts had expressed interest in the role of Sarah Watkins, but Mankiewicz turned her down in favor of Maggie Smith, whose casting was announced in May 1965. Devastated at the rejection, Roberts attempted suicide by overdosing on barbiturates. During filming, Mankiewicz told the Los Angeles Times: "I'm hoping that it will do for Maggie Smith what All About Eve did for Marilyn Monroe and that it will do Susan Hayward what All About Eve did for Bette Davis."

Anne Bancroft was originally offered the role of Merle McGill, but she chose instead to star in Michael Cacoyannis' Broadway staging of John Whiting's The Devils. Instead, Edie Adams was cast. In May 1965, Capucine was cast in the film. During production, Susan Hayward was given permission to attend to her dying husband back in the United States.

=== Filming ===
Principal photography began on September 20, 1965, at Cinecittà in Rome under the new working title Anyone for Venice?. Certain scenes were filmed on location in Venice, including the Palazzo Soranzo Van Axel. After the first week of filming, Mankiewicz fired his cinematographer Piero Portalupi and replaced him with Gianni Di Venanzo. The New York Times reported Di Venanzo used diffused lighting that broke from the conventional lighting style used for comedies.

Di Venanzo died on February 3, 1966, from misdiagnosed hepatitis while the film was still in production, leaving the cast and crew desolated. Di Venanzo's assistant Pasqualino De Santis was hired as the third cinematographer for the remainder of filming. However, De Santis refused to take screen credit. Filming wrapped on February 26, 1966.

== Release ==
By May 1966, the film had been retitled to The Honey Pot. The film held its world premiere in London on March 21, 1967. After there were numerous complaints that the film was too long (at 150 minutes), Mankiewicz removed twenty minutes, including the dream sequences, when he returned to promote the film in the United States (where it was retitled It Comes Up Murder). It held its premiere in New York at the Trans-Lux West on Broadway and 49th Street, which was remodeled for more than $150,000 (nearly $1.5 million in 2026).

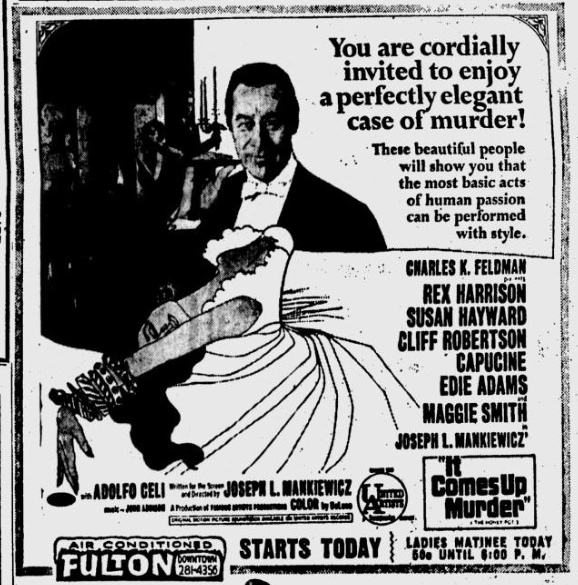
Pittsburgh Post-Gazette newspaper advertisement for the film, retitled It Comes Up Murder in the United States

=== Home media ===
The Honey Pot was released to DVD by MGM Home Entertainment on January 15, 2011, via its MGM MOD (manufacture-on-demand) service available through Amazon. It was also released on Blu-ray by Kino Lorber.

== Reception ==
Bosley Crowther of The New York Times concluded: "What might have been a brisk and brazen satire forms into a prolix and slow comedy mystery. However, Mr. Mankiewicz has made it with consummate style. His Venetian setting is excellent for the wicked business at hand, beautiful and ominous in color, and the performances are superb, even though it is difficult to fathom who and what these people are, Mr. Harrison has one genuinely charming and touching scene with Miss Smith toward the end, and the concluding twist is a cutie."

Robert Hawkins of Variety called The Honey Pot "a rich confection in every department". However, he felt the film's pace too slow and wondered whether "its hark-back to the days when the turn of phrase and the tongue-in-cheek were a staple" would weaken its appeal for contemporary audiences who preferred "Bondian brashness" to Mankiewicz's "innuendo." Roger Ebert of the Chicago Sun Times gave the film three stars out of four and wrote: "It is a conversational film, heavy on deduction and light on action, and it is very long (155 minutes). My first reaction was that it was too long, but on reflection I think perhaps the length is necessary ...But he [Mankiewicz] has played fair with the plot, and the plot has pulled him through. The leading actors are all competent, except for the wooden Cliff Robertson. Rex Harrison is splendid as a 17th Century nobleman trapped in the 20th Century."

Charles Champlin of the Los Angeles Times gave the film a mixed review, and wrote: "The Honey Pot (an unattractive title which unaccountably replaced a better one, Anyone for Venice?) is handsome to see, thanks largely to the great cinematographer, Gianni di Venanzo, who died during the making of the film. But it is also quite static, a series of very talky set-pieces. The trouble with this is that the verbal glitter which made Mankiewicz's All About Eve such a tart triumph here too often eludes him."

Boxoffice also criticized the film's length, but welcomed Mankiewicz's witty style, calling The Honey Pot "one of the most sophisticated and stylish pictures to come along in several seasons...Welcome back, Mr. Mankiewicz!" British film critic Graham Clarke gave the film a favorable review in the Kinematograph Weekly, writing: "It is so full of cunningly contrived intricacies, of cynical, witty and serious dialogue and of boldly presented renaissance flamboyance."

Penelope Houston of The Spectator felt "The Honey Pot which ought to be free and easy and cynically elegant, somehow emerges as slightly strained and broken-backed ...Still, bits of the dialogue between the neglected ladies have the old Mankiewicz rasp, the plot twists pass the time, and when Rex Harrison and Maggie Smith take over, the playing leaps to Wimbledon finalist standard." Filmink called it one of Mankiewicz's worst films.

On the review aggregator website Rotten Tomatoes, 57% of critics' reviews are positive, with an average rating of 6/10.

== See also ==
- List of American films of 1967

== Bibliography ==
- Geist, Kenneth L. (1978). Pictures Will Talk: The Life and Films of Joseph L. Mankiewicz. New York: Scribners. ISBN 0-684-15500-1.
- Stern, Sydney Ladensohn (2019). The Brothers Mankiewicz: Hope, Heartbreak, and Hollywood Classics. University Press of Mississippi. ISBN 978-1-617-03267-7.
