= Write Me a Murder =

1961 mystery play by Frederick Knott

- Original language: English
- Written by: Frederick Knott

Premiere
- Date: 26 October 1961
- Place: Belasco Theatre, New York City

Write Me a Murder is a mystery play in three acts by Frederick Knott, which premiered on Broadway at the Belasco Theatre on October 26, 1961, presented by the Compass Productions, Inc., directed by George Schaefer, stage design by Warren Clymer, costume design by Noel Taylor. It ran for 196 performances, closing on April 14, 1962 at the Belasco Theatre.

== Plot ==
The play tells the story of the brothers Clive and David Rodingham, who inherit the family fortune upon the death of their father. They then meet business man Charles and his wife Julie, a would-be thriller writer. Charles is anxious to work with the brothers on property deals, and so encourages David, who is also a writer, to co-write a murder story with Julie. It isn’t long before the two concoct the perfect crime, which twisted into a reality.

== Original production ==
Write Me a Murder opened at the Belasco Theater on October 24, 1961, and it ran for 196 performances.

== Original cast ==
- James Donald as The Hon. David Rodingham
- Denholm Elliott as The Hon. Clive Rodingham
- Kim Hunter as Julie Sturrock
- Ethel Griffies as Dr. Elizabeth Woolley
- Torin Thatcher as Charles Sturrock
- Robert Milli as Mr. Tibbit
- Herbert Voland as Constable Hackett

== Awards ==
Knott was awarded an Edgar Allan Poe Award for Best Play from the Mystery Writers of America. He had won an earlier Edgar Award in this same category for Dial M for Murder.
