= Dial M for Murder (Sunday Night Theatre) =

1952 British TV crime drama

- Sunday Night Theatre episode
- Based on: Dial M for Murder by Frederick Knott
- Original air date: 23 March 1952

"Dial M for Murder" was a British TV crime drama, episode 12 of the third season of the series Sunday Night Theatre. It was aired on 23 March 1952.

The script was based on the eponymous play by Frederick Knott, which later was adapted as a film by Alfred Hitchcock in 1954.

== Cast ==
- Elizabeth Sellars as Sheila Wendice
- Basil Appleby as Max Halliday
- Emrys Jones as Tony Wendice
- Olaf Pooley as Captain Lesgate
- Douglas Stewart as Lionel
- Raymond Huntley as Inspector Hubbard
- Robert Cawdron as Police Sergeant
- Fletcher Lightfoot
- Lane Meddick
- Graham Stuart
- Adrian Wallet
