= Lucrece (play) =

Lucrece is a play in six scenes by Thornton Wilder with incidental music by Deems Taylor. Wilder adapted André Obey's French play Le Viol De Lucrece into English, and Taylor composed the shows music. Obey's play was in turn based on William Shakespeare's poem The Rape of Lucrece about the Roman noblewoman Lucretia. Katharine Cornell and her husband Guthrie McClintic produced the work. It premiered at the Hanna Theatre in Cleveland, Ohio on November 29, 1932. It then played at the Teck Theatre in Buffalo before transferring to Broadway where it opened at the Belasco Theatre on December 20, 1932. Katharine Cornell portrayed the title role, and Robert Loraine and Blanche Yurka portrayed narrators reminiscent of a Greek chorus. Others in the cast included Brian Aherne as Tarquin, Charles Waldron as Brutus, Joyce Carey as Emilia, Pedro de Cordoba as Collatine, Brenda Forbes as Marina, and George Macready as both Valerius and a soldier.
