= Belasco Theatre =

Broadway theater in Manhattan, New York

- Stuyvesant Theatre
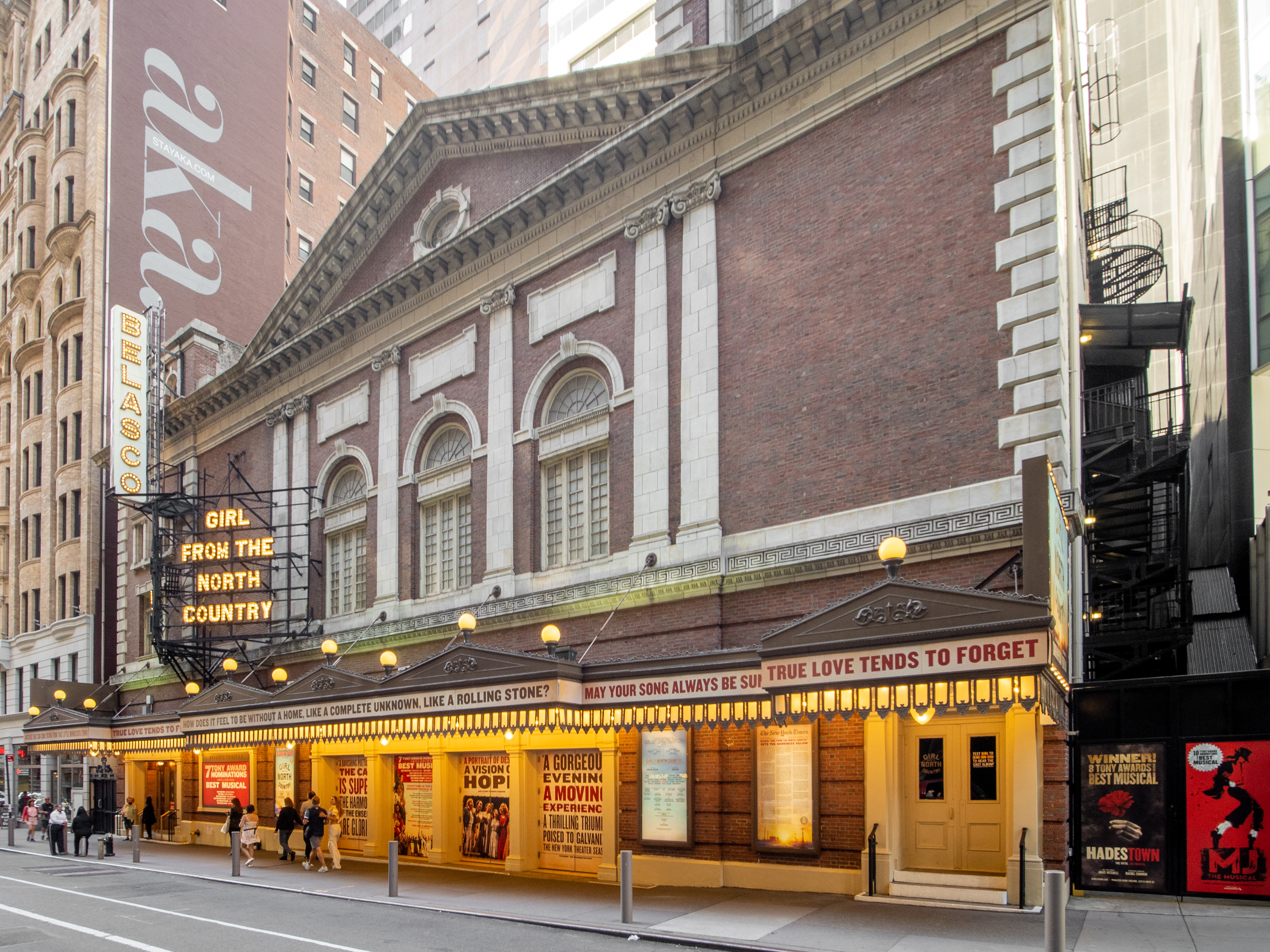
- Seen in 2022
- Interactive map of Belasco Theatre
- Address: 111 West 44th Street; Manhattan, New York; United States
- Coordinates: 40°45′24″N 73°59′02″W
- Owner: The Shubert Organization
- Capacity: 1,016
- Type: Broadway
- Production: Maybe Happy Ending

Construction
- Opened: October 16, 1907 (118 years ago)
- Architect: George Keister

Website
- shubert.nyc/theatres/belasco/

New York City Landmark
- Designated: November 4, 1987
- Reference no.: 1317
- Designated entity: Facade

New York City Landmark
- Designated: November 4, 1987
- Reference no.: 1318
- Designated entity: Lobby and auditorium interior

The Belasco Theatre is a Broadway theater at 111 West 44th Street, between Seventh Avenue and Sixth Avenue, in the Theater District of Midtown Manhattan in New York City, New York, U.S. Originally known as the Stuyvesant Theatre, it was built in 1907 and designed by architect George Keister for impresario David Belasco. The Belasco Theatre has 1,016 seats across three levels and has been operated by The Shubert Organization since 1948. Both the facade and interior of the theater are New York City landmarks.

The main facade on 44th Street is made of red brick in Flemish bond, with terracotta decorative elements. The ground floor contains the entrance, while the upper stories are asymmetrical and topped by a pediment. Belasco and his company had their offices in the western wing of the theater. A ten-room duplex penthouse apartment occupies the top of the eastern wing and contained Belasco's collection of memorabilia. The interior features Tiffany lighting and ceiling panels, rich woodwork, and expansive murals by American artist Everett Shinn. The auditorium consists of a ground-level orchestra and two overhanging balconies, with boxes at the second balcony level.

The theater was developed by Meyer R. Bimberg and operated by David Belasco as the Stuyvesant Theatre. It opened on October 16, 1907, and was expanded in 1909 with Belasco's apartment. Belasco renamed the venue for himself in 1910. After his death in 1931, Katharine Cornell and then the wife of playwright Elmer Rice leased the space. The Shuberts bought the theater in 1948 and leased it to NBC for three years before returning it to legitimate use in 1953. Through the late 20th century, despite a decline in the quality of productions hosted at the Belasco, it continued to show Broadway plays and musicals. The theater was renovated multiple times over the years, including in the 1920s, 1970s, and 2000s.

== Site ==
The Belasco Theatre is on 111 West 44th Street, on the north sidewalk between Seventh Avenue and Sixth Avenue, near Times Square in the Theater District of Midtown Manhattan in New York City, New York, U.S. The rectangular land lot covers 12,552 ft^{2} (1,166.1 m^{2}), with a frontage of 125 ft (38 m) on 44th Street and a depth of about 100 ft (30 m). On the same block, the Hotel Gerard, Hudson Theatre, and Millennium Times Square New York are to the west. Other nearby buildings include the Algonquin Hotel to the east, 1166 Avenue of the Americas to the northeast, the Americas Tower and High School of Performing Arts to the north, the Lyceum Theatre and 1540 Broadway to the northwest, 1500 Broadway to the southwest, and the Chatwal New York hotel and the Town Hall to the south.

== Design ==
The Belasco Theatre was designed by George Keister, the architect of the neighboring Hotel Gerard, in the neo-Georgian style. It was constructed from 1906 to 1907 as the Stuyvesant Theatre and was originally operated by David Belasco. The neo-Georgian style was selected because a similar style was used on many early government buildings of New York City. The original name was a homage to Peter Stuyvesant, a director-general of New Amsterdam, the 17th-century Dutch colony that later became New York City. Compared to its contemporaries, the Belasco is relatively small. A wing for offices and dressing rooms, separated from the rest of the theater by a thick wall, was constructed on the west side of the theater. The eastern part of the theater is topped by a private duplex apartment built in 1909.

=== Facade ===
The primary elevation of the facade faces south on 44th Street and is made of red brick in Flemish bond, with terracotta decorative elements. It is split into an office section to the west and the main theater section to the east. The side walls are faced in plain brick. The 44th Street elevation is about 60 ft (18 m) tall, while the rear elevation is cited as being 80 ft (24 m) or 90 ft (27 m) tall. To comply with fire regulations at the time of the Belasco's construction, the theater is surrounded by an alley measuring 10 ft (3.0 m) wide. Due to the presence of the alley, the theater only measures 105 by 100 ft (32 by 30 m).

==== Ground story ====
On 44th Street, the ground-story facade consists of a water table made of granite, above which is burnt brick in Flemish bond. There are four pairs of doors at the center of the facade, above which is an entablature made of terracotta. These doors are separated by terracotta pilasters in the Tuscan style. On either side of the central doorways are wood-framed display boards.

The facade's westernmost portion corresponds to the office stories and has a granite stoop with two steps. The steps are flanked by iron railings and lead to two pairs of wood-and-glass doors, which connect to the ticket lobby. These doorways are set within the same opening, with Doric terracotta pilasters on either side and an entablature above. A metal gate leads to an alley on the west. The easternmost section contains a stoop with three steps, which lead to a pair of wood-and-glass doors flanked by pilasters; this provides access to the balcony. A large metal canopy hangs above the doorways. An egg-and-dart molding and a Greek key frieze runs above the ground story on 44th Street.

==== Upper stories ====
Details of the 44th Street elevation

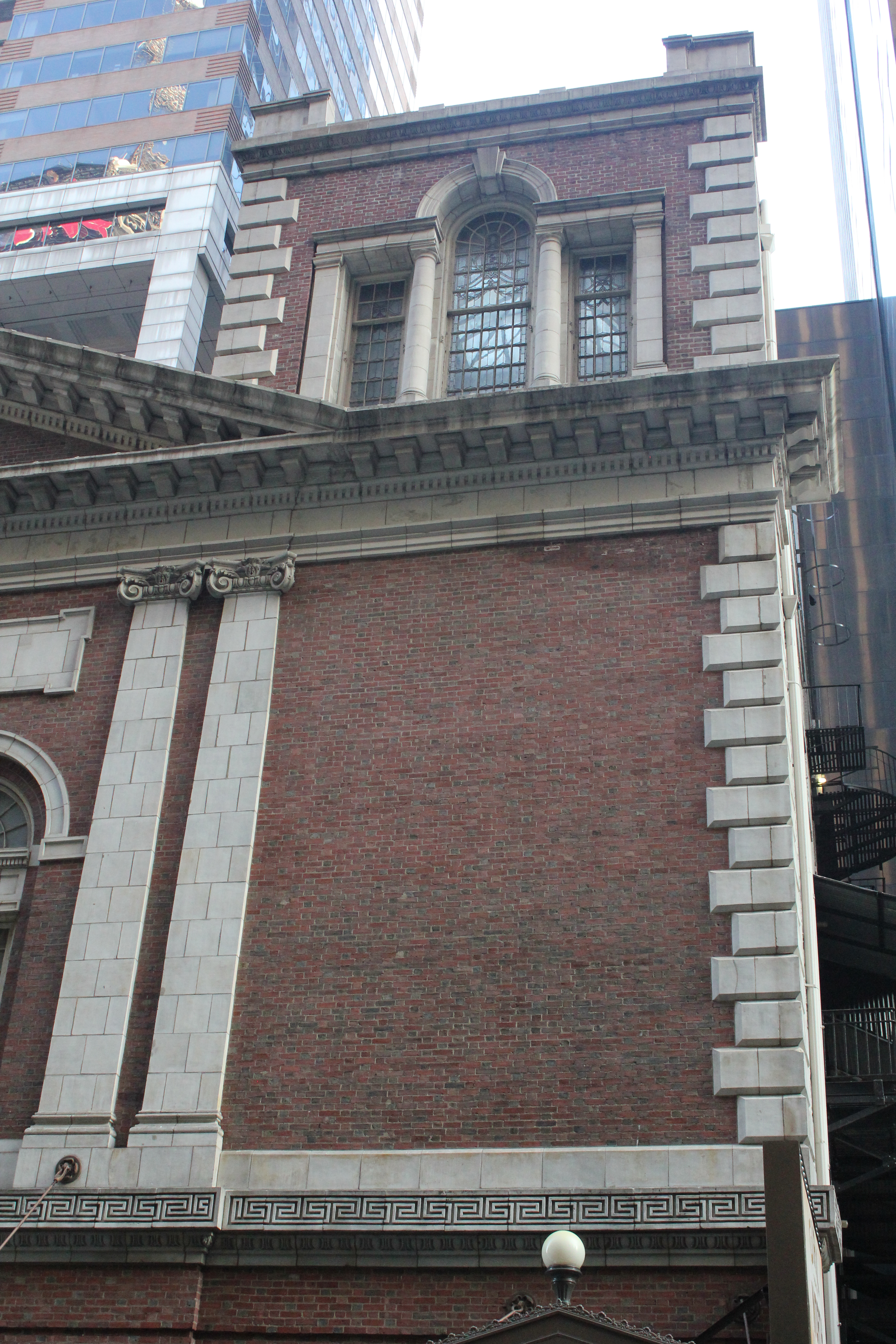
East end pavilion

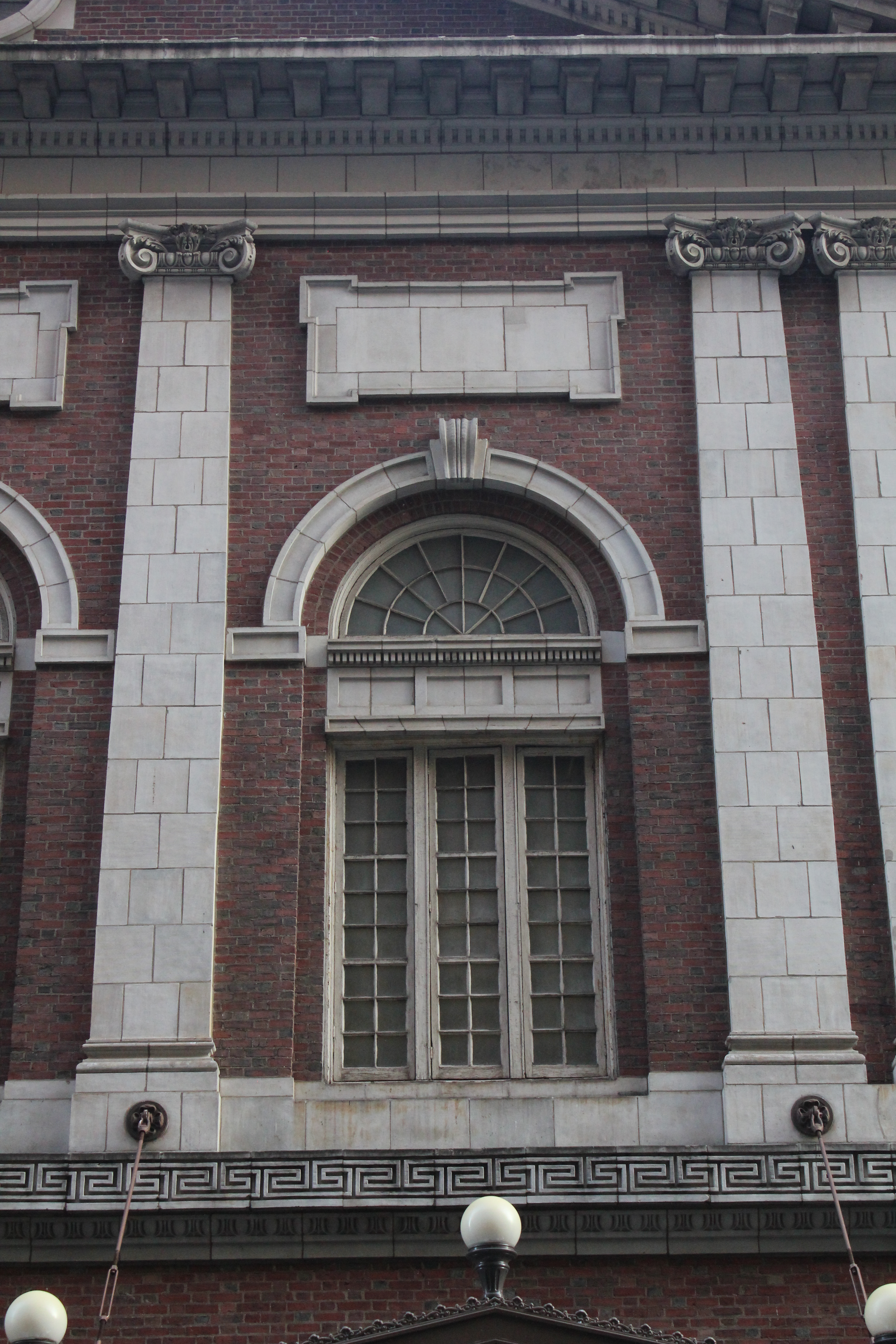
One of the center bays

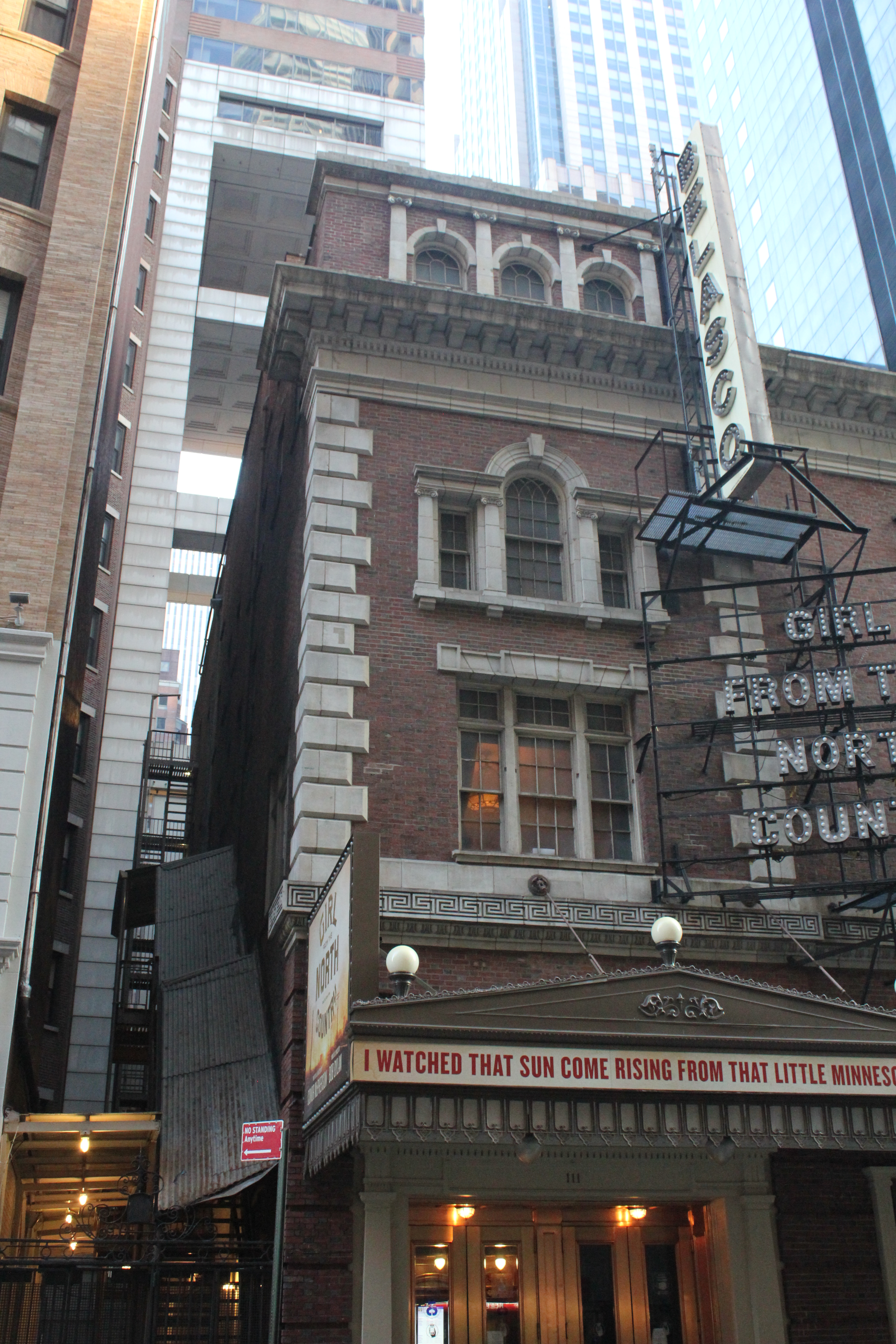
The office section at far west

The upper stories are asymmetrical. The office section of the theater is at the extreme western end of the facade, while a pair of pavilions flanks three vertical bays on the rest of the facade. The entire third story is topped by an entablature with a molded frieze, a set of dentils, and a heavy cornice with modillions. The cornice wraps around to the side elevations of the facade.

The pavilions are made of burnt brick and generally lack windows. A metal sign assembly hangs in front of the west pavilion. The eastern corner of the east pavilion has a terracotta quoin. Belasco's apartment is on the fourth story above the eastern pavilion. On 44th Street, the apartment has quoins at either corner, a brick facade, and a Palladian window. Engaged columns and terracotta pilasters flank the center portion of the Palladian window, while multi-paned windows form the side portions of the window. An egg-and-dart molding runs above the apartment facade.

The three center bays are delineated by a pair of Ionic terracotta pilasters at each end, as well as two single pilasters in the center. At the second story, each of the center bays contains tripartite casement windows. Above the windows are terracotta lintels, which are separated into three panels and are topped by a course of dentils. At the third story, each center bay has a round-arched window, surrounded by paneled terracotta blocks and topped by a keystone. A rectangular terracotta panel with eared corners is placed above each window. Above the cornice, a brick triangular pediment rises over the center three bays. There is an oval window at the center of the pediment, with a terracotta frame and keystones, as well as a cornice with modillions above the pediment.

The westernmost portion of the 44th Street elevation is the office section, which is designed in a similar style as the main theater facade, though it is distinctly demarcated from the rest of the facade. which is flanked on either side by terracotta quoins. The second story of the office section has a tripartite window with a terracotta lintel. The third story of the offices contains a Palladian window, which consists of an arched window flanked by rectangular windows on each side. The Palladian window has Ionic terracotta pilasters and a terracotta keystone above the arch. Above the entablature, the fourth story of the office section has quoins at either corner. There are three arched windows at the fourth story, surrounded by terracotta frames and topped by terracotta keystones. The windows are separated by Ionic pilasters, supporting a frieze and egg-and-dart molding of the same material.

=== Interior ===
The interior color scheme was devised largely by Wilfred Buckland, who worked for Belasco's studios. Everett Shinn designed murals for the theater. The Belasco was outfitted with the most advanced stagecraft tools available including extensive lighting rigs, a hydraulics system, and vast wing and fly space. Like the neighboring Lyceum Theatre, it was built with ample workshop space underneath the stage. Tiffany Studio designed lighting fixtures throughout the theater, which were executed by theatrical-lighting specialists Nimis & Nimis. Nineteen emergency exits lead from the auditorium onto the street or the alley, including ten from orchestra level. According to news reports published when the theater opened, the entire theater could be evacuated in three minutes. The Belasco's color scheme consisted largely of blue, green, and brown hues.

The theater was also mechanically advanced for its time, with heating, cooling, and ventilating systems. There were no radiators in the theater, but the floor contained a plenum system with 350 ducts. The plenum system used to evenly distribute the heat from two boilers, either of which could heat the theater on its own. When a sufficient level of heat had been reached, the heat was shut off and fresh air was distributed through the plenum system, using large blowers. Air outflow passed through hidden openings in the ceiling of the auditorium. In addition, the cellar contained a fire pump capable of 250 U.S. gal (950 L; 210 imp gal) per minute, supplied by a 15,000 U.S. gal (57,000 L; 12,000 imp gal) water tower on the roof and a 10,000 U.S. gal (38,000 L; 8,300 imp gal) reserve tank in the basement. Below the stage was a mezzanine with heating coils. Each side of the theater had three separate sets of fire escapes, and the western side had a marble-and-stone staircase leading directly into the alley there. The additional exits were constructed to prevent crowd crushes, such as happened in the 1876 Brooklyn Theatre fire, where hundreds had died.

==== Lobby ====
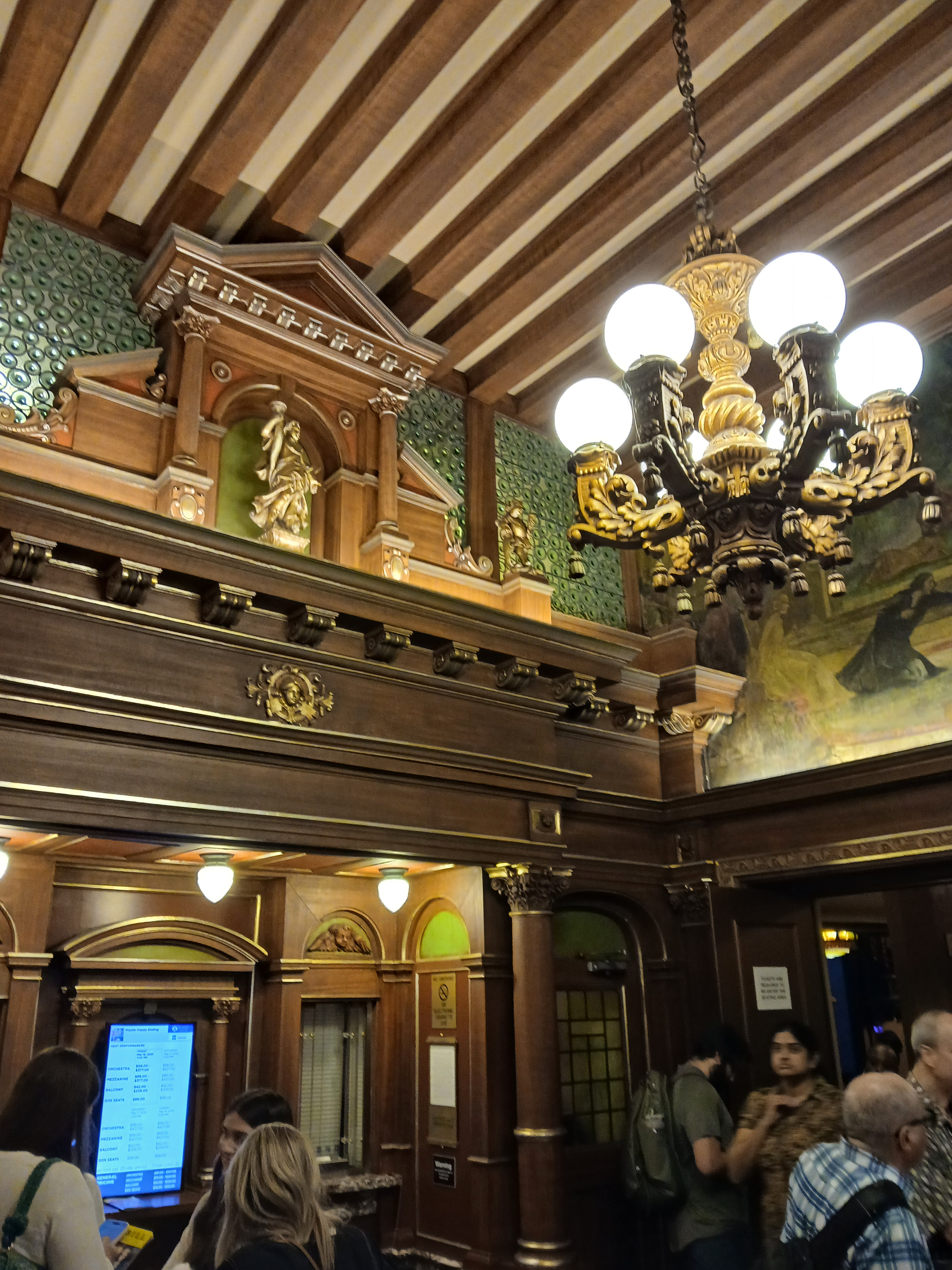
Box office

The entrance lobby is a nearly square space, accessed from the westernmost entrance on 44th Street. John Rapp designed the lobby. It originally was decorated in a walnut-brown and gold color scheme, but this was changed to black and gold sometime in the 20th century. The floor is made of mosaic tiles and terrazzo. The walls of the lobby are wainscoted in Rouge Duranche marble, with paneling and Corinthian pilasters above the wainscoting. Partway up the wall is an entablature around the entire room, which contains a cornice with modillions. The wall surfaces above the entablature are designed to resemble leather. The side-wall panels have gilded sconces, and the ceiling has a chandelier suspended from it.

The main entrance is from the south wall, above which are murals by Everett Shinn. The east wall contains doors to the auditorium. At the center of the north wall, directly opposite the entrance doors, is an ornate box office within an arched opening. The main ticket window is flanked by Corinthian-style colonnettes on either side, which support an arched pediment; there are also arched panels to the left and right of the ticket window. In addition, there are Corinthian columns placed on marble bases on either side of the box office opening. Above the opening is the cornice and a carved aedicule with a pediment and a brass figure. A brass standing rail originally was placed in front of the ticket window but was removed.

==== Auditorium ====
The auditorium has a ground-level orchestra, boxes, two balconies, promenades on the three seating levels, and a large stage behind the proscenium arch. The auditorium's width is greater than its depth. The auditorium has 1,016 seats. (Note: This has also been cited as 1,015 seats. According to one source, the seating capacity ranges from 990 to 1,042 depending on layout.) These are divided into 527 seats at orchestra level, 283 on the first balcony, and 200 on the second balcony, as well as 24 box seats and 25 standing-only spots. (Note: As built, these were divided into about 450 seats at orchestra level, 320 on the first balcony, and 240 on the second balcony.) The orchestra was designed with 15 rows of seats. There were also twelve boxes in total. The seats were all made by the American Seating Company. Each seat was of heavy wood, upholstered in dark brown leather, and the back of each chair was embossed with an emblem of a bee.

===== Seating areas =====
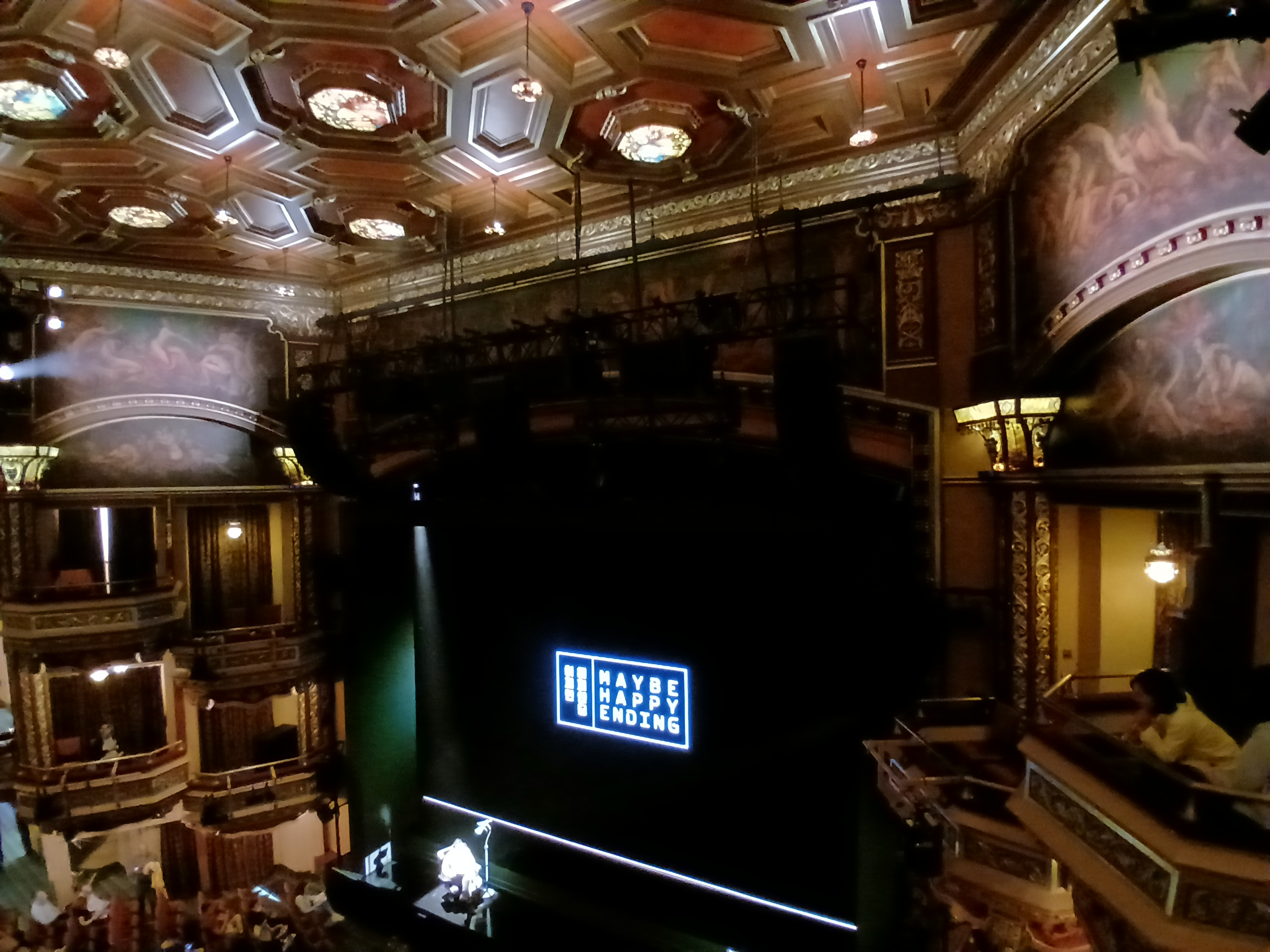
Auditorium as seen from balcony level

The auditorium is accessed from the ticket lobby at the southwest corner of the orchestra. The rear (south) end of the orchestra contains four octagonal columns containing capitals of stained glass, which hold up the first balcony level, and emergency exit doors on the east wall. The columns are placed behind the last row of seats. Other than those columns, the two balcony levels are cantilevered, allowing all rows an unobstructed view of the stage. Four pairs of exit doors on the rear wall of the orchestra lead directly to the central doors on the sidewalk. There are gilded wall sconces next to and between two sets of the doors on the rear wall.

The orchestra has a raked floor and painted wood paneling on the side walls. Four boxes, each with six seats, flanked the stage at the orchestra level, though these have since been removed. Staircases on either side of the rear doors connect the orchestra to the first balcony level. The orchestra level is wheelchair-accessible via the side doors, but the balcony levels can only be accessed by steps. The balcony levels have wainscoting on both the side and rear walls, as well as gilded wall sconces on the side walls. The balconies have paneled bands on their undersides, with light fixtures underneath. Small stained-glass chandeliers hang over the second balcony. In front of the balconies are bosses topped by foliate bands. Until 2010, the second balcony was accessed by a different entrance from the other seats. This arrangement was a vestige of an operation in which theater patrons were separated into two classes, an arrangement more common in West End theatre than Broadway theatre.

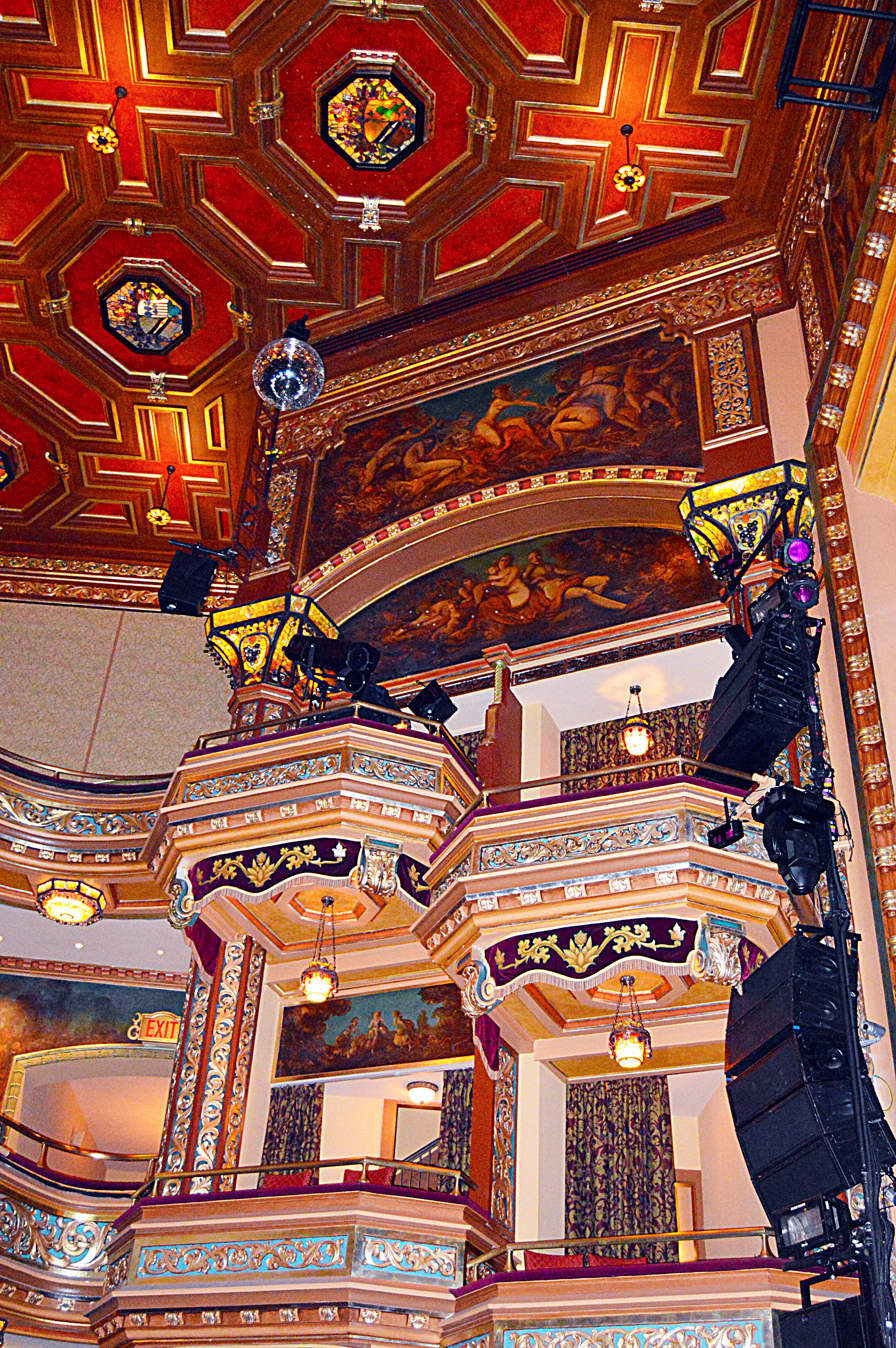
Left-hand boxes in the Belasco

On either side of the stage is a wall section, which originally contained two boxes on either balcony level. The first balcony boxes had been removed before the 1980s, but they were restored in 2010. The boxes are supported on console brackets and contain angled railings with foliate decoration; a colonnette separates each pair of boxes. The boxes' wall sections are flanked by octagonal columns with capitals of stained glass, which support an arch with a molding. At the tops of the boxes' wall sections are murals depicting love. A staircase connects the orchestra level to the boxes on the east wall.

===== Other design features =====
Next to the boxes is the proscenium arch, which consists of a wide band surrounded by foliate patterns, as well as a molding with brackets. The proscenium is small in comparison to other Broadway theaters, measuring about 32 ft (9.8 m) high and 30 ft (9.1 m) wide. There is a mural within the arch, measuring 35 ft (11 m) long by 8 ft (2.4 m) tall, except at the center where the mural is only 6 ft (1.8 m) tall. The mural has 29 pairs of figures, which depict emotions such as music, grief, tranquility, allurement, blind love, and poetry. Directly in front of the stage was an orchestra pit measuring 32 feet across and 7 ft (2.1 m) deep.

The stage itself originally measured 80 ft (24 m) wide and 27 ft (8.2 m) deep. In the 1910s, an adjustable apron measuring 5 ft (1.5 m) wide was built in front of the curtain, which could be used to widen the stage to 85 ft (26 m). A gridiron was placed 76 ft (23 m) above the stage, while the fly galleries were on either side of the stage and 30 ft (9.1 m) above it. At the center of the stage is an elevator trap measuring about 10 ft (3.0 m) deep and either 20 ft (6.1 m) or 18 ft (5.5 m) wide. The trap could raise or lower an entire set to either of two basement levels below the stage. The lower basement level is 30 ft (9.1 m) or 32 feet deep. A platform with the preceding scene's props, built similarly to a large wagon, could be loaded onto the trap, then swapped in the basement with another platform loaded with the next scene's props. Some 4,500 electric lights were distributed in the stage area. The footlights on the stage were arranged in seven sections. There were five sets of "border lights", with 270 lamps in each, as well as 88 sockets in the fly galleries. The switchboard had 65 or 75 dimmers.

There is a large gilded-and-glass chandelier hanging from the auditorium's main ceiling. The ceiling was designed with 22 stained-glass panels, each depicting two shields and being illuminated from above. Twenty of these panels depicted Shakespeare in the dexter (right) position and various dramatists in the sinister (left) position. Each of these panels depicted a different dramatist, for a total of 21 people. The arms of Stuyvesant and Goethe were depicted in the shield to the left of the stage, while the arms of Greece and Shakespeare were depicted in those to the right. Concealed behind the stained-glass panels are 500 lamps. This illumination was meant to give an impression of "real daylight". George Keister designed the dome lighting.

==== Other facilities ====
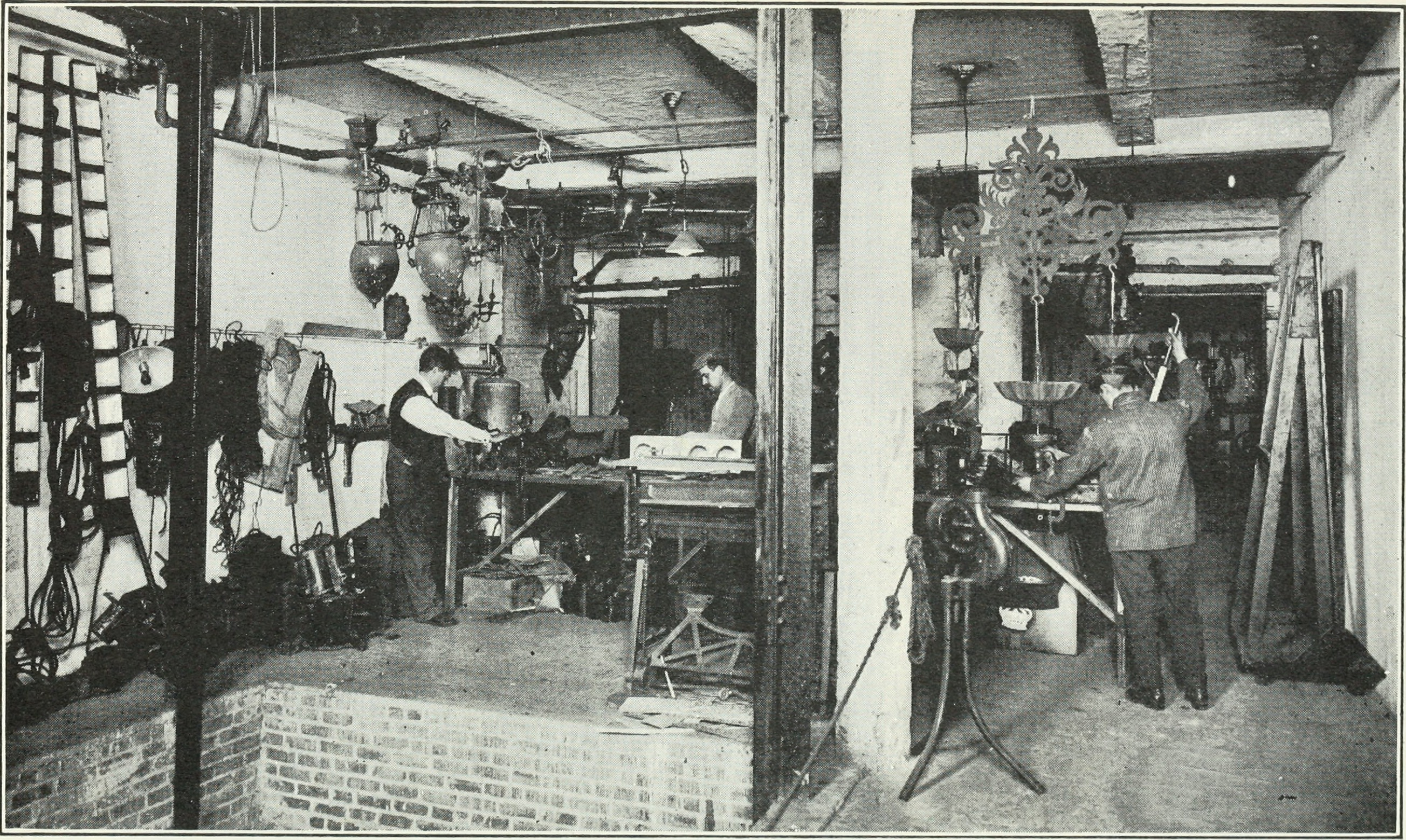
Backstage

David Belasco intended the backstage areas to be clean and comfortable, even prohibiting stagehands from spitting onto the floor. There were chairs behind the stage for actors to rest, as well as padded floors behind the proscenium so actors could walk on and off stage without making noise. Adjoining the auditorium was a six-story wing for dressing rooms. Each of the dressing rooms were arranged similarly to contemporary residential apartments, with concrete floors natural light, ventilation, hot and cold water, and a shower and bathtub on each floor. There were thirty-five rooms in total. The dressing rooms overlooked the side and rear alleys for natural light exposure, and the eastern wall was a thick fireproof wall separating the dressing rooms from the rest of the theater.

The eastern portion of the theater contains a ten-room duplex apartment, which was built for Belasco in 1909. The apartment's design complements the fourth story of the office wing to the west. The unit had its own small private elevator, as well as a living room with a 30-foot ceiling. The duplex contained eccentric items including a collection of ancient pieces of glass; a room containing Napoleon memorabilia, such as a strand of Napoleon's hair; and a bedroom designed with Japanese furnishings. Also in the duplex were a dining room, a library leading to a dining room, large baths, and narrow passages. Belasco had a collection of erotica and medieval art in a hidden Gothic-style room. Scattered across the duplex were banners, rugs, books, and what one biographer called "a vast, confusing medley of collectors' treasures". After Belasco died in 1931, Sardi's restaurant received some artifacts for its "Belasco Room". Some books went to the New York Public Library, but most objects were auctioned off. The Shubert Organization removed some decorations in the 1980s, and air ducts were subsequently installed in the apartment.

== History ==
Times Square became the epicenter for large-scale theater productions between 1900 and the Great Depression. Manhattan's theater district had begun to shift from Union Square and Madison Square during the first decade of the 20th century. From 1901 to 1920, forty-three theaters were built around Broadway in Midtown Manhattan, including the Belasco Theatre. David Belasco himself had been involved in operating Oscar Hammerstein's Republic Theatre (now the New Victory Theater), in the Theater District on 42nd Street, since 1902. Belasco was heavily focused on theatrical lighting; in many cases, he invested more money and devoted more time to a production's light rehearsal than to the combined total of all other production costs. By the mid-1900s, Belaso sought to develop a new theater where he could control all aspects of design.

=== Belasco operation ===
==== Development and early years ====
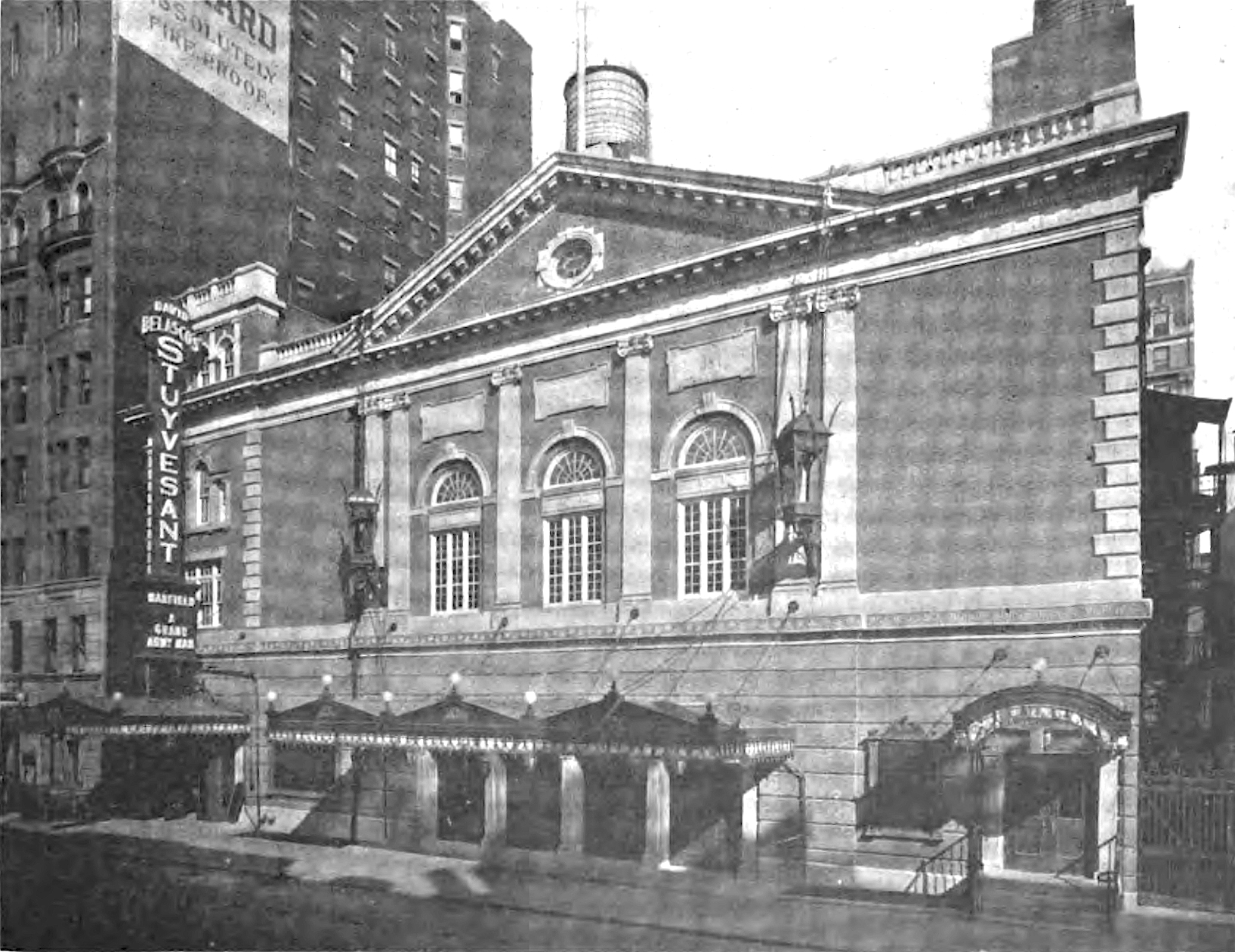
Stuyvesant Theatre in 1907, prior to the addition of Belasco's apartment atop the east (far right) pavilion

What is now the Belasco Theatre was developed by Meyer R. Bimberg, who organized the Stuyvesant Theatre Company in 1906 with $275,000 in capital. In June 1906, Belasco announced he would manage the theater and name it after Peter Stuyvesant, the New Amsterdam director-general. The theater would be designed by George Keister and would cost about $300,000. Keister filed plans with the New York City Department of Buildings in September 1906, by which the excavation was nearly completed. On December 5, 1906, several hundred guests including Bronson Howard, Blanche Bates, and Frances Starr attended the theater's cornerstone-laying ceremony, and the theater was formally dedicated as David Belasco's Stuyvesant Theatre. The total cost of the theater was estimated at more than $750,000, including $300,000 for the building itself.

David Belasco's Stuyvesant Theatre opened on October 16, 1907, with the musical A Grand Army Man featuring Antoinette Perry. One critic called the theater "the most complete and satisfactory playhouse in existence". Another publication said that the interior was "much the most beautiful in New York". Belasco served as the producer or director of almost 50 productions at the theater for the next two decades; the majority of these ran for at least a hundred performances. Among the early productions at the theater were The Warrens of Virginia and The Fighting Hope in 1908, as well as The Easiest Way in 1909. Belasco constructed the duplex apartment above the eastern part of the theater during 1909, and he finalized an agreement with Klaw and Erlanger that year, enabling their respective firms to display products at each other's theaters.

==== 1910 to 1930 ====
Just a Wife was produced at the Stuyvesant in early 1910. The Stuyvesant Theatre was renamed the Belasco Theatre on September 17, 1910, and the first Belasco Theatre on 42nd Street became Hammerstein's Republic Theatre. Not long afterward, the Belasco hosted The Concert (1910) and Return of Peter Grimm (1911), both with over 200 performances. The Belasco also hosted some musical performances, such as a wind instrument ensemble led by Georges Barrère, as well as a performance by the Trio de Lutece. In 1914, the theater hosted Molnár's The Phantom Rival, which introduced the concept of blacking out the lights to change sets and costumes, rather than lowering the curtain. The following year, the Belasco premiered The Boomerang, and the stage apron was adjusted for The Boomerang. Other notable productions in the 1910s included Seven Chances (1916) and Polly With a Past (1917).

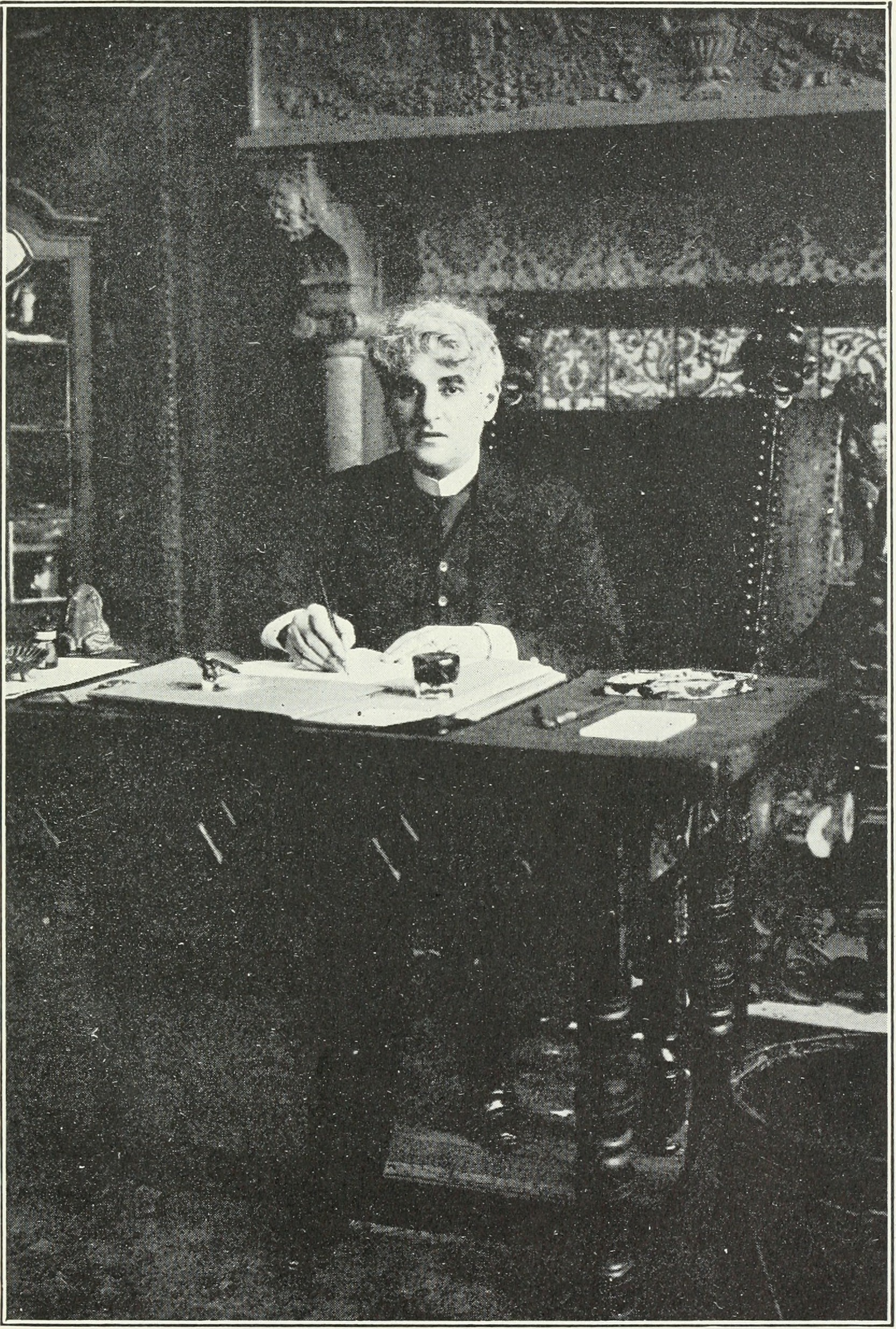
David Belasco in the workroom of his studio at the theater

In the 1910s and 1920s, David Belasco was particularly involved in the theatrical development of several actresses, including Blanche Bates, Ina Claire, Katharine Cornell, Jeanne Eagels, and Lenore Ulric. Among the films in which they starred were Polly With a Past, featuring Claire; Daddies (1918), with Eagles; and The Son-Daughter (1919), with Ulric. During the 1920s, Ulric appeared in Kiki (1921), The Harem (1924), Lulu Belle (1926), and Mima (1928). Theatrical historian Ken Bloom characterized the actresses as "Belasco heroines". Belasco initially paid close attention to accurate representation of details in the theater's productions. He was adamant that laundry scenes should contain functioning laundries capable of washing and ironing real clothes, and for one production he made a mockup of a Childs Restaurants franchise.

The Belasco hosted several other productions in the 1920s. Lionel Atwill starred in Deburau during 1920, and Kiki ran 580 performances the following year. The Belasco hosted Laugh, Clown, Laugh! with Lionel Barrymore in 1923, as well as Tiger Cats with Katharine Cornell in 1924. Lulu Belle was another successful production at the Belasco, with 461 performances. The Belasco also hosted the musical Hit the Deck in 1927, one of the few to take place in the theater. David Belasco renovated the theater for the production of Mima. Though he redesigned the proscenium arch's decorations and added metal sheathing to the balconies and orchestra boxes, he lost $250,000 on the productions. The Bachelor Father (1928) and It's a Wise Child (1929) were among the other successful productions of the 1920s. His last-ever production at the theater was Tonight or Never, which premiered in November 1930. Since Belasco missed the original opening performance of Tonight or Never due to illness, a second one was hosted for his benefit in March 1931.

=== After Belasco's death ===
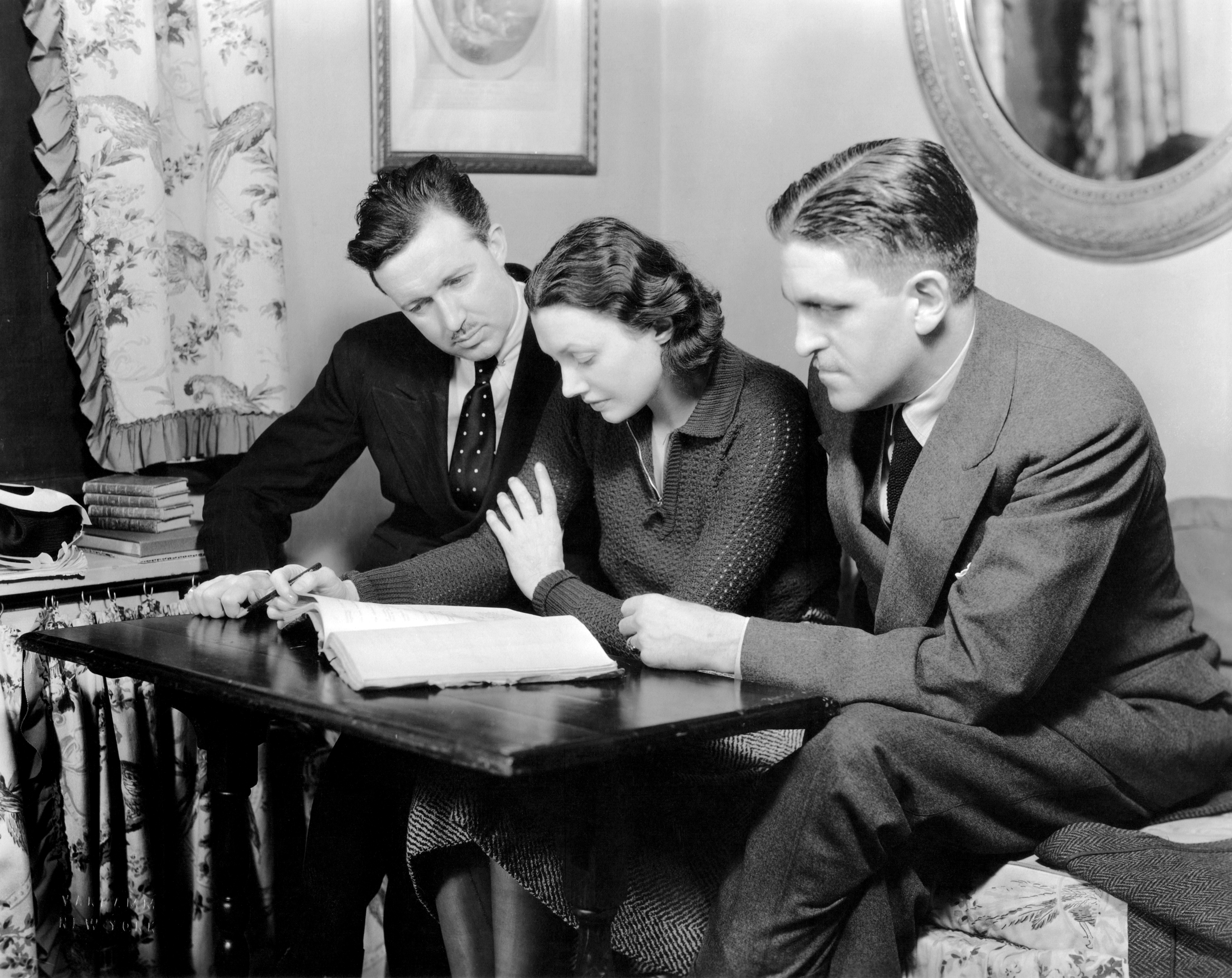
Guthrie McClintic, Katharine Cornell and Sidney Howard were photographed in Cornell's dressing room at the Belasco Theatre, studying Howard's play Alien Corn. Directed by McClintic, Cornell's production of the play opened February 20, 1933.

David Belasco died in May 1931 after a long illness, and theatrical manager B. F. Roeder was appointed as the executor of Belasco's estate, continuing to operate the theater. That August, Katherine Cornell and her husband Guthrie McClintic signed a lease to operate the theater for two years. At the time, the theater was appraised at $800,000. McClintic directed Brief Moment, the first production to take place at the theater under Cornell's management. Cornell herself appeared in two productions: Lucrece (1932) and Alien Corn (1933). Cornell and McClintic had six productions total, including Criminal at Large (1932). Hazel Rice, whose husband was playwright Elmer Rice, purchased the Belasco in August 1934 for $330,000. She made minor alterations to the theater but generally found it in "good condition". Rice had two productions, Judgment Day (1934) and Between Two Worlds (1934), both of which were flops. The Belasco estate filed to foreclose upon the theater in February 1936 and reacquired the theater from Rice that March.

In late 1934, the Group Theatre started showing its productions at the Belasco, relocating Gold Eagle Guy from another theater. The Group Theatre's subsequent productions included Awake and Sing!, Dead End, Golden Boy, and Rocket to the Moon. Dead End had 684 performances before closing in 1937, making it the Belasco's longest-running play, a record that stood for eight decades. The following decade commenced with the production My Dear Children in 1940. The play featured John Barrymore's last Broadway appearance and was generally negatively panned, even though its $50,000 of advance ticket sales was among the largest such figure of any Broadway show. More successful were Johnny Belinda (1940), Mr. and Mrs. North (1941), and Dark Eyes (1943).

The Belasco Theatre Corporation, a syndicate headed by John Wildberg, purchased the Belasco in May 1944 and leased it to Max Jelin for two years that July. A particularly controversial production was Trio, which discussed the topic of lesbianism when it opened in December 1944, but which was forced to close two months later in February 1945. In the aftermath of the Trio controversy, the theater's owners evicted Jelin, who was only reinstated in January 1946 after suing in the New York Supreme Court. Meanwhile, Judy Holliday had her first major success in Kiss Them for Me (1945), while Marlon Brando had his first widely noticed success in Truckline Cafe (1946). Other productions during the 1940s included Home of the Brave (1945), Burlesque (1946) with Bert Lahr, Me and Molly (1948) with Gertrude Berg, and The Madwoman of Chaillot (1948) with Martita Hunt and Estelle Winwood. Jelin initially refused to leave the theater when his lease expired in 1947, but the New York Supreme Court ultimately forced him to do so.

=== Shubert operation ===
==== 1950s to 1970s ====
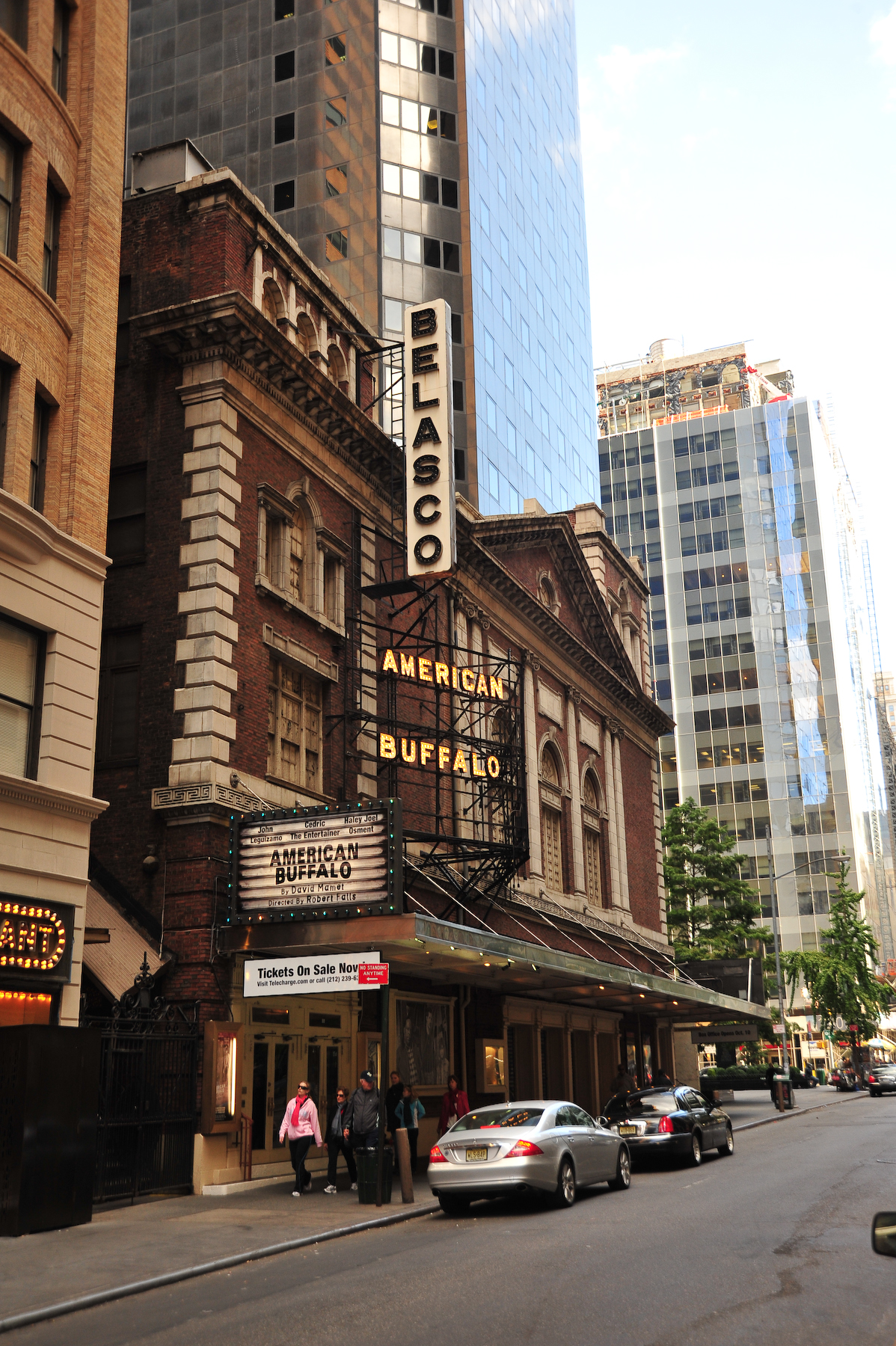
The theater as seen from the west

The Belasco Theatre was sold in November 1948 for $442,000 in cash. Although the new owners planned to demolish the theater in the future, the Shubert Organization took over management in the interim. The Shuberts themselves were subsequently reported as having been the buyers; by mid-1949, they were negotiating to lease it to NBC as a broadcast studio. NBC used the theater as a broadcast location for four years. At that time, several Broadway theaters had been converted to broadcast studios due to a lack of studio space in New York City. The studio broadcasts included plays from the Theatre Guild of the Air series and NBC Symphony Orchestra concerts. The game show Take It or Leave It was also broadcast from the Belasco while it was an NBC studio.

The Belasco reopened as a legitimate Broadway venue on November 5, 1953, with The Solid Gold Cadillac. Other Broadway productions in the 1950s included The Flowering Peach (1954), Will Success Spoil Rock Hunter? (1955), and Nude with Violin (1957). The Belasco's production of All the Way Home, which premiered in 1960, won the Pulitzer Prize for Drama. Other notable productions included Write Me a Murder (1961), Seidman and Son (1962), The Last Analysis (1964), Inadmissible Evidence (1965), and The Subject Was Roses (1966). The Killing of Sister George, which was hosted at the Belasco in 1966, was shown without incident, despite being more explicit about lesbian themes than Trio had two decades prior. The 1969 production Does a Tiger Wear a Necktie? featured the Broadway debut of Al Pacino.

With the decline of the Broadway-theater industry in the late 1960s, the quality of the Belasco's productions also decreased. A New York Times article in 1975 said the theater had "not seen the opening night of a hit since 1966", though the Belasco was still the second-oldest remaining Broadway theater, after the Lyceum. The off-Broadway production Oh! Calcutta!, a revue in which all the cast members were nude, moved from the Eden Theatre to the Belasco in 1971. Despite the quality of the productions, the Shubert Organization retained the Belasco in nearly original condition. For the production of The Rocky Horror Show (1975), the Shuberts added stands and temporarily removed some orchestra seating. This was followed by a series of short runs including An Almost Perfect Person (1977), The Goodbye People (1979), and Hide and Seek (1979). In the late 1970s, there were also plans to convert the Belasco to a cabaret venue.

==== 1980s and 1990s ====
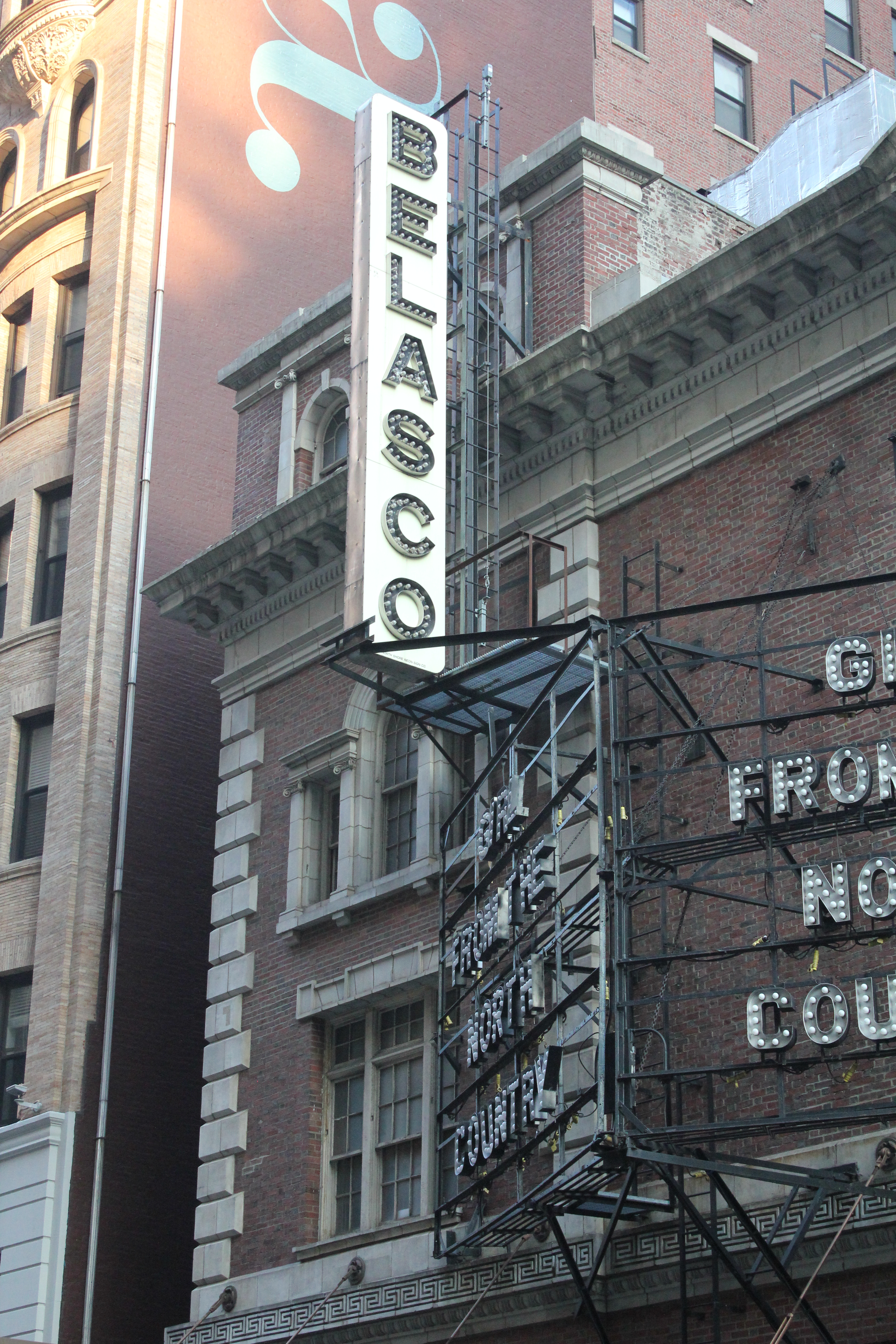
Sign on the Belasco's facade

Through the late 20th century, the Shuberts generally used the theater for the final runs of productions that had previously played at other Shubert venues. These productions included Ain't Misbehavin' (1981) and Accidental Death of an Anarchist (1984). Afterward, the Belasco remained inactive for two years, though the Shuberts agreed in 1985 to let the New York Shakespeare Festival use the Belasco rent-free. The festival opened in November 1986 and hosted students' Shakespeare productions at the theater through 1987. Joseph Papp led the program, whose $2.5 million cost was partly funded by the city government and several local newspapers.

During the 1980s, the Shuberts renovated the Belasco as part of a restoration program for their Broadway theaters. To raise money for the Belasco Theatre's upkeep, the Shubert Organization leased some of the site's unused air development rights to Feldman Equities in November 1986. The air rights were used to increase the height of the adjacent skyscraper being built at 120 West 45th Street. Under the terms of the deal, the Belasco had to remain active for as long as the skyscraper used the air rights. To increase the occupancy of the Belasco and other little-used Broadway theaters, the League of American Theaters and Producers negotiated with Broadway unions and guilds during the late 1980s.

The New York City Landmarks Preservation Commission (LPC) had started considering protecting the Belasco as an official city landmark in 1982, with discussions continuing over the next several years. The LPC designated both the facade and the interior as landmarks on November 4, 1987. This was part of the LPC's wide-ranging effort in 1987 to grant landmark status to Broadway theaters. The New York City Board of Estimate ratified the designations in March 1988. The Shuberts, the Nederlanders, and Jujamcyn collectively sued the LPC in June 1988 to overturn the landmark designations of 22 theaters, including the Belasco, on the merit that the designations severely limited the extent to which the theaters could be modified. The lawsuit was escalated to the New York Supreme Court and the Supreme Court of the United States, but these designations were ultimately upheld in 1992.

The Shuberts, the Nederlanders, and Jujamcyn formed the Broadway Alliance in June 1990, wherein each company set aside one of its theaters to present dramas and comedies at reduced ticket prices. The program covered the Belasco, Nederlander, and Walter Kerr theaters. The Belasco hosted The Speed of Darkness in 1991. The National Actors Theatre, led by Tony Randall, began showing productions at the Belasco later the same year. The Shuberts had leased the Belasco to the National Actors Theatre so the venue could remain active as part of the agreement concerning the theater's air rights. The National Actors Theatre had a "favorable" lease agreement, paying only for taxes, fixed expenses, and utility use. The group's inaugural program included revivals of The Crucible, The Little Hotel on the Side, and The Master Builder. The National Actors Theatre's productions at the Belasco were mostly flops. The Belasco was then used to host the puppet show A Little More Magic in 1994. The Belasco then hosted other productions such as Hamlet, A Doll's House, Honour, and Ring Round the Moon in the late 1990s. Feldman Equities considered buying the Belasco in 1996 but ultimately did not do so.

==== 2000s to present ====
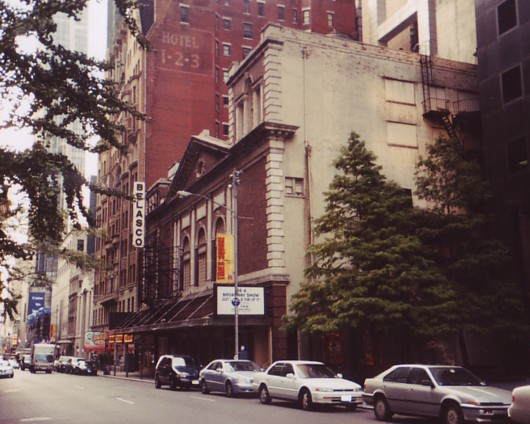
As seen from the east in 2002

The first musical to play the Belasco in the 2000s was James Joyce's The Dead. This was followed by the musical Follies in 2001 and Frankie and Johnny in the Clair de Lune in 2002. As part of a settlement with the United States Department of Justice in 2003, the Shuberts agreed to improve disabled access at their 16 landmarked Broadway theaters, including the Belasco. There were two short productions in that year: Enchanted April and Six Dance Lessons in Six Weeks. More productions followed later in the 2000s, including Dracula, the Musical, Julius Caesar, Awake and Sing!, Journey's End, Passing Strange, American Buffalo, and Joe Turner's Come and Gone. During the production of Awake and Sing! in 2006 and Joe Turner's Come and Gone in 2009, the theater was leased by Lincoln Center Theater.

In mid-2009, after Joe Turner's Come and Gone closed, the Belasco closed for a renovation. By then, producers considered the theater to be small compared to most other Broadway venues. Francesca Russo oversaw the restoration of the auditorium, while McLaren Engineering Group was the primary contractor. The boxes at the first balcony level were restored, and the segregated entrance providing access to the second balcony was removed. Decorative elements such as the stained glass and murals were restored, and amenities such as restrooms and seats were replaced. The theater reopened on October 2, 2010, with a showing of Women on the Verge of a Nervous Breakdown. In 2014, the musical Hedwig and the Angry Inch made its Broadway debut at the Belasco. Other shows at the Belasco in the 2010s included End of the Rainbow, Golden Boy, a double bill of Twelfth Night and Richard III, Blackbird, The Glass Menagerie, The Terms of My Surrender, Farinelli and the King, Gettin' the Band Back Together, and Network.

During November 2019, Netflix leased the theater to screen the Martin Scorsese film The Irishman. For The Irishman, the Belasco's first film screening in its history, the theater was retrofitted with a production booth, surround sound, and a projection screen. The theater staged Girl from the North Country in early 2020 before it closed on March 12, 2020, due to the COVID-19 pandemic. The theater reopened on October 13, 2021, with Girl from the North Country. That show closed in January 2022 before returning for a limited engagement from April to June. Ain't No Mo' was staged at the Belasco during December 2022, followed by Good Night, Oscar from April to August 2023. The musical How to Dance in Ohio opened at the Belasco in December 2023 for a limited run. The play Appropriate transferred to the Belasco in March 2024, following a run at the Hayes Theater, and ran until June. This was followed in November 2024 by the musical Maybe Happy Ending, which became the Belasco's longest-running show in July 2026.

== Alleged haunting ==
The Belasco Theater is the subject of an urban legend that David Belasco's ghost haunts the theater every night. According to actors and backstage personnel, the ghost would be seen in clerical-like wear, sitting in an empty box during the opening night of a production. Several actors have reported that the ghost would try to speak to them. One caretaker reportedly also heard rattling from the chains of Belasco's private elevator, which had long since been abandoned. Other accounts have described unexplained footsteps; doors and curtains moving randomly; and the elevator moving while not in use. Sightings of a second ghost, called the "Blue Lady", have been reported at the theater. This ghost, reported as an "icy cold blue mist", was supposedly an actress that fell to her death in an elevator shaft.

After Oh! Calcutta! played at the theater, the ghost of David Belasco reportedly stopped appearing. By the 2000s, people reported that the ghost had reappeared. In Hedwig and the Angry Inch, Hedwig briefly discusses the history of the Belasco and references the ghost of Belasco, claiming that if the ghost appears on a show's opening night, then the show is blessed. She then asks audience members in one of the boxes to tell her if the ghost appears.

== Notable productions ==
Productions are listed by the year of their first performance. This list only includes Broadway shows; it does not include programs broadcast from the theater, nor does it include films screened there.

Notable productions at the theater
Opening year	Name	Refs.
1907	A Grand Army Man	
1908	The Warrens of Virginia	
1910	Just a Wife	
1910	The Concert	
1916	Seven Chances	
1917	Polly With a Past	
1921	Deburau	
1926	Lulu Belle	
1927	Hit the Deck	
1932	The Truth About Blayds	
1932	Criminal at Large	
1932	Lucrece	
1935	Awake and Sing!	
1935	Waiting for Lefty	
1935	Dead End	
1937	Golden Boy	
1938	Rocket to the Moon	
1940	Johnny Belinda	
1941	The Man with Blond Hair	
1941	Clash by Night	
1942	Nathan the Wise	
1942	Magic and Hello Out There!	
1943	Dark Eyes	
1945	Kiss Them for Me	
1945	Home of the Brave	
1946	Truckline Cafe	
1946	Lysistrata	
1947	Sundown Beach	
1948	Me and Molly	
1948	The Madwoman of Chaillot	
1954	The Flowering Peach	
1955	Will Success Spoil Rock Hunter?	
1956	Fanny	
1957	The First Gentleman	
1957	Nude With Violin	
1958	Present Laughter	
1959	A Raisin in the Sun	
1960	All the Way Home	
1961	Write Me a Murder	
1964	The Seagull	
1964	The Crucible	
1965	Inadmissible Evidence	
1966	The Subject Was Roses	
1966	The Killing of Sister George	
1967	Dr. Cook's Garden	
1968	Don't Drink the Water	
1969	Does a Tiger Wear a Necktie?	
1971	Oh! Calcutta!	
1975	The Rocky Horror Show	
1977	American Buffalo	
1979	The Goodbye People	
1980	Your Arms Too Short to Box with God	
1981	Ain't Misbehavin'	
1983	Marcel Marceau On Broadway	
1984	Accidental Death of an Anarchist	
1986	Romeo and Juliet	
1986	As You Like It	
1986	Macbeth	
1991	The Speed of Darkness	
1991	The Crucible	
1992	The Master Builder	
1995	Hamlet	
1997	A Doll's House	
1998	Honour	
1999	Ring Round the Moon	
2000	James Joyce's The Dead	
2001	Follies	
2002	Frankie and Johnny in the Clair de Lune	
2003	Enchanted April	
2004	Dracula, the Musical	
2005	Julius Caesar	
2006	Awake and Sing!	
2007	Journey's End	
2008	Passing Strange	
2008	American Buffalo	
2009	Joe Turner's Come and Gone	
2010	Women on the Verge of a Nervous Breakdown	
2011	Kathy Griffin Wants a Tony	
2012	End of the Rainbow	
2012	Golden Boy	
2013	Twelfth Night and Richard III	
2014	Hedwig and the Angry Inch	
2016	Blackbird	
2017	The Glass Menagerie	
2017	Michael Moore: The Terms of My Surrender	
2017	Farinelli and the King	
2018	Gettin' the Band Back Together	
2018	Network	
2020	Girl from the North Country	
2022	Ain't No Mo'	
2023	Good Night, Oscar	
2023	How to Dance in Ohio	
2024	Appropriate	
2024	Maybe Happy Ending	

== See also ==
- List of Broadway theaters
- List of New York City Designated Landmarks in Manhattan from 14th to 59th Streets
