= Travelling salesman =

A travelling salesman is a travelling door-to-door seller of goods, also known as a peddler.

Travelling salesman may also refer to:

- Travelling salesman problem, in discrete or combinatorial optimization
- The Traveling Salesman, a 1908 play by James Forbes
  - The Traveling Salesman (1916 film), a silent film based on the play by Forbes
  - The Traveling Salesman (1921 film), a silent film based on the play by Forbes
- Travelling Salesman (2012 film), an intellectual thriller
- "Traveling Salesmen", the twelfth episode of the third season of the US version of The Office

== See also ==
- Death of a Salesman, a 1949 play by Arthur Miller about a traveling salesman
- Commercial traveller, in Australian English
