= Robert Strange (actor) =

American actor (1881–1952)

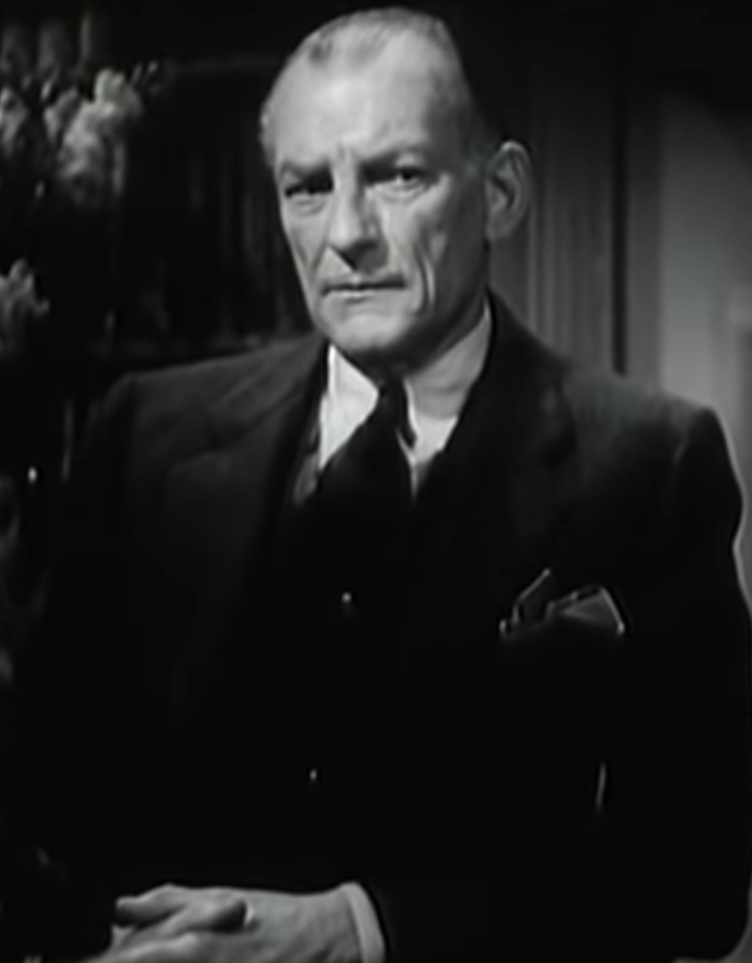
- Strange in The Mad Monster (1942)
- Born: November 26, 1881; New York, New York, U.S.
- Died: February 22, 1952 (aged 70); Woodland Hills, California, U.S.
- Resting place: Oakwood Memorial Park Cemetery
- Occupation: Actor
- Spouse(s): Florence Stockwell (m. 1905; div. 1915) Diantha Pattison (m. 1920; div. 1929) Ruth Dean Griffiths Rickaby (m. 1938)

Robert George Strange (November 26, 1881 – February 22, 1952) was an American actor during the first half of the 20th century, performing in theater and film. His Broadway career spanned 20 years, from 1913 through 1933, and included appearances in over 30 plays. He then appeared in film throughout the 1930s and 40s, in such roles as Waxey Armitage in Special Agent (1935), Dr. Hubert Foote in The Story of Vernon and Irene Castle (1939), Art in High Sierra (1941) and John Malcolm in Adventures of Captain Marvel (1941).

== Early life and career ==
Strange was born in New York City, the elder of two sons born to William Crawford Strange and Mary Young. He attended Columbia Grammar and Preparatory School and Columbia University, where he played football. He also set a bicycle-racing record at age seventeen and spent eight seasons as goaltender for the New York Athletic Club hockey team, helping the squad win two championships.

Strange started a real estate career, but was drawn to acting, performing with various companies, including one headed by Blanche Bates. He became a member of Washington Square Players, while remaining employed as supervisor of a diamond-cutting factory, before appearing in a string of Broadway plays from 1913 to 1933 (and occasionally thereafter), including The Famous Mrs. Fair, which ran for nearly a year.

== Later career ==
From 1931, after the introduction of sound films, he was "in constant demand" for character roles by the film studios. Some of his best known film roles were Waxey Armitage in Special Agent (1935), Dr. Hubert Foote in The Story of Vernon and Irene Castle (1939), Art in High Sierra (1941) and John Malcolm in Adventures of Captain Marvel (1941).

In the fall of 1940, having relocated to the San Fernando Valley, Strange and his wife, herself a veteran stage and radio actress, joined the faculty of the Leslie Academy of the Dance, directing its newly instituted drama program. An outgrowth of this development was their little theatre troupe, the Strange Show Shop. One notable alumnus of both the school and the troupe emerged the following summer, when 16-year-old Farley Granger delivered his "monologue satire" as part of an event staged to benefit the Van Nuys contingent of the Women's Ambulance and Defense Corps. As of October 1942, Granger was still being described as a "pupil of Mr. and Mrs. Strange."

== Personal life and death ==
Strange was married at least three times, the first two marriages ending in divorce. All three spouses were fellow performers. The first, Florence Edith Stockwell (1905–1915), was an accomplished contralto soloist who would fall victim to a fatal car crash just two years after their divorce. The second, from 1920 until 1929, was fellow thespian Diantha Pattison, with whom Strange collaborated extensively in 1922, when they joined Detroit's Woodward Players, performing a new play each week for seven months. In 1929, the couple's widely publicized divorce on grounds of adultery was uncontested and promptly granted to Pattison following "15 minutes of spicy testimony." Strange's final and most successful marriage, from October 1938 until his death, was to actress Ruth Dean Rickaby.

On February 22, 1952, Strange died at the Motion Picture Country Hospital in Los Angeles, California. Survived by his wife, his cremated remains were interred at the Oakwood Memorial Park Cemetery.

== Stage credits ==
Plays
Year	Play	Role	Theater	Notes
1913	Children of Tomorrow		Harris Theatre	December 1, 1913 – December 1913
1915	The Attick	Rev. Jonas Boutwell	Bandbox Theatre	October 4, 1915 – May 20, 1916
1915	The Age of Reason		Bandbox Theatre	October 4, 1915 – May 20, 1916
1916	The Seagull	Dr. Dorn	Bandbox Theatre	May 20, 1916 – May 31, 1916
1916	Literature		Comedy Theatre	August 30, 1916 – ?
1917	The Scrap of Paper		Criterion Theatre	September 17, 1917 – November 1917
1917	In the Zone		Comedy Theatre	October 31, 1917 – Apr 27, 1918
1918	Youth		Comedy Theatre	February 3, 1966 – March 13, 1966
1918	Mrs Warren's Profession	Sir George Crofts	Comedy Theatre	March 11, 1918 – November 11, 1918
1918	Nothing But Lies		Longacre Theatre	October 8, 1918 – February 1919
1919	I Love You		Booth Theatre, 48th Street Theatre	April 22, 1919 – ?, June 2, 1919 – ?
1919	First Is Last	Harvey	Maxine Elliott's Theatre	September 11, 1919 – November 1919
1919	The Famous Mrs. Fair	E. Dudley Gillette	Henry Miller's Theatre	December 22, 1919 – October 17, 1920
1921	Nobody's Money	Carl Russell	Longacre Theatre	August 17, 1921 – September 1921
1921	Wait Til We're Married	James Twells	Playhouse Theatre	September 26, 1921 – ?
1921	The Straw	Fred Nicholls	Greenwich Village Theatre	November 10, 1921 – November 1921
1922	Scandal	Sutherland York	Majestic Theatre	January 15, 1922 – January 20, 1922
1922	Common Clay	W. P. Yates	Majestic Theatre	January 30, 1922 – February 3, 1922
1922	It Pays to Advertise	Ellery Clark	Majestic Theatre	March 26, 1922 – March 31, 1922
1922	Under Cover	Steven Denby	Majestic Theatre	June 11, 1922 – June 15, 1922
1922	Kick In	Whip Fogarty	Majestic Theatre	July 9, 1922 – July 14, 1922
1922	Banco	George Dalou	Ritz Theatre	September 20, 1922 – November 1922
1923	Mike Angelo	Ivan Smirnoff	Morosco Theatre	January 8, 1923 – February 1923
1923	The Dice of the Gods	Buchanan Lawrence	National Theatre	April 5, 1923 – April 1923
1923	In Love With Love	Frank Oakes	Ritz Theatre	August 6, 1923 – November 1923
1924	The Dust Heap	Pat O'Day	Vanderbilt Theatre	April 24, 1924 – May 1924
1925	A Good Bad Woman	Dr. Carlyle Lawler	Comedy Theatre	February 9, 1925 – February 1925
1925	The Gorilla	Arthur Marsden	Comedy Theatre	April 28, 1925 – May 1925
1926	Sandalwood	George	Gaiety Theatre	September 22, 1926 – October 1926
1928	Heavy Traffic	Wilbur Richardson	Empire Theatre	September 5, 1928 – October 1928
1928	A Most Immoral Lady	Arthur Marsden	Cort Theatre	November 26, 1928 – April 1929
1929	A Strong Man's House	Simeon Fitch	Ambassador Theatre	September 16, 1929 – October 5, 1929
1929	Seven	Captain Otis	Theatre Republic	December 27, 1929 – January 1930
1930	Virtue's Bed	Major Harry Austin	Hudson Theatre	April 15, 1930 – June 1930
1930	Midnight	Plunkett	Guild Theatre, Avon Theatre	Dec 29, 1930 – Feb. 7, 1931
1931	Three Times the Hour	Lawrence M. Blake	Avon Theatre	August 25, 1931 – September 1931
1933	Marathon	"Too Soon" Decker	Mansfield Theatre	January 27, 1933 – January 1933
1933	Both Your Houses	Plunkett	Royale Theatre	March 6, 1933 – May 6, 1933
1934	We Die Exquisitely		Red Barn Theatre (Locust Valley, New York)	July 2, 1934 – July 8, 1934. "Melodrama set [aboard] luxury air liner," co-starring Lee Patrick and James Stewart.
1938	On Borrowed Time	Dr. Evans	Lobero Theater; Geary Theater; Biltmore Theater	July 4, 1938 – July 10, 1938, July 11, 1938 –? August 8, 1938 – August 20, 1938
1940	Margin for Error	Dr. Jennings	El Capitan Theater	March 23, 1940 – April 6, 1940
1940	Back to Eden		Wilshire Ebell Theatre	September 10, 1940 – September 15, 1940
1947	State of the Union	Senator Lauterback (replacement)	Hudson Theatre	May 19, 1947 – May 31, 1947

== Selected filmography ==
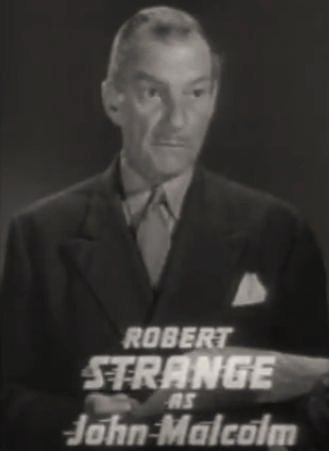
Strange in Adventures of Captain Marvel (1941)

- The Smiling Lieutenant (1931)
- The Cheat (1931)
- Misleading Lady (1932)
- These 30 Years (1933)
- Frisco Kid (1935)
- Special Agent (1935)
- Beware of Ladies (1936)
- The Murder of Dr. Harrigan (1936)
- The Walking Dead (1936)
- Trapped by Television (1936)
- Roaming Lady (1936)
- Spendthrift (1936)
- Beloved Enemy (1936)
- Stolen Holiday (1937)
- Marked Woman (1937)
- John Meade's Woman (1937)
- Sky Giant (1938)
- The Saint Strikes Back (1939)
- The Story of Vernon and Irene Castle (1939)
- You Can't Get Away with Murder (1939)
- They Made Me a Criminal (1939)
- The Angels Wash Their Faces (1939)
- Castle on the Hudson (1940)
- King of the Royal Mounted (1940)
- Gambling on the High Seas (1940)
- Robin Hood of the Pecos (1941)
- High Sierra (1941)
- Adventures of Captain Marvel (1941)
- Paper Bullets (1941)
- Desert Bandit (1941)
- Arizona Cyclone (1941)
- Paper Bullets (1941)
- The Mad Monster (1942)
- Perils of Nyoka (1942)
- Dead Men Walk (1943)
- Silver Trails (1949)
- The Far Frontier (1949)
