= The Chorus Lady =

1915 film by Frank Reicher

- Directed by: Frank Reicher
- Screenplay by: Marion Fairfax; James Forbes
- Produced by: Jesse L. Lasky
- Starring: Cleo Ridgely; Marjorie Daw; Wallace Reid; Richard Grey; Mrs. Lewis McCord
- Cinematography: Walter Stradling
- Production company: Jesse L. Lasky Feature Play Company
- Distributed by: Paramount Pictures
- Release date: October 18, 1915
- Country: United States
- Language: English

The Chorus Lady is a 1915 American comedy silent film directed by Frank Reicher. The screenplay was by Marion Fairfax and James Forbes. The film stars Cleo Ridgely, Marjorie Daw, Wallace Reid, Richard Grey and Mrs. Lewis McCord.

It is based on a book and play of the same name, written in 1906 by James Forbes, written in 1906 for Rose Stahl.

The film was released on October 18, 1915, by Paramount Pictures. It was remade in 1924 by Ralph Ince.

== Plot ==
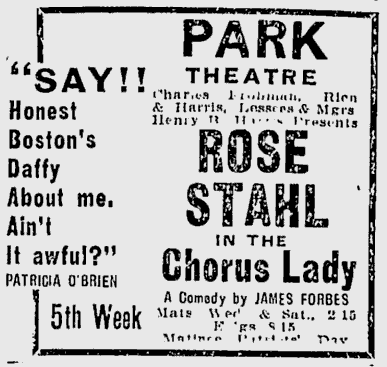
Advertisement for the play with Rose Stahl

Patricia O'Brian is engaged to Danny Mallory, a detective whose ambition is to own a farm and leave the Broadway life for the countryside. Patricia, on the other hand, is a chorus girl and, knowing the theater environment, tries to keep Nora, her younger sister, away from her. The girl, with a head full of crickets for the celebrity world, attracts the attention of Dicky Crawford, a patron of the womanizing arts who gets her a part in a show. Nora falls in love and Patricia tries to distract Crawford's interest from her sister by flirting with him. During the dress rehearsal, Patricia is chosen to replace the first sick actress. But, while in the dressing room, he sees a note that Nora is preparing to go to Crawford's apartment. Half dressed, he rushes to stop her, leaving the theater as he is, throwing on only a coat over the petticoat. At Crawford's house, the man tells her he is only interested in her. The two, however, are surprised by Danny who, working as an investigator for Crawford's wife, is looking for evidence to nail the man so that his wife can get a divorce. Having found his girlfriend wearing only underwear under her coat, Danny doesn't want to hear Patricia's protests of innocence. Only later, when Pat is about to be evicted, do the two manage to talk and clarify. Reconciled, they marry, moving to the countryside with Nora and her new boyfriend, a young stage assistant in love with her.

== Cast ==
- Cleo Ridgely as Patricia O'Brian
- Marjorie Daw as Nora O'Brian
- Wallace Reid as Danny Mallory
- Richard Grey as Dicky Crawford
- Mrs. Lewis McCord as Landlady

== Preservation status ==
- The film is now lost.
