= The Traveling Salesman (1921 film) =

1921 film

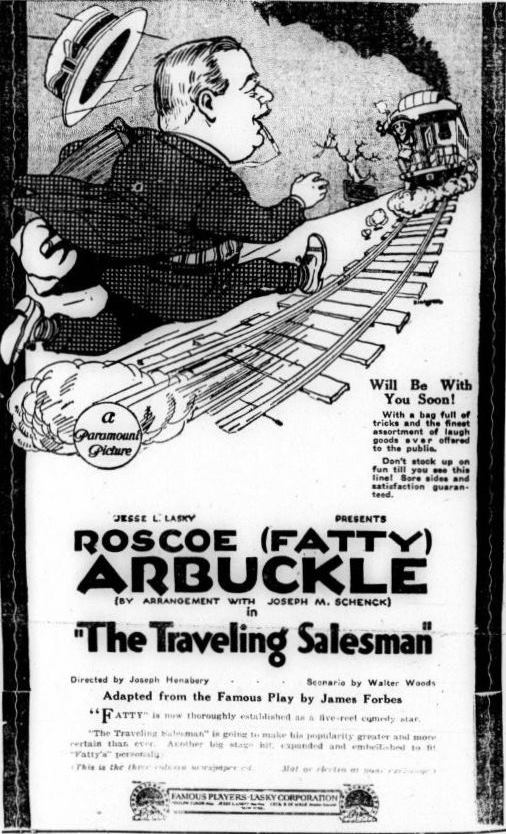
- Film's promotion in Variety, 1921
- Directed by: Joseph Henabery
- Written by: Walter Woods
- Based on: The Traveling Salesman by James Forbes
- Starring: Fatty Arbuckle
- Cinematography: Karl Brown
- Distributed by: Paramount Pictures
- Release date: June 5, 1921
- Running time: 5 reels; 4,514 feet
- Country: United States
- Language: Silent

The Traveling Salesman is a 1921 American silent comedy film starring Fatty Arbuckle. It is based on a 1908 play, The Traveling Salesman, by James Grant Forbes. A 1916 film adaptation of the play starred Frank McIntyre, who had also starred in the play. A print of The Traveling Salesman with German intertitles survives at the George Eastman House.

== Plot ==
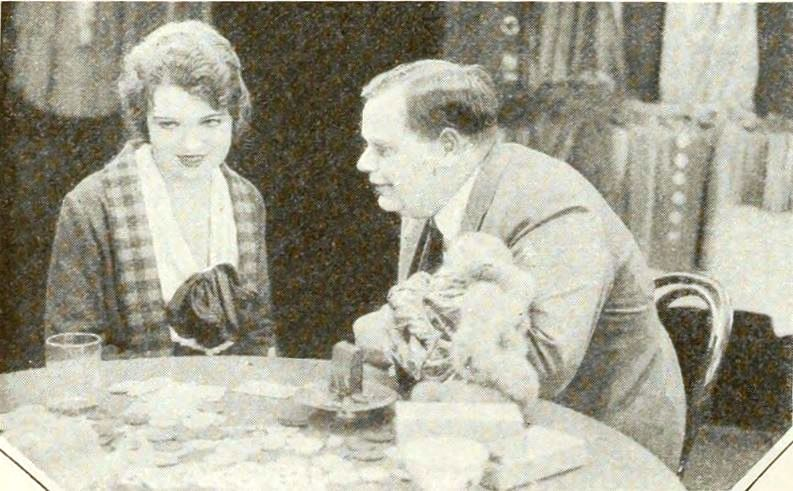
Film still with Clarke and Arbuckle

As described in a film publication, Bob Blake, a travelling salesman, is the victim of a practical joke and gets off the train before his intended destination of Grand River. Bob is drenched in the pouring rain and, when he cannot find lodging, breaks into a private house that the sheriff is going to sell for a tax delinquency. The house belongs to Beth Elliott, a telegraph operator at Grand River Station. Bob looks her up so he can pay for his lodging and falls in love with her. Franklin Royce, also in love with Beth, is jealous of Bob and accepts a proposition from Martin Drury to trick Beth out of the proceeds of the tax sale. In the end, Bob saves the house and wins the girl.

== Cast ==
- Roscoe "Fatty" Arbuckle as Bob Blake
- Betty Ross Clarke as Beth Elliott
- Frank Holland as Franklin Royce
- Wilton Taylor as Martin Drury
- Lucille Ward as Mrs. Babbitt
- Jim Blackwell as Julius
- Richard Wayne as Ted Watts
- George C. Pearce as John Kimball (as George Pearce)
- Robert Dudley as Pierce Gill

== Production ==
The railroad scenes were filmed on the Sierra Railroad in Tuolumne County, California.
