= Frank McIntyre =

Frank McIntyre may refer to:

- Frank McIntyre (actor) (1879–1949), American actor
- Frank McIntyre (baseball) (1859–1887), American baseball player
- Frank McIntyre (military officer) (1865–1944), American military officer
