= The Chorus Lady (1924 film) =

1924 film

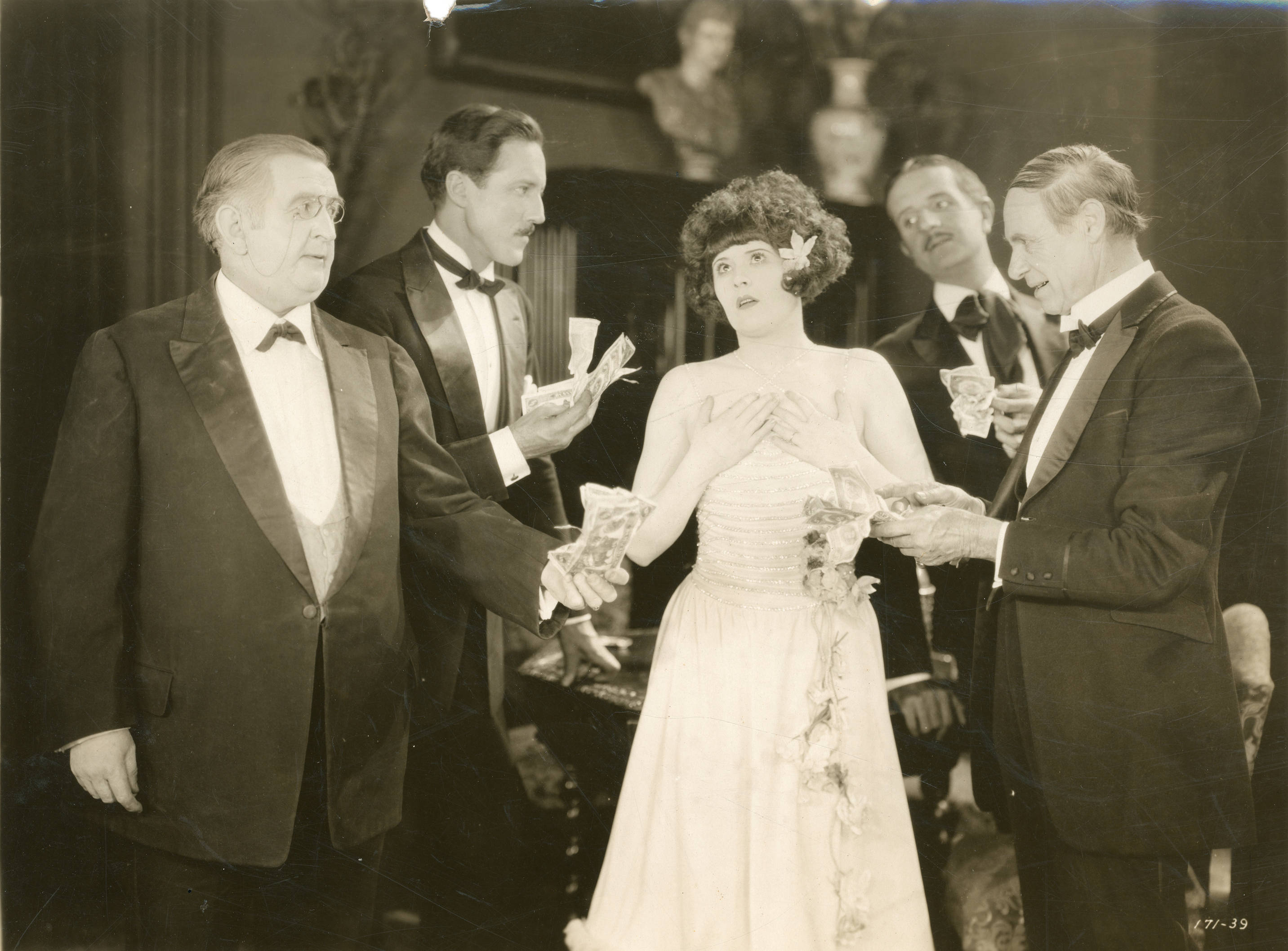
- Still with Margaret Livingston
- Directed by: Ralph Ince
- Written by: Bradley King
- Based on: The Chorus Lady by James Forbes
- Starring: Margaret Livingston; Alan Roscoe; Virginia Lee Corbin
- Cinematography: Glen Gano
- Production company: Regal Pictures
- Distributed by: Producers Distributing Corporation
- Release date: November 23, 1924
- Running time: 7 reels
- Country: United States
- Language: Silent (English intertitles)

The Chorus Lady is a 1924 American silent drama film directed by Ralph Ince and starring Margaret Livingston, Alan Roscoe, and Virginia Lee Corbin. It is based on the play of the same name by James Forbes, which was previously filmed in 1915 as The Chorus Lady.

== Plot ==
Entertainer Patricia O'Brien (Livingston) is engaged to Dan Mallory (Roscoe), who races horses. When his prize horse "Lady Belle" is blinded in a fire, the wedding is postponed. Patricia returns to New York City with her younger sister Nora (Corbin) to work in the Follies. Dan enters his blind horse in a $20,000 race and wins, so he goes to New York City to finish the wedding. Things go awry when he finds Patricia in the apartment of Dick Crawford (McCullough). However, it turns out that she went there to rescue her younger sister Nora.

== Cast ==
- Margaret Livingston as Patricia O'Brien
- Alan Roscoe as Dan Mallory
- Virginia Lee Corbin as Nora O'Brien
- Lillian Elliott as Mrs. Patrick O'Brien
- Lloyd Ingraham as Patrick O'Brien
- Philo McCullough as Dick Crawford
- Eve Southern as Miss Simpson
- Mervyn LeRoy as Duke, the jockey
- Billy Seay as Little Boy (uncredited)

== Preservation ==
The Chorus Lady is considered to be a lost film.

== Bibliography ==
- Darby, William (1991). Masters of Lens and Light: A Checklist of Major Cinematographers and Their Feature Films. Scarecrow Press. ISBN 978-0-8108-2454-6
- Lussier, Tim (2018). "Bare Knees" Flapper: The Life and Films of Virginia Lee Corbin. Jefferson, North Carolina: McFarland. ISBN 978-1-4766-7568-8.
