= The Famous Mrs. Fair =

1923 film

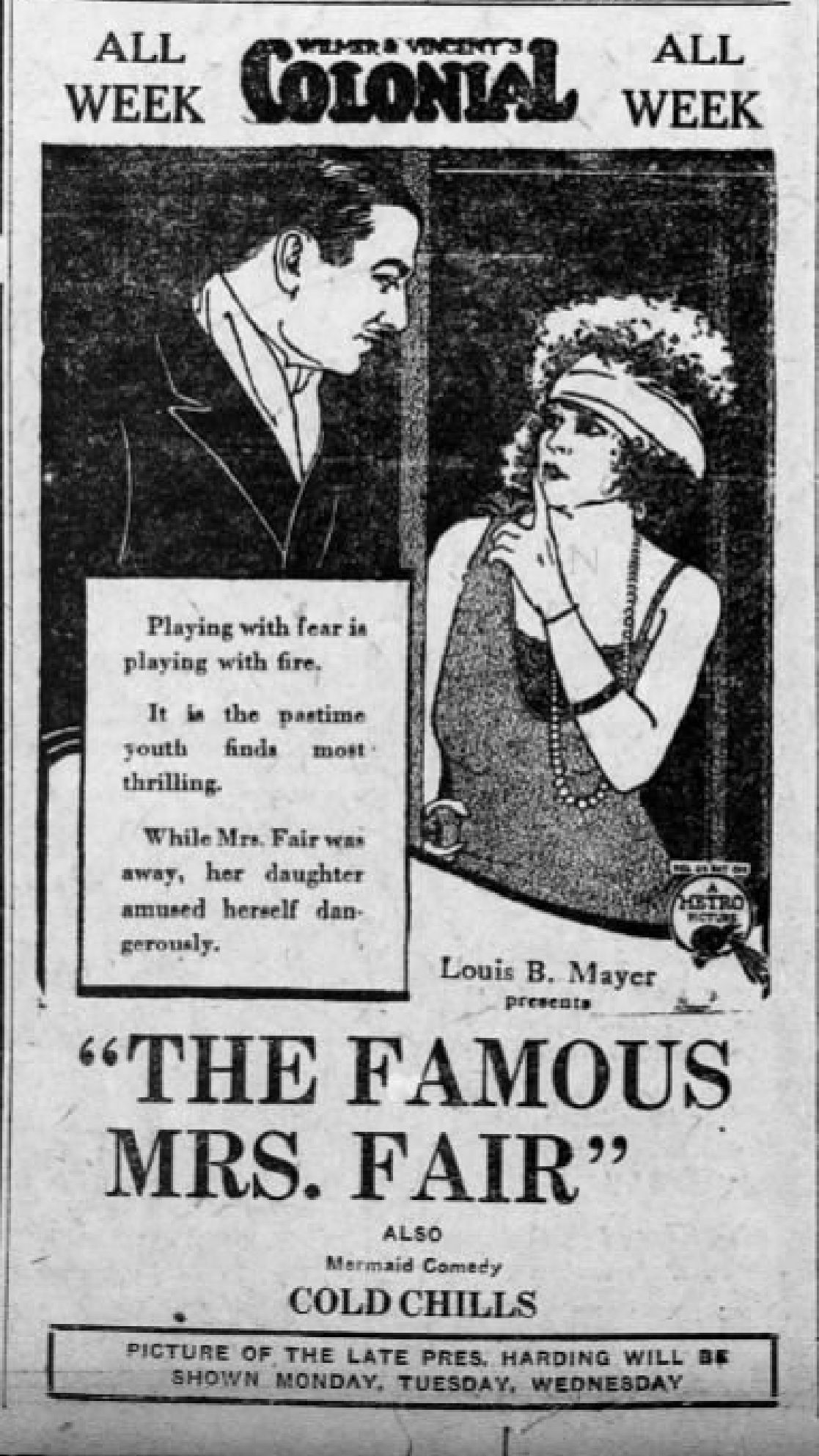
- Newspaper advertisement
- Directed by: Fred Niblo
- Written by: Frances Marion (scenario)
- Based on: The Famous Mrs. Fair by James Forbes
- Produced by: Louis B. Mayer
- Starring: Myrtle Stedman; Huntley Gordon
- Cinematography: Charles Van Enger
- Edited by: Lloyd Nosler
- Production company: Louis B. Mayer Productions
- Distributed by: Metro Pictures
- Release date: February 19, 1923
- Running time: 80 minutes
- Country: United States
- Language: Silent (English intertitles)

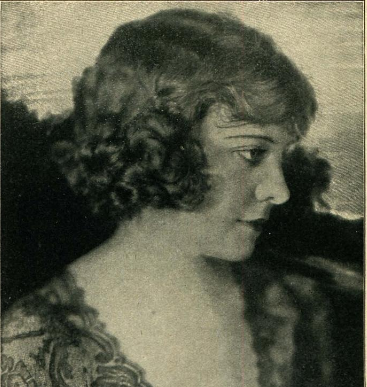
Myrtle Stedman, in The Famous Mrs. Fair

The Famous Mrs. Fair is a 1923 American silent drama film produced by Louis B. Mayer, distributed through Metro Pictures, and directed by Fred Niblo. The film is based on the Broadway play of the same name by James Forbes that had starred Blanche Bates in the 1919 theatre season. Brief behind-the-scenes production footage is extant in the recently restored Souls for Sale (1923).

== Cast ==
- Myrtle Stedman as Mrs. Fair
- Huntley Gordon as Jeffrey Fair
- Marguerite De La Motte as Sylvia Fair
- Cullen Landis as Alan Fair
- Ward Crane as Dudley Gillette
- Carmel Myers as Angy Brice
- Helen Ferguson as Peggy
- Lydia Yeamans Titus
- Dorcas Matthews
- Frankie Bailey
- Josephine Kirkwood
- Muriel Beresford
- Eva Mudge
- Kathleen Chambers
- Peggy Blackwood

== Preservation ==
A complete copy is held at the George Eastman Museum, donated by MGM for preservation.
