= The Famous Mrs. Fair (play) =

1919 play by James Forbes

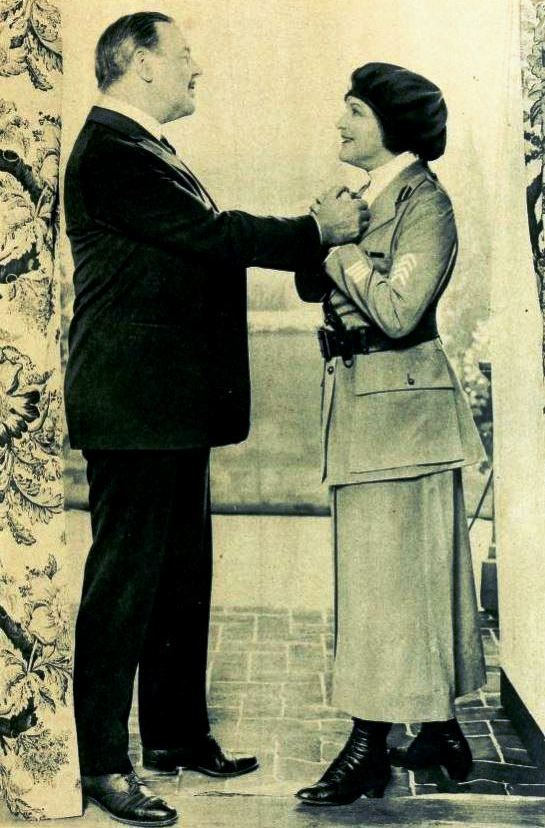
- Henry Miller and Blanche Bates
- Original language: English
- Written by: James Forbes
- Subject: Post-war domestic adjustment
- Genre: Comedy drama
- Setting: The Fairs' home on Long Island and their New York apartment.

Premiere
- Date: December 22, 1919
- Place: Henry Miller's Theatre
- Directed by: Henry Miller

The Famous Mrs. Fair is a 1919 play by James Forbes. It is a four-act hybrid genre work, starting as light comedy than progressing to drama. It has two settings and thirteen speaking parts. The action of the play takes place over six months time. The story concerns an American woman, returned home from four years with a volunteer ambulance unit in France, who abandons her neglected family again for a speaking tour.

The play was produced by Abe Erlanger in association with Henry Miller, the latter also acting as director. The Famous Mrs. Fair starred Miller and Blanche Bates with Margalo Gillmore. It had a week-long tryout in Baltimore during December 1919, and premiered in Manhattan the same month. The production ran the rest of that season on Broadway and into the next, ending in October 1920 after 341 performances. Burns Mantle included The Famous Mrs. Fair among his compilation of The Best Plays of 1919-20.

The Famous Mrs. Fair was adapted for a 1923 silent film of the same name.

== Characters ==
Characters are listed in order of appearance within their scope.

Lead

- Sylvia Fair is 18, initially naive and sweet, who is rendered vulnerable by neglect and a malign suitor.
- Nancy Fair is a famous war celebrity, a French Army volunteer ambulance unit Major, awarded the Croix de Guerre.
- Jeffrey Fair is fifty; he has spent the war in Washington D.C. overseeing war supply costs.

Supporting

- Alan Fair is Nancy's older brother, an ex-Yale student, now a demobilized US Army Captain.
- E. Dudley Gillette is 35, an opportunistic and overly suave business agent for lecture tours.
- Anjelica Brice called Angy, is a thirtyish blonde widow, stylish and appealingly feminine.
- Peggy Gibbs is 23, a private secretary in a law firm, clear-headed and sincere.

Featured

- Nora is the Irish housemaid for the Fairs on Long Island.
- Mrs. Norman Wynne called Biddy, is thirtyish and the closest to Nancy among her old ambulance unit.
- Mrs. Kellett Brown called Buster Brown, is thirtyish and another member of Nancy's unit.
- Mrs. Stuart Perrin called Mary Anne, is also thirtyish and another member of Nancy's unit.
- Mrs. Leslie Converse called Lila, is also thirtyish and a unit member.
- Mrs. Gilbert Wells called Wellsie, is fiftyish and the senior member of Nancy's unit.

Off stage

- Tom Gibbs is Peggy's brother, an army buddy of Alan Fair and now a police detective.

== Synopsis ==
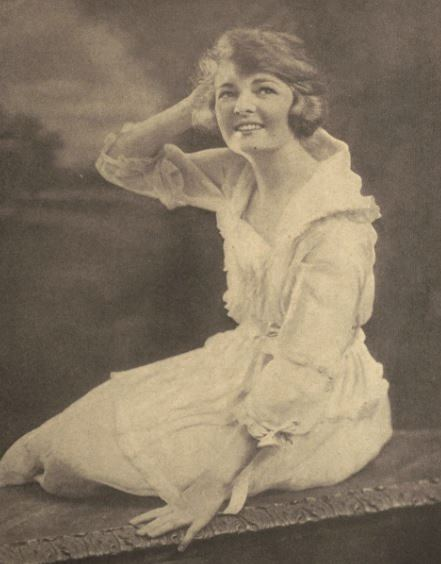
Margalo Gillmore

Act I (The living room of the Fair home on Long Island. A morning in May 1919.) Sylvia and Alan discuss their mother's home coming after four years away. Alan telephones Peggy, and Sylvia guesses they are engaged. Nora brings in E. Dudley Gillette, who has a contract for public lectures for their mother. Alan takes a dislike to him, but Sylvia is startled by his obvious interest in her. Alan sends Gillette away, keeping the contract which he means to destroy. Neighbor Angy Brice brings some violets for their mother's welcome. Sylvia is delighted; Angy has been her friend since her mother went away. Alan, however, is cold to her, knowing her interest in their wealthy father. She is still there when Jeffrey brings in Nancy, having met her at the dock. Nancy is delighted at how Sylvia has grown, but puzzled by Angy's presence. She is amused by Jeffrey's discomfiture, but is distracted by the arrival of her old ambulance unit, five women who served with her in France. Alan warns Jeffrey and Sylvia that Nancy will soon experience boredom with peace time life, as he did when demobilized. (Curtain)

“ANGY. (sighing) I'd like to be celebrated and have women like me.
JEFFREY. They do.
ANGY. They don't. All their nasty husbands do.
JEFFREY. Why aren't you as nice to the wives?
ANGY. I don't get a chance. The husbands always grab me and rush me off to a corner. The next man I marry has to build me a house that's perfectly round. I'm sick of corners.”
– From Act II of The Famous Mrs. Fair

Act II (Same as Act I. An afternoon in June.) Nancy's old coterie is once again visiting. Though they have abandoned uniforms, their reminisces and attention feed Nancy's thirst for a cause to fight. Sylvia has at last begun to sense Angy's attentions to her father, and their friendship cools, while Alan openly spars with the widow, who maintains her composure. Alan finally tells his father about Peggy, who has come to tea. Jeffrey has a conversation with Peggy, and approves of her, despite her being a middle-class suffragist. But Jeffrey is aghast that Alan has not yet spoken of her to Nancy. Before Alan can do so, Gillette hustles Nancy and her crew off to be photographed. He is still pressing her to sign a contract for a speaking tour. Angy lures Jeffrey outside where she subtly feeds his resentment about Nancy's distance from her family. Gillette flirts with Sylvia, who is unused to male attention, though she is perceptive enough to realize he is pumping her for information about Nancy's intentions. When Nancy returns, she is terribly hurt to learn of her son's engagement. Peggy leaves to avoid a scene. Jeffrey tries to forbid Nancy from going on tour, but she defies him by signing Gillette's contract. (Curtain)

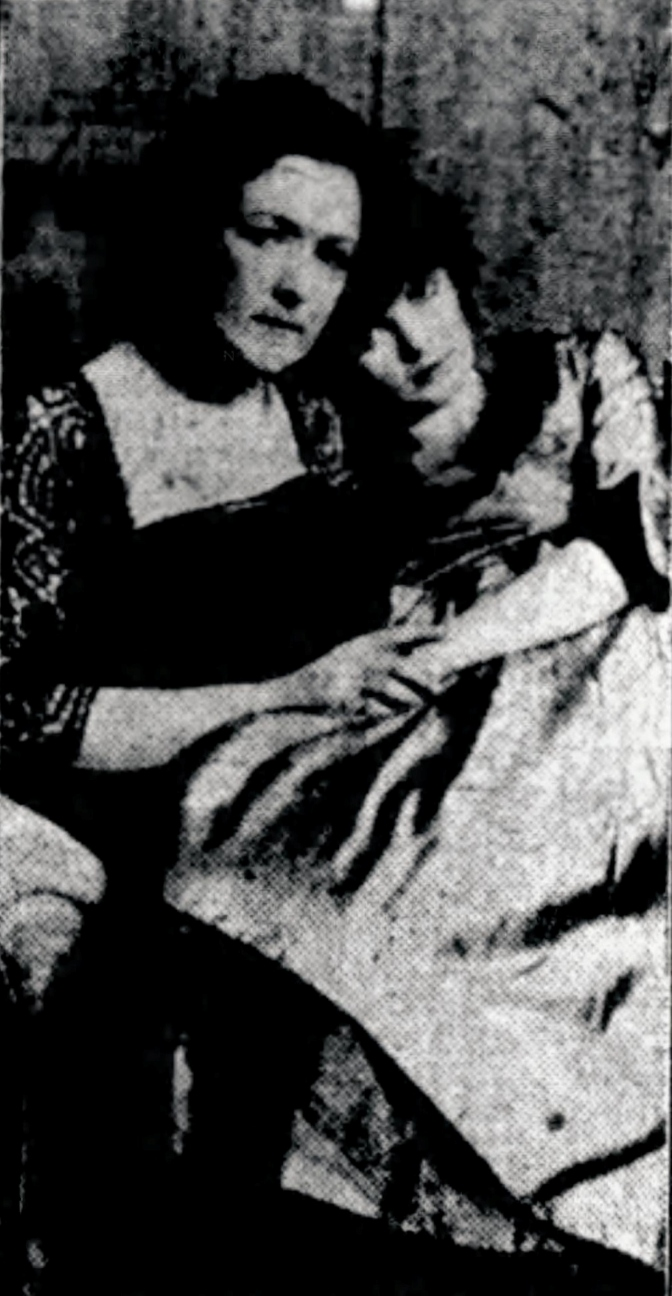

Act III (The New York apartment of Jeffrey Fair. An evening in October, just after 9pm.) From exposition between Alan and Jeffrey we learn that Nancy has just returned from a three month speaking tour, but is planning to attend a banquet that night. Sylvia accompanied Nancy for a month, but then came back to New York. Jeffrey took the apartment in New York so she could have some company. Alan and Peggy are married and living in an apartment, so Sylvia is unsupervised by family, for Angy Brice has come to town and is monopolizing Jeffrey. Nancy now comes in to ask if Sylvia has returned; she also tells Alan to bring Peggy sometime, as she wants to make her peace with her. Alan is delighted, and rushes off to Peggy's office. Sylvia arrives home, and her mother is appalled at her daughter's appearance. She wears mascara, lipstick and rouge, and sports the clothes and hat of a chorus girl. Indeed, she has been consorting with chorus girls introduced to her by Gillette, who is taking her to dinner. Nancy is surprised to learn of Gillette's liberality in squiring Sylvia about town. She cuddles Sylvia on her lap, wipes away the makeup and then sends her to her room. When Gillette arrives for Sylvia, Nancy confronts him with demands for the lecture tour money he owes her and to stop seeing Sylvia. Gillette agrees, but instead of saying goodbye to Sylvia, convinces her to run away with him by telling her of Jeffrey's affair with Angy. Nancy and Jeffrey blame each other for Sylvia's neglect. When Jeffrey admits to having paid off Angy to end their affair, Nancy asks for a divorce. But Alan and Peggy rush in, having seen Sylvia and Gillette leave together in a taxi. Nancy is aghast, but Alan phones Tom Gibbs to set the police on Gillette. (Curtain)

Act IV (Same as Act III. Two hours later.) Peggy tries to comfort Nancy, while Jeffrey and Alan are out with the police. When Jeffrey returns, he tells Nancy that Gillette wants to marry Sylvia to stop Nancy prosecuting him for fraud. Alan returns with Sylvia; the police had caught up with her and Gillette at the train station. Sylvia is angry and hurt with her family for ignoring her. She asks, "Why drag me back here when no one wants me?" Her emotional breakdown is followed by Peggy's recounting of Gillette's prior links with charity fraud. Nancy and Jeffrey reconcile with each other and Sylvia. When Peggy asks where Gillette is, Alan replies, "In an ambulance" while showing his fists. (Curtain)

== Original production ==
=== Background ===
Henry Miller, Blanche Bates, and Holbrook Blinn had starred on Broadway during Spring 1919 with Molière by Philip Moeller. Miller and Bates took the production on tour to the West Coast starting in July 1919. During the Actors' Equity Association (Equity) strike of July-September 1919, Miller and Bates were able to keep touring in Molière as the strike did not reach the Western states. Miller, Bates, and Blinn became members of the Actors' Fidelity League (Fidelity), the short-lived rival to Equity favored by actor-managers. When the strike was settled, the Molière tour came back east, finishing up in Boston and Brooklyn during November 1919.

Shortly after their tour ended, an announcement reported that rehearsals had begun for another play in which they would co-star, The Famous Mrs. Fair by James Forbes. Forbes had served as chairman for the Over There Theatre during World War I, arranging volunteer entertainment units for the American Expeditionary Forces. Abe Erlanger would produce the play in association with Henry Miller, who would stage it. By December 13, 1919, the storyline and cast were revealed, the latter including an ingenue named Margalo Gillmore. Gillmore had not been on the stage long; she had played small parts in several mediocre works before Mrs. Fair. But she did have two assets that recommended her for casting: she was a daughter of Frank Gillmore, executive secretary of Equity, and she counted as personal acquaintances a number of drama critics such as Alexander Woollcott, George S. Kaufman, Brock Pemberton, and Heywood Broun, in a social circle that would later be called the Algonquin Round Table.

=== Cast ===
Principals only from the Baltimore tryout through the Broadway run.
| Role | Actor | Dates | Notes and sources |
|---|---|---|---|
| Sylvia Fair | Margalo Gillmore | Dec 22, 1919 - Oct 17, 1920 | |
| Mrs. Nancy Fair | Blanche Bates | Dec 22, 1919 - Oct 17, 1920 | |
| Jeffrey Fair | Henry Miller | Dec 22, 1919 - Apr 20, 1920 | Due to Miller's foot injury, performances were cancelled from April 21 through April 23, 1920. |
| Jeffrey Fair | Holbrook Blinn | Apr 24, 1920 - Apr 27, 1920 | Blinn took Miller's place while he recuperated, but yielded first billing to Blanche Bates. |
| Jeffrey Fair | Henry Miller | Apr 28, 1920 - Oct 17, 1920 | Miller resumed his performance and his first billing. |
| Alan Fair | Jack Devereaux | Dec 22, 1919 - Oct 17, 1920 | Devereaux was married to actress Louise Drew. |
| E. Dudley Gillette | Robert Strange | Dec 22, 1919 - Oct 17, 1920 | |
| Angelica Brice | Virginia Hammond | Dec 22, 1919 - Oct 17, 1920 | |
| Peggy Gibbs | Kathleen Comegys | Dec 22, 1919 - Oct 17, 1920 | |
| Nora | Betty Hall | Dec 22, 1919 - Oct 17, 1920 | |
| Mrs. Norman Wynne | Dallas Tyler | Dec 22, 1919 - Oct 17, 1920 | |
| Mrs. Kellet Brown | Marian Lord | Dec 22, 1919 - Oct 17, 1920 | |
| Mrs. Stuart Perrin | Maude Allen | Dec 22, 1919 - Oct 17, 1920 | |
| Mrs. Leslie Converse | Alice Baxter | Dec 22, 1919 - Oct 17, 1920 | |
| Mrs. Gilbert Wells | Florence Williams | Dec 22, 1919 - Oct 17, 1920 | |

=== Tryout ===
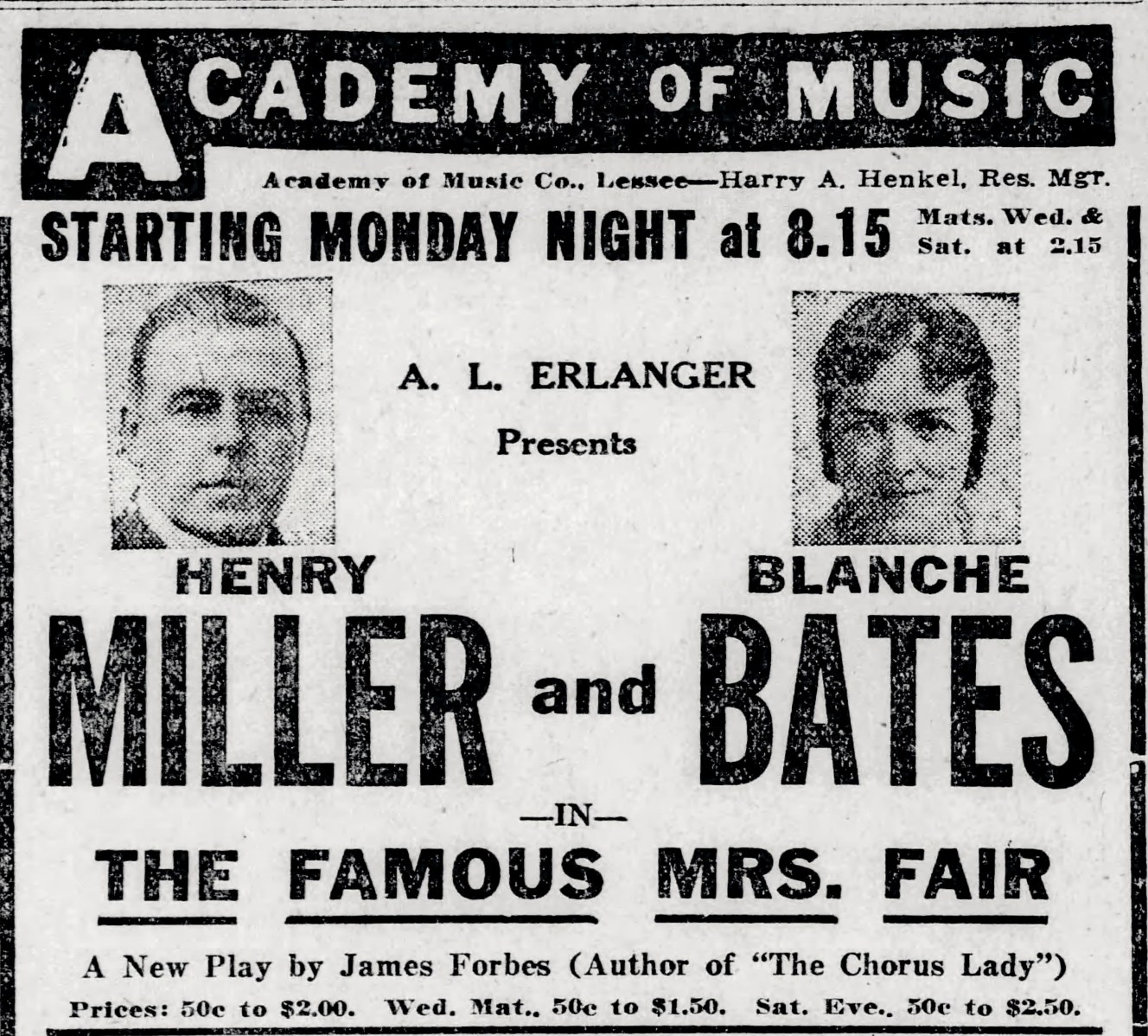

The Famous Mrs. Fair had a one-week tryout at the Academy of Music in Baltimore, beginning December 15, 1919. The reviewer for The Evening Sun commended James Forbes for "a serious and thoughtful play", and the cast for an "extremely well-acted" production. They remarked on the similarity of theme for the mother-daughter relationship with He and She by Rachel Crothers. The character of Sylvia Fair was identified as the most interesting of the work, and Margalo Gillmore praised for an "admirable grace" in presenting it. The only weakness was a lengthy lead into the third act, according to the reviewer.

=== Broadway premiere and reception ===
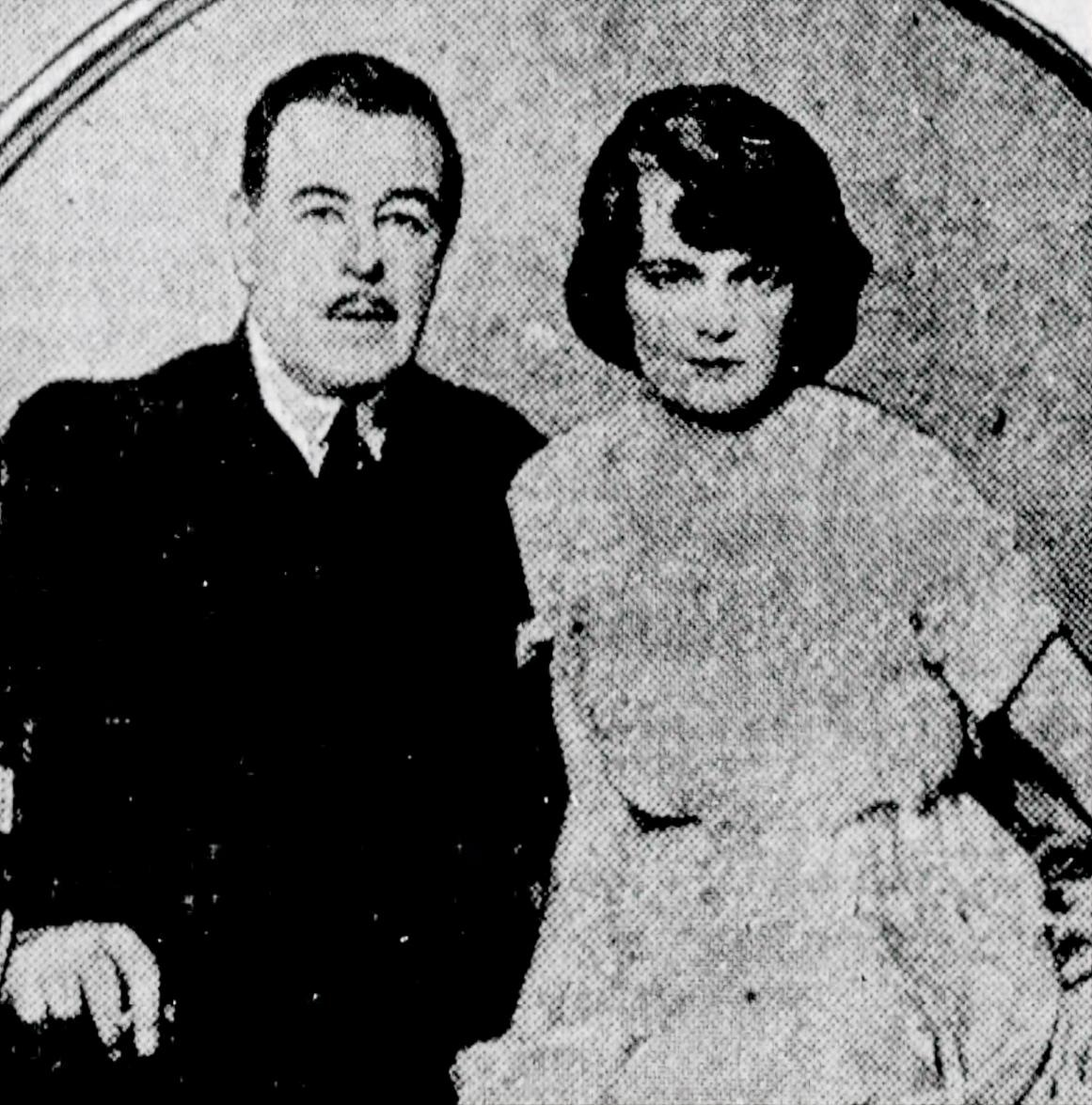
Henry Miller and Margalo Gillmore

The play had its Broadway premiere at the Henry Miller's Theatre on December 22, 1919. The critic for the Brooklyn Standard Union said "Margalo Gillmore made a hit" and the play would be around for a long time. The reviewer for The Brooklyn Daily Eagle said Henry Miller had a fortunate change of luck with The Famous Mrs. Fair, worth any two of the mediocre works he had recently presented. They also complimented his acting, but were less enthused about Blanche Bates "in the last act, which she fills with much naturalistic nonsense."

The theme of conflict between a woman's career outside the home and familial obligations was raised by The Brooklyn Daily Times critic, and expanded upon by Heywood Broun in his review. Broun extolled the play's merits, though the playwright's message went against his own feminist beliefs. He noted that Forbes avoided saying "A woman's place is in the home" or similar overt sayings in favor of subtlety conveying that message. Broun made much of Margalo Gillmore's eclipsing the two stars: "She gave a truly extraordinary performance, and not a creation of merely static character, but of the development and change from act to act", for which the audience rewarded her with cheers after the third act. Alexander Woollcott also identified the play's main theme as the choice between home and career for women, and he concurred with Heywood Broun about Margalo Gillmore's acting, but lauded Blanche Bates as well. Woollcott also mentioned another Forbes theme: the disquiet and lack of purpose felt by the recently demobilized.

When the first annual volume of The Best Plays series was published in June 1920, editor Burns Mantle included it among the nine best works of the season. The production celebrated its 300th performance with the matinee on Saturday, September 11, 1920.

=== Broadway closing ===
The Famous Mrs. Fair closed at Henry Miller's Theatre on October 16, 1920, after 341 performances. (Note: This includes 300 with the Saturday matinee of September 11, 1920, plus the evening performance that same day, and forty more during the five remaining weeks ending October 16, 1920.) The theater then went dark until November, while The Famous Mrs. Fair company went immediately on tour to the Broad Street Theatre in Philadelphia, starting October 18, 1920.

== Adaptations ==
=== Film ===
- The Famous Mrs. Fair - 1923 silent film adaptation by Frances Marion, directed by Fred Niblo, and produced by Louis B. Meyer through Metro Pictures. It starred Myrtle Stedman, Huntley Gordon, and Marguerite De La Motte.

== Bibliography ==
- Burns Mantle (ed). The Best Plays of 1919-20 And The Year Book Of The Drama In America. Small, Maynard & Company, 1920.
- James Forbes. The Famous Mrs. Fair and Other Plays. George H. Doran Company, 1920.
- Frank Case. Tales of a Wayward Inn. Garden City Publishing Company, 1940.
