= Milton Fennimore Davis =

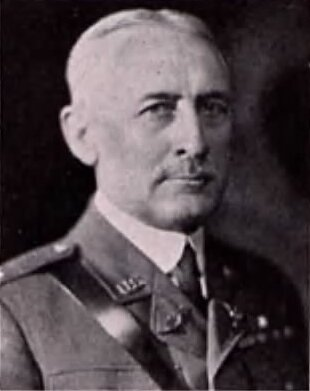
- Born: 15 November 1864; Mantorville
- Died: 31 May 1938; Cornwall-on-Hudson
- Resting place: West Point Cemetery
- Education: University of Oregon, United States Military Academy
- Employer: New York Military Academy
- Spouse: Blanche Bates

Milton Davis (November 15, 1864 – May 31, 1938) was an American military leader who served as the Commandant of the New York Military Academy from June 19, 1909 to February 26, 1918.

== Career ==
Davis graduated in 1890 from the United States Military Academy in West Point, having been appointed by Congressman Binger Herman.

When Yosemite National Park was created in 1890, the U. S. Army took over the administration of the federal area. To aid patrolling in the park, a full program of exploration and mapping was launched, and Davis made particularly important contributions to the work.

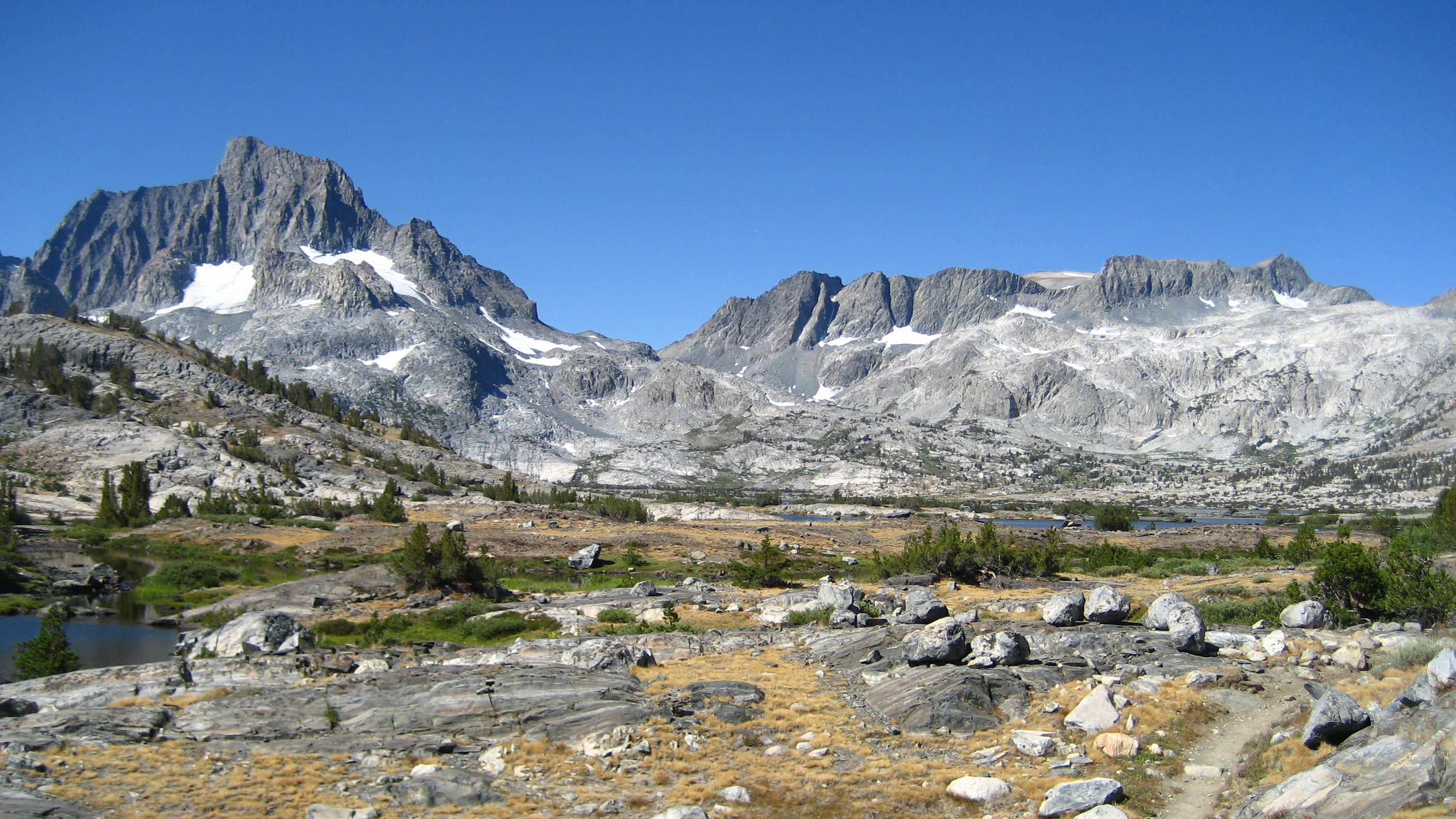
Mount Davis is on the right

Mount Davis, part of the Sierra Nevada Ritter Range in Yosemite is named in honor of Davis, who was with the first troops detailed to guard Yosemite National Park. Davis was the first white man to climb the peak on August 28, 1891. Three years later, in recognition of his services as an explorer and upon the recommendation of the eminent naturalist, John Muir – Davis' lifelong friend – this mighty peak, 12,308 feet high, was christened Davis Mountain by the United States Geological Survey.

A contemporary of Annie Smith Peck, in 1897 he secured leave of absence for three months from the Army, during which he visited Mexico City and he was a member of her party on a record breaking ascent of Mount Popocatépetl, 17,888 feet high.

Davis was cited for gallantry in action during the Santiago de Cuba Campaign, June 22 to July 17, 1898 and was awarded the Silver Star

A heart ailment forced him to retire from active duty in 1909. His rank upon retirement was that of major. He then became professor of military science and tactics and commandant at the New York Military Academy. In February 1918, he was recalled to active duty for World War I, serving successively as colonel and executive officer of the Signal Corps, chief of training in the Air Service, and chief of staff of the Air Corps.

In 1923, Davis was awarded the Army Distinguished Service Medal for is work as Chief of the Schools Section, Division of Military Aeronautics during World War I.

== Personal life and death ==
Milton F. Davis was born in Manterville, Minnesota on November 15, 1864, the son of Evan Richard and Julie Ryder Davis. The family moved to a ranch in Polk County, Oregon in 1878. Milton Davis attended the University of Oregon for two years and in 1886 was appointed to West Point after attaining the highest marks in the competitive examination. He graduated with honors in 1890.

He married Blanche Bates in 1894 and in June 1895 he filed suit to obtain a divorce as three months after their wedding she deserted him and returned to the stage.

On October 6, 1898, he married Bessie Aiken Hall at Highland Park, Illinois. At the time of their wedding he was stationed at Fort Sheridan. They had two daughters and a son.

Davis died on May 31, 1938 and is buried at the US Military Academy in West Point, New York.
