= Mount Davis (California) =

Mountain in Sierra Nevada, California, US

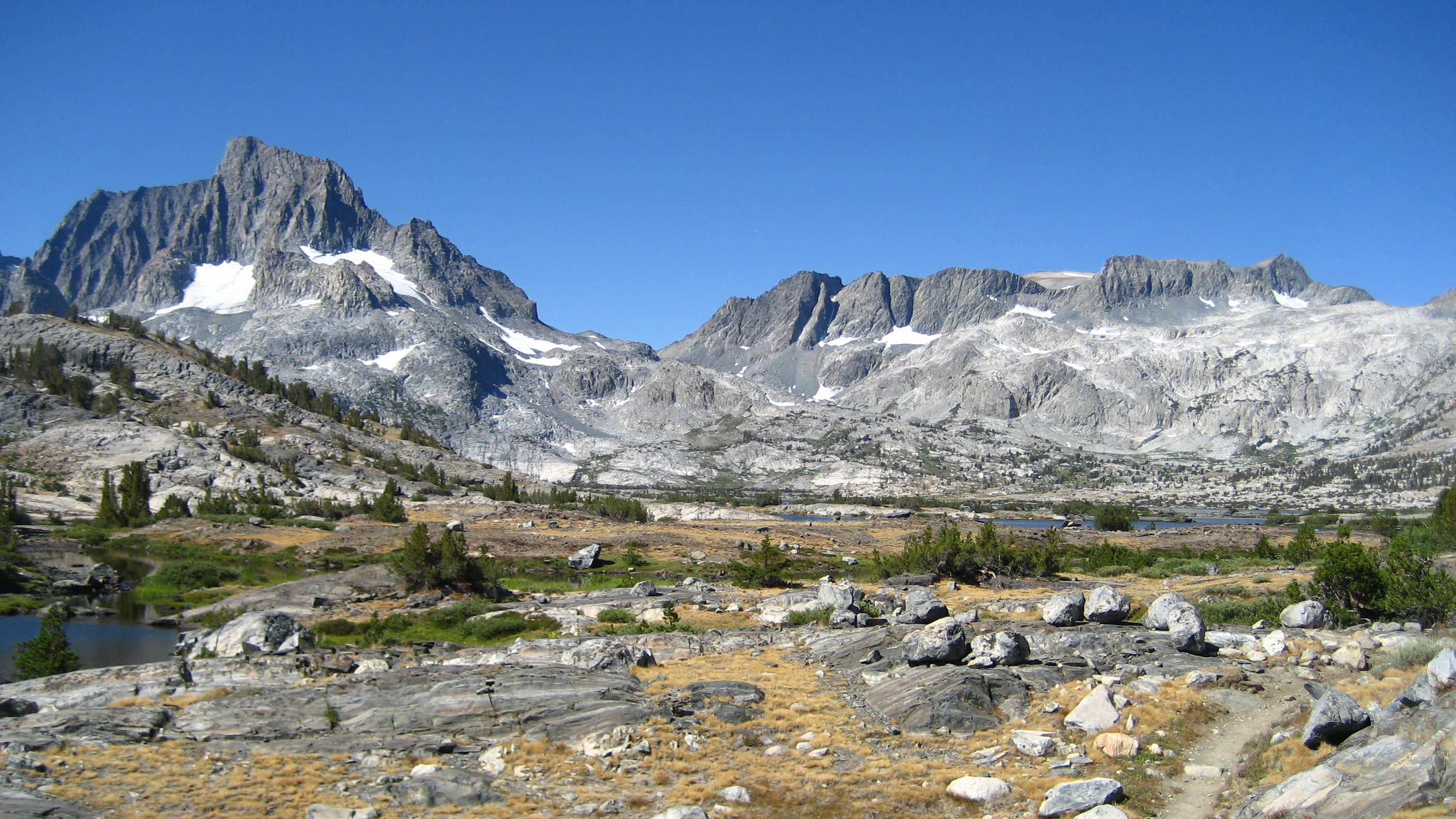
- Mount Davis is the peak on the right

Highest point
- Elevation: 12,309 ft (3,752 m) NAVD 88
- Listing: Sierra Peaks Section
- Coordinates: 37°42′53″N 119°13′11″W

Geography
- Location within California Location within the United States
- Location: Madera and Mono counties, California, U.S.
- Parent range: Ritter Range, Sierra Nevada
- Topo map: USGS Mount Ritter

Geology
- Rock age: Cretaceous
- Mountain type: Granite

Climbing
- First ascent: 1891 by Milton F. Davis
- Easiest route: Scramble, class 2

Mount Davis is a prominent peak in the Ansel Adams Wilderness on the Inyo National Forest and south of Yosemite National Park. The peak was named in honor of Lieutenant Milton Fennimore Davis, who was with the first troops detailed to guard Yosemite National Park. Davis was the first person to climb the peak.
