= Sunny Days (musical) =

Sunny Days is a musical in three acts with music by Jean Schwartz and both book and lyrics by Clifford Grey and William Carey Duncan. The musical was an adaptation of Grey's earlier stage play A Kiss in a Taxi (1925, produced by A. H. Woods) which was in turn adapted from Maurice Hennequin and Pierre Veber's Le Monsieur de cinq heures (1924, Théâtre du Palais-Royal). The work premiered at Broadway's Imperial Theatre on February 8, 1928. It ran there for a total of 101 performances; closing on May 5, 1928. The cast included Jeanette MacDonald as Ginette Bertin, Frank McIntyre as Leon Dorsay, Billy B. Van as Rudolph Max, Lynne Overman as Maurice Vane, Rosalie Claire as Angele Larue, and Audrey Maple as Madame Dorsay.
