= James Forbes (playwright) =

Canadian playwright and screenwriter

James Forbes (September 2, 1871 – May 26, 1938) was a Canadian playwright who worked as a Hollywood film screenwriter. The Chorus Lady and The Famous Mrs. Fair were his best known plays.

== Biography ==
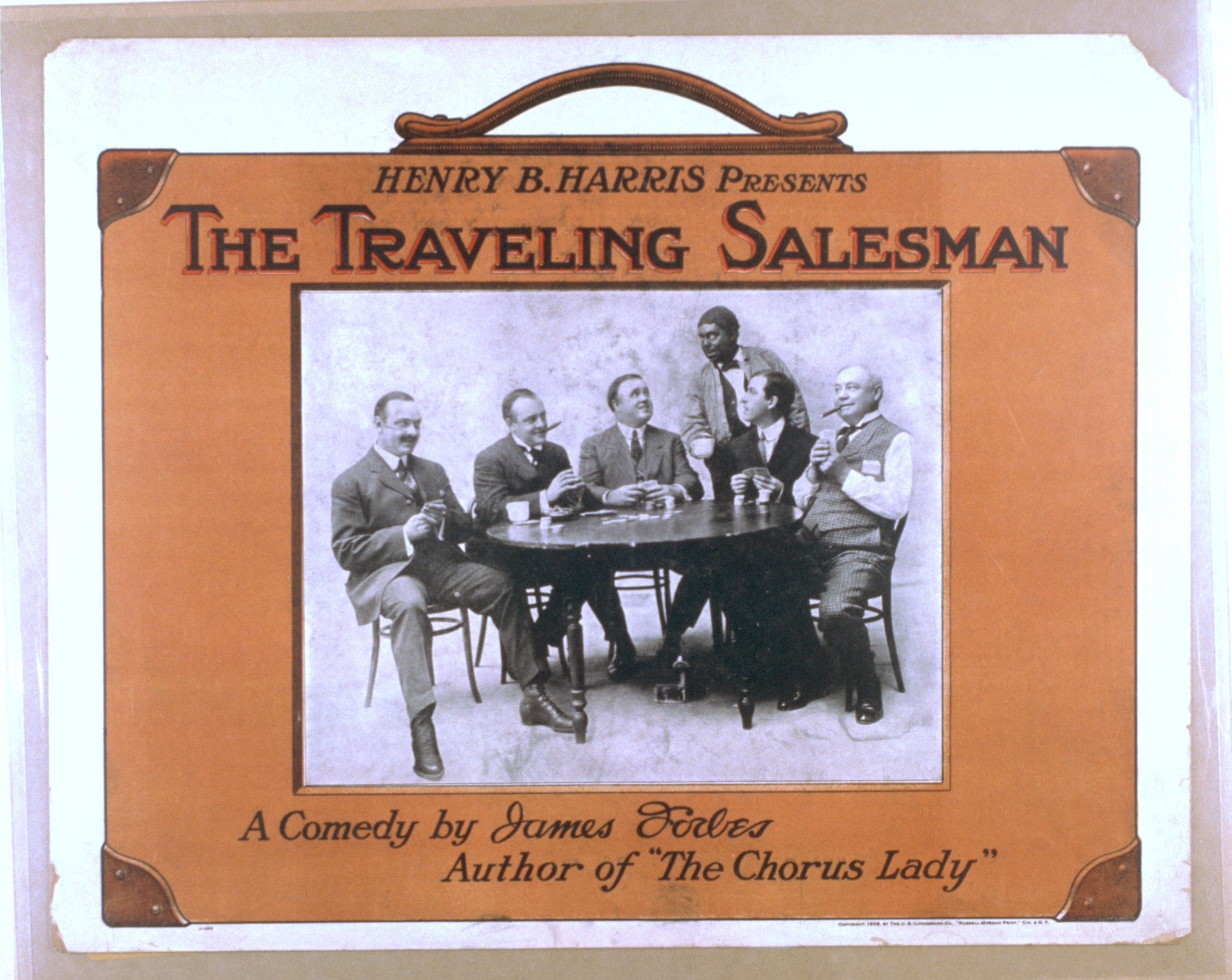
Poster for the Broadway production of The Traveling Salesman (1908), which Forbes wrote and directed

Of Scottish ancestry, Forbes was born September 2, 1871, in Salem, Centre Wellington, Ontario, and he received his education from the College Institute of Galt, Ontario. Becoming a naturalized citizen of the United States in 1892, he had already begun his career as an actor in Chicago in 1891. Early in 1897, he accepted the position of drama critic for the Pittsburgh Dispatch. In 1897, he became the assistant drama editor of the New York World and in 1898 he accepted the position of business manager for Henry W. Savage's Castle Square Opera Company. In 1901, he became the assistant manager of the newly established Henry B. Harris theatrical enterprises. Before turning to play-writing, Forbes published several short stories, which were written entirely in dialogue. In 1904, he adapted one of his stories into a one-act vaudeville sketch entitled The Chorus Lady. Created for Rose Stahl, an actress with whom Forbes had worked, the sketch was very successful in New York, and it then had a successful tour in the United States and England. Forbes expanded the sketch into a full-length comedy, and the 1906 production, again with Rose Stahl, had such great success that Forbes's entree into play-writing was insured. He continued to write plays, including several social comedies, and during the next twenty years he carved himself a niche as a highly acclaimed and popular playwright.

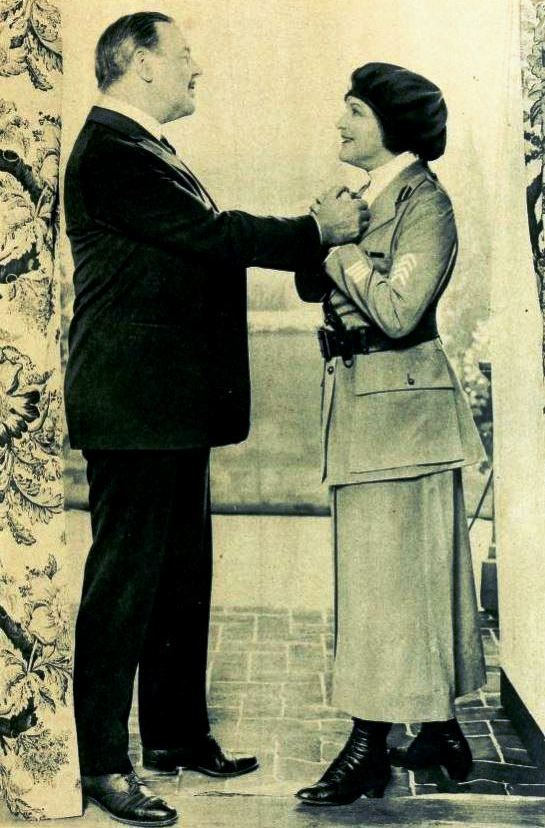
Henry Miller and Blanche Bates in The Famous Mrs. Fair (1919)

Forbes achieved his greatest success in 1919 with The Famous Mrs. Fair, a social comedy dealing with the adjustments a woman faces upon returning home from her work in the war effort in France during World War I. He scored other successes commercially and critically, but his interest and abilities in other aspects of theatre kept him from devoting all his time to writing. He also directed plays, mostly his own, but others as well, and tried his hand at producing. In the 1920s and early 1930s, his two main interests, writing and directing, led him to Hollywood, where he either wrote the screenplays for or directed the dialogue for a number of MGM films. Five of his own plays were made into movies. Forbes also combined latent administrative talent with his theatrical interests in aiding in the formulation of the Over There Theatre League during World War I to entertain American forces overseas and organizing and directing a stock acting company under the auspices of the League which toured bases in France. He subsequently aided in the founding of the Dramatists' Guild of the Authors' League of America and joined with fellow playwrights to form a producing organization called the Dramatists' Theatre, Inc.

In the 1920s, he was lured to Hollywood as a screenwriter for Roscoe "Fatty" Arbuckle and Norma Shearer, for whom he also served as a voice coach. Even though he was Canadian-born and -educated, his plays were based on themes and characters wholly indigenous to the United States. He was keenly observant of issues and trends between 1905 and 1929. Interested in the continued movement toward urbanization, he often contrasted small-town and city life and satirized concurrent social climbing. Reflecting the fomentation in the area of women's rights, he wrote several plays dealing with this issue.

Forbes married Ada Eugenie Fischer (1876–1938) on September 21, 1901. They had a son, Anthony Henry Forbes (1910–1999). Forbes worked with theatrical producer Henry B. Harris and occasionally travelled to Europe with him on business. On July 3, 1908, Forbes, Harris and their wives, Ada and Irene, arrived in New York on the ocean liner, the RMS Baltic, after one such trip.

Forbes died while in Germany in 1938.

== Playwright/screenwriter ==
- The Chorus Lady (play) Savoy Theatre (1906) starring Rose Stahl; screenwriter for film of the same name in 1915
- The Traveling Salesman (1908) (play)
- The Show Shop (1914) (play) Hudson Theatre, starring Douglas Fairbanks
- The Commuters (1915) (play)
- The Traveling Salesman (1916) (film)
- The Famous Mrs. Fair (1919) (play) Henry Miller Theatre, starring Henry Miller (adapted to film of the same name in 1923)
- The Traveling Salesman (1921 film) starring Roscoe Arbuckle
- Their Own Desire (1929 film) (dialogue adaptation), starring Norma Shearer (best actress nomination) and Robert Montgomery
- Inspiration (1931) (adaptation) (uncredited) starring Greta Garbo and Robert Montgomery
- Bachelor's Affairs (1932) (play title Precious) starring Adolphe Menjou

== Filmography ==
- Their Own Desire (1929) (stage director)
