= The Traveling Salesman (1916 film) =

1916 film by Joseph Kaufman

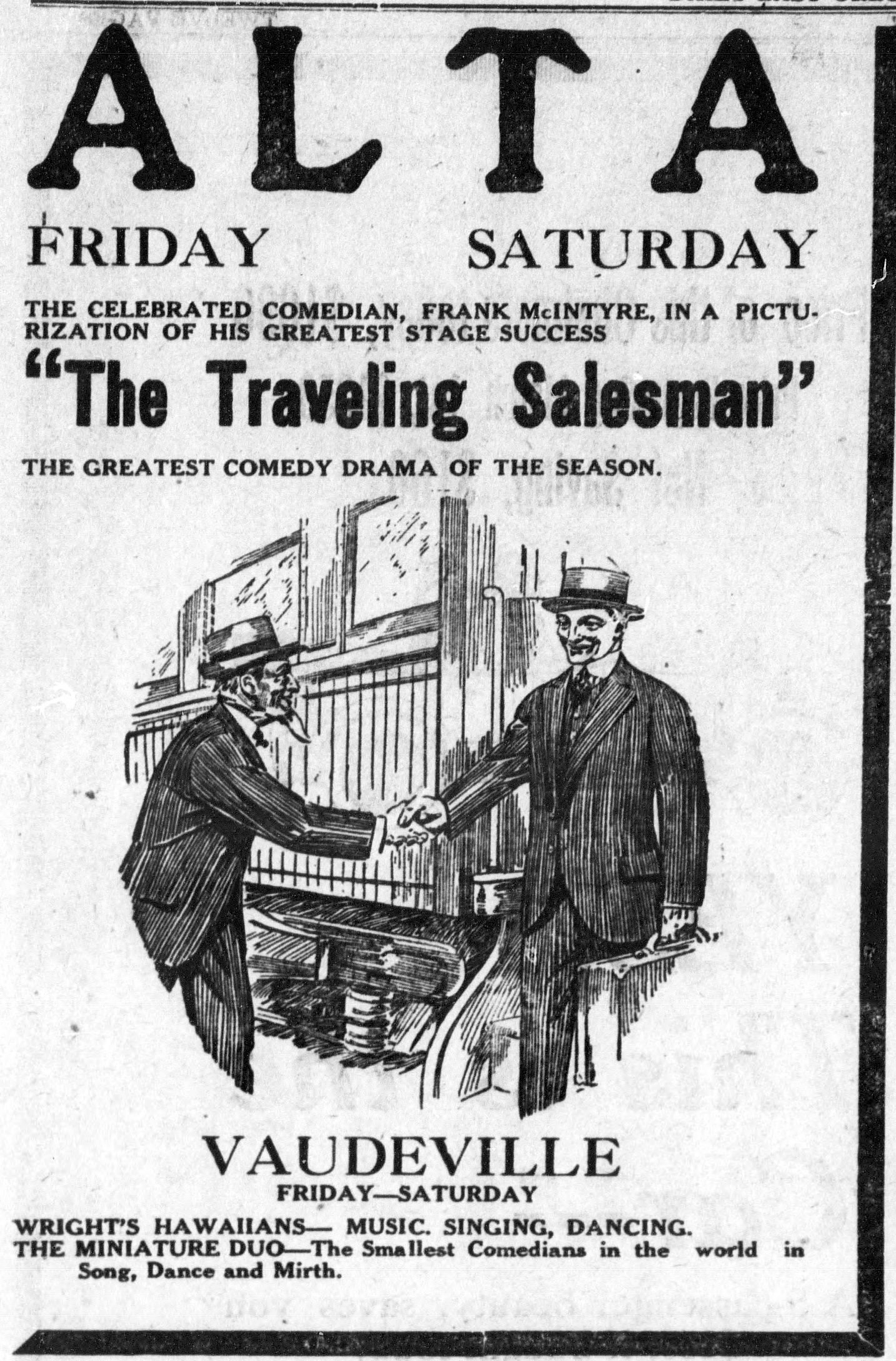
- Newspaper advertisement
- Directed by: Joseph Kaufman
- Screenplay by: James Forbes
- Based on: The Traveling Salesman (play) by James Forbes
- Produced by: Daniel Frohman
- Starring: Frank McIntyre; Doris Kenyon; Harry Northrup; Russell Bassett; Julia Stuart; Harry Blakemore
- Cinematography: Karl Brown; Larry Williams
- Production company: Famous Players Film Company
- Distributed by: Paramount Pictures
- Release date: December 17, 1916
- Running time: 50 minutes
- Country: United States
- Language: Silent (English intertitles)

The Traveling Salesman is a 1916 American silent comedy film directed by Joseph Kaufman, written by James Forbes, and starring Frank McIntyre, Doris Kenyon, Harry Northrup, Russell Bassett, Julia Stuart, and Harry Blakemore. It was released on December 17, 1916, by Paramount Pictures.

== Premise ==
A man traveling home for Christmas gets stuck in a small town and finds romance with a woman operating the telegraph.

== Cast ==
- Frank McIntyre as Bob Blake
- Doris Kenyon as Beth Elliot
- Harry Northrup as Franklin Royce
- Russell Bassett as Martin Drury
- Julia Stuart as Mrs. Babbitt
- Harry Blakemore as Julius
- James O'Neill Jr. as Watts

== Preservation ==
With no prints of The Traveling Salesman located in any film archives, it is a lost film.
