= Rose Stahl =

American actress (1868–1955)

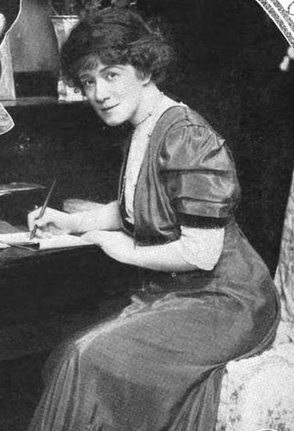
- Stahl in Hampton Magazine, 1911
- Born: Rosalie Stahl; October 29, 1868; Montreal, Quebec, Canada
- Died: July 16, 1955 (aged 86); Queens, New York, U.S.A.
- Occupation: Actor
- Spouse(s): E.P. Sullivan (divorced); William Bonelli (his death)

Rose Stahl (October 29, 1868 – July 16, 1955), born Rosalie Stahl, was a Canadian-born American stage actress.

== Early life ==
Her father was Col. Ernest Karl Stahl, a Prussian-born newspaperman who was drama and music critic for the Chicago InterOcean and her mother Catherine McDonald was born in Canada to a Scottish father and Irish mother.

Rosalie Stahl was born in Montreal and spent her formative years in Chicago, where her father worked. She later moved to Trenton, New Jersey when her father became editor of the Trenton Herald. Her father, a widower, died in 1921 in a hospital in New York City at the age of 77, survived by Stahl, her sister and her three brothers.

== Career ==
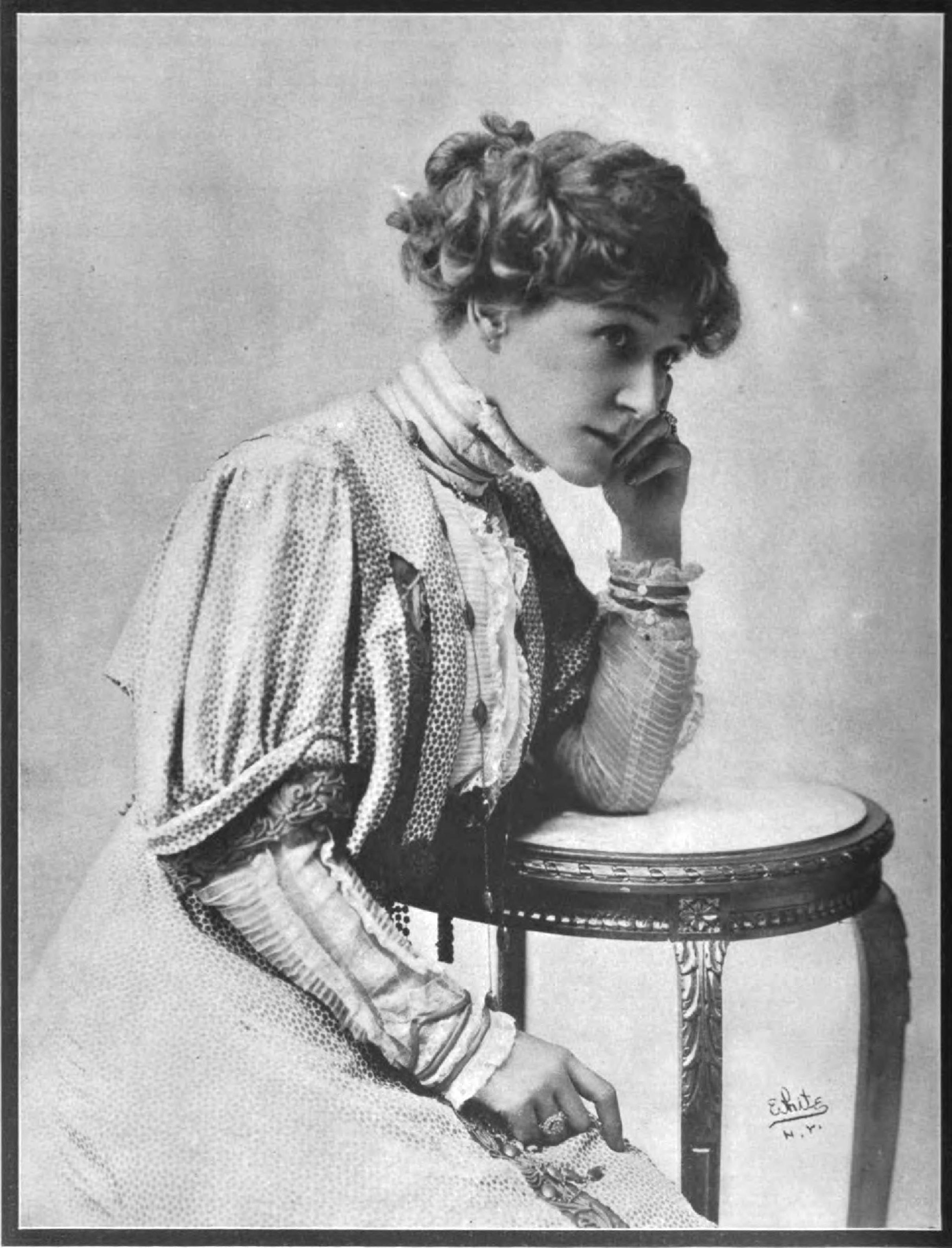
New York Star, 1908

She made her debut in Philadelphia in 1887, toured with Daniel E. Bandmann in 1888 and appeared in New York City in 1897. In 1902–1903, she starred as Janice Meredith in a touring version of the play of the same name. She first appeared in her role of Patricia O'Brien in 1904 in the sketch titled The Chorus Girl, which she carried to London in 1906, and she reappeared in New York in the revised four-act play The Chorus Lady, in which she made a sensation.

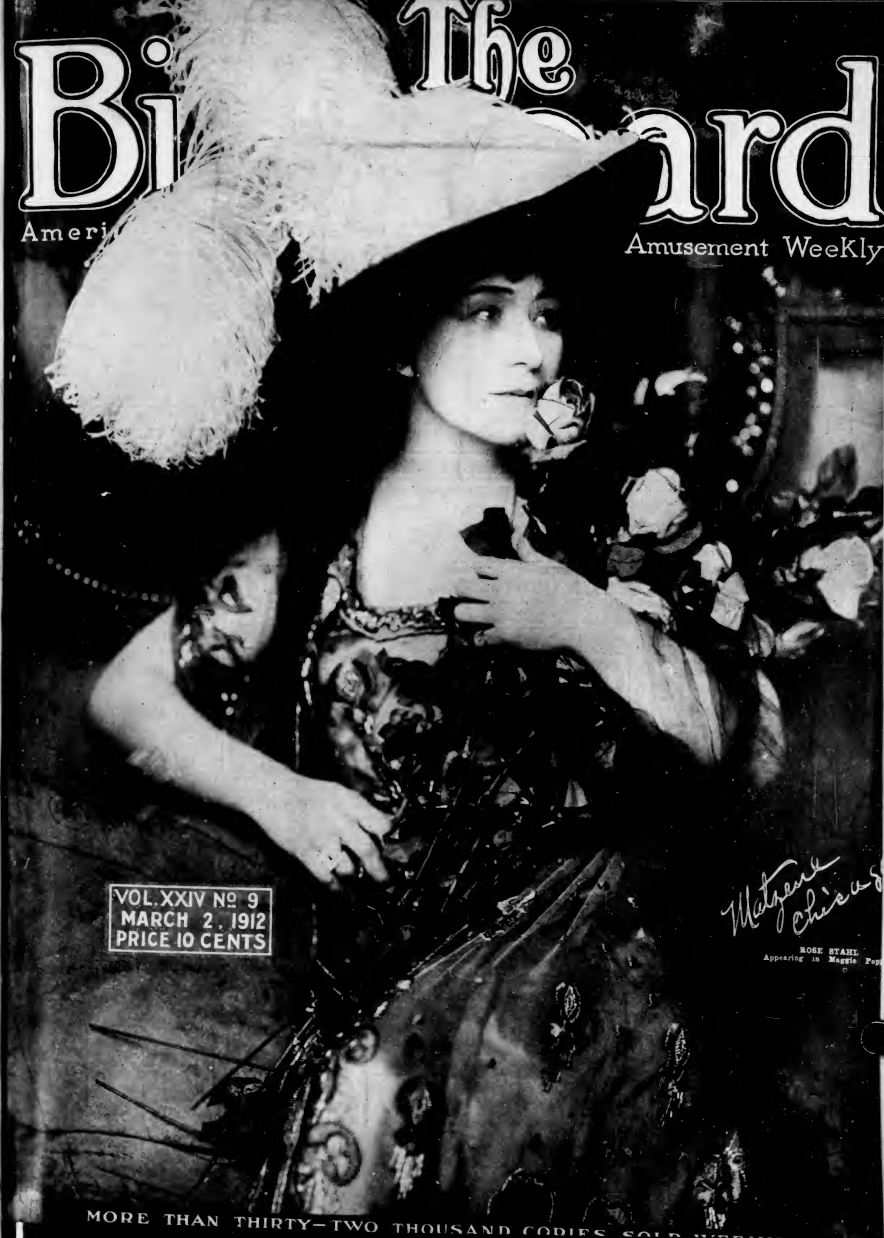
Stahl on the cover of The Billboard, 1912

She had until this time remained largely unknown to the theatre watching public, yet by 1907 had "jumped to the front in the theatrical firmament" and drewcomparisons with David Warfield. She appeared in Lexington, Kentucky for the first time toward the end of 1907, where she was described as a "theatrical star of the first magnitude". Following her performances in The Chorus Lady, she was held in high regard by critics, describing her as "a comedienne with an exquisite sense of humor" while praising her naturalness in acting. Afterward, she played in Maggie Pepper (1911), which critic Percy Hammond writing for the Chicago Tribune did not consider a good play nor entertainment, yet believed the inclusion of Stahl, who played her role "most appealingly", made it a "diversion of no unwholesome type". In 1914, she played the role of Lucille Higgins in A Perfect Lady; in this play, she received an encore with the Reading Times writing that "no one on the stage has quite the plaintive voice that is so characteristic to this great actress", noting that she was not taken seriously a decade prior.

As with many turn of the century stage stars, Stahl showed no interest in the new medium of movies when the fledgling studios came to recruit stage stars around 1912. Like David Warfield, she starred in a handful of plays, became famous for them, and played them for many years.

== Personal life ==
Stahl was married twice. First to E.P. Sullivan, an actor famous for starring in the hugely popular play and later (1916) film The Black Crook; they divorced in the mid-1890s.

Her second husband was William Bonelli, an actor whom she wed on October 17, 1895 in Hudson, New Jersey. This marriage lasted until Bonelli's death. She bore no children in either marriage.

== Note ==
In the 1980 film Somewhere in Time, Christopher Reeve played a journalist researching an Edwardian actress in the library of a large hotel. Reeve pulls out a cache of photos and one of the photos shows a child standing holding a doll. The child is Stahl; the same photo appears in Stahl's biographical entry in Daniel Blum's 1954 edition of Great Stars of the American Stage.
