= Frank McIntyre (actor) =

American actor (1879–1949)

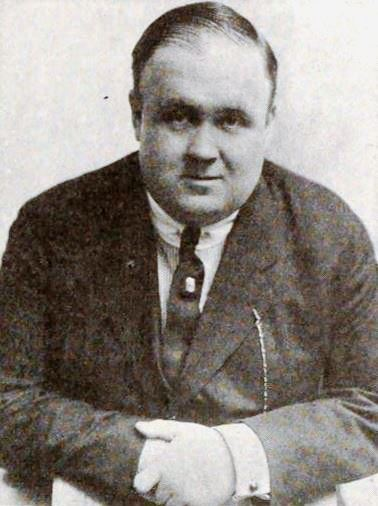
Frank McIntyre

Frank McIntyre (25 February 1879, Ann Arbor, Michigan – 9 June 1949, Ann Arbor) was an American actor of stage and screen. He was the son of William H. McIntyre, a merchant, and his wife Sarah McIntyre (née Maloney). He starred in the silent films The Traveling Salesman (1916, as Bob Blake) and Too Fat to Fight (1918, as Norman 'Dimples' Dalrymple). He had leading roles in numerous plays and musicals on Broadway from 1902 to 1929; including the roles of Alphonse Bouchotte in Oh! Oh! Delphine (1912) and Leon Dorsay in Sunny Days (1928). He also starred in the revue The Greenwich Village Follies of 1925.
