= Blanche Bates =

American actress (1873–1941)

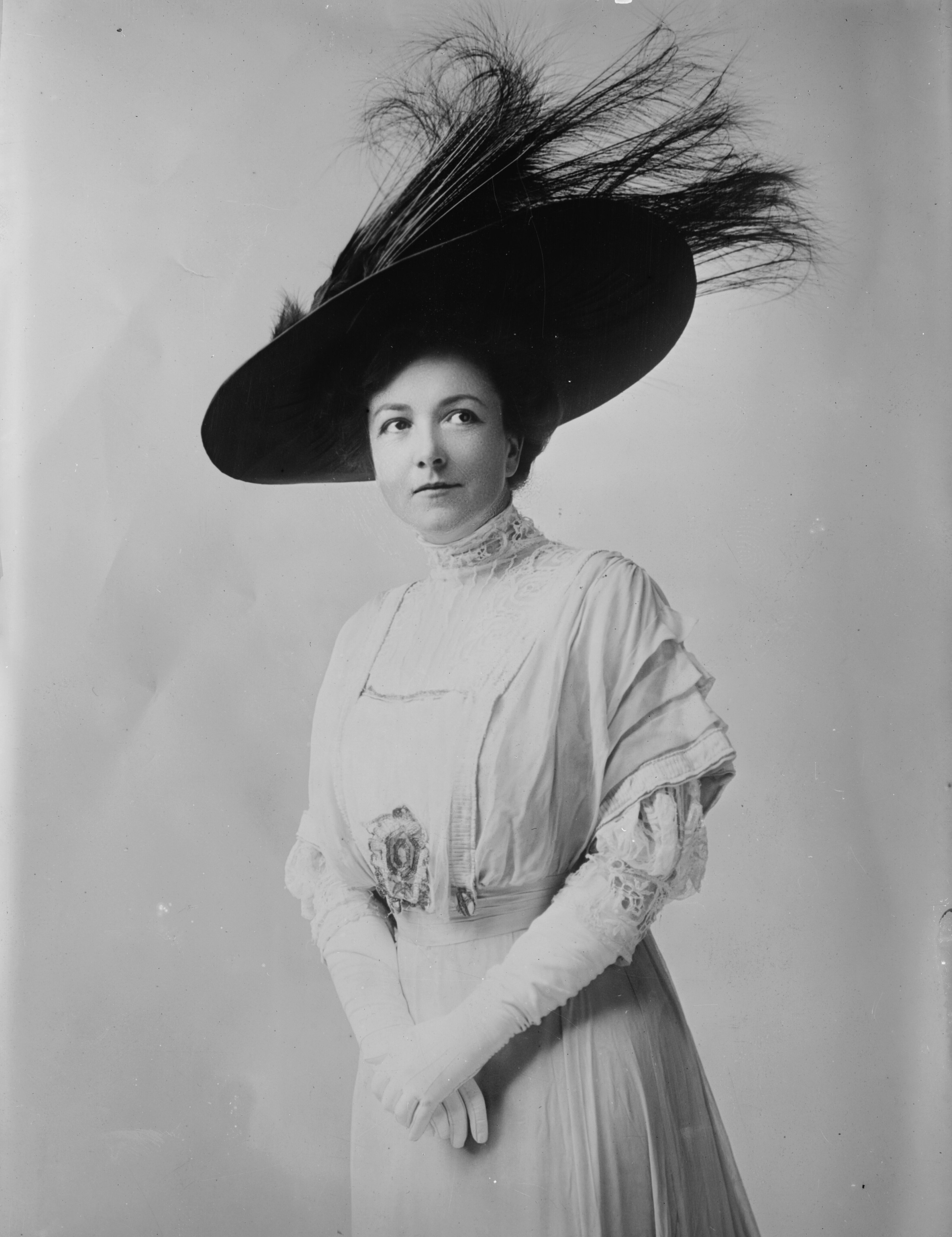
- Blanche Bates as "The Fighting Hope", date unknown
- Born: August 25, 1873; Portland, Oregon, U.S.
- Died: December 25, 1941 (aged 68); San Francisco, California, U.S.
- Resting place: Cypress Lawn Memorial Park
- Occupations: Stage, film actress
- Spouses: Milton F. Davis (1894–95); George Creel(1912–her death)
- Children: 2

Blanche Bates (August 25, 1873 – December 25, 1941) was an American actress.

== Early years ==
Bates was born in Portland, Oregon, while her parents (both of whom were actors) were on a road tour. As an infant, she traveled with them on a tour of Australia before they returned to live in San Francisco. When Bates was a girl, she wanted to be a teacher, a goal that she achieved by becoming a kindergarten teacher in San Francisco. Her career changed, however, after she took a small part in a Stockwell Stock Company production in which her mother was appearing in San Francisco.

== Career ==
Bates made her début in San Francisco in a benefit performance of Brander Matthews's This Picture and That. Among her early successes were her Mrs. Hillary in The Senator, Phyllis in The Charity Ball, and Nora in A Doll's House. She joined Daly's company in 1898 and, the next year at Daly's Theatre in New York, played Mirtza in The Great Ruby.

For the summer of 1900 Bates did a special engagement at the Elitch Theatre, in Denver, Colorado. Mary Elitch stated that "Very special inducements were made to tempt the star from the attractions of New York, and she came to me with ten trunks full of beautiful gowns and gorgeous costumes for the characters she was to portray." Her first performance was in The Dancing Girl, which was followed by Augustin Daly's The Last Word. Later in the summer she performed as Rosalind in As You Like It. For this production "the back of the building was removed so that the stage extended out beneath the trees."

In 1900 she originated the role of Cho-Cho San in David Belasco's play Madame Butterfly. In 1901 she appeared as Cigarette in Under Two Flags at the Garden Theatre in New York. Thereafter devoting herself to the productions of David Belasco, she won great success in The Darling of the Gods (1902), The Girl of the Golden West (1905), Nobody's Widow (1910) by Avery Hopwood, and after World War I in The Famous Mrs. Fair (1919), and Mrs. Partridge Presents (1925).

Bates retired in 1926, settling with her husband in San Francisco, but she returned to the stage in 1933 in a supporting role in The Lake.

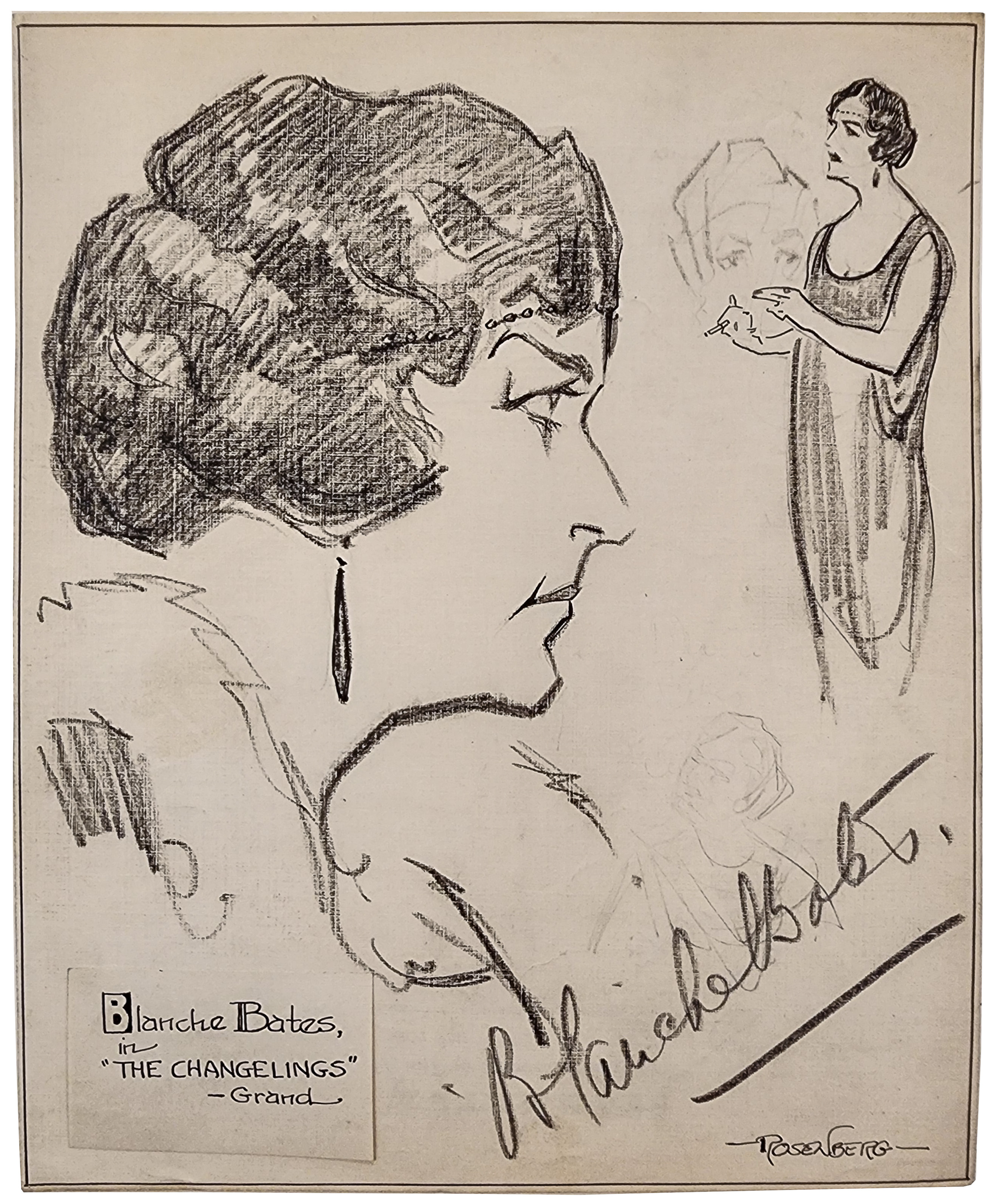
Signed sketch of Blanche Bates by Manuel Rosenberg 1924

In 1902, H.M. Caldwell Company, New York and Boston, published a lavish souvenir book, Blanche Bates Edition of "Under Two Flags" by Ouida, with handsome illustrated covers, and numerous photographs from the play version (written by Paul M. Potter) starring Bates.

== Family and death ==
Born in Portland, Oregon, the daughter of F. M. Bates, Bates was educated in the public schools of San Francisco. In 1894 Bates married Milton F. Davis, at the time a cavalry lieutenant in the U.S. Army, but they divorced four weeks later. On November 28, 1912 she married George Creel, a journalist and politician, and they had two children, a son George Jr. and a daughter Frances.

On December 25, 1941, Bates died in San Francisco. She had had a stroke six months earlier.

== Publications ==
- "Other Holiday Gift-Books", The Publishers' Weekly, Nov. 29, 1902, v.LXII, n.22, whole no. 1609, p. 102.
- Strang, Famous Actresses of the Day in America (Boston, 1899)
