= Prosdocimi =

Prosdocimi is a surname. Notable people with the surname include:

- Alberto Prosdocimi, Italian painter
- Claude Prosdocimi, French football forward and coach
