= Umberto Ongania =

Italian painter (1867–1942)

Umberto Ongania (1867–1942) was an Italian painter, mainly of vedute of his native city.

== Biography ==
Ongania was born in Venice and was the first son of publisher Ferdinando Ongania. He painted in both watercolor and oil. He exhibited in 1887 at Venice, La Porta della Carta, and in 1888 at Bologna, Il Palazzo Ducale di Venezia. He continued to paint until the first decades of the twentieth century.

Ongania was one of the many artists who collaborated in the illustration of a book (edited and published by his father) on the Basilica of San Marco with text by Camillo Boito.

He married Elena Belozerskij, the daughter of Ivan Ivanovic Belozerskij.
