= Alberto Prosdocimi =

Italian painter

Alberto Prosdocimi (September 9, 1852 – 1925) was an Italian painter and manuscript illuminator. He often painted vedute of Venice in pale and bright watercolors, often sold abroad.

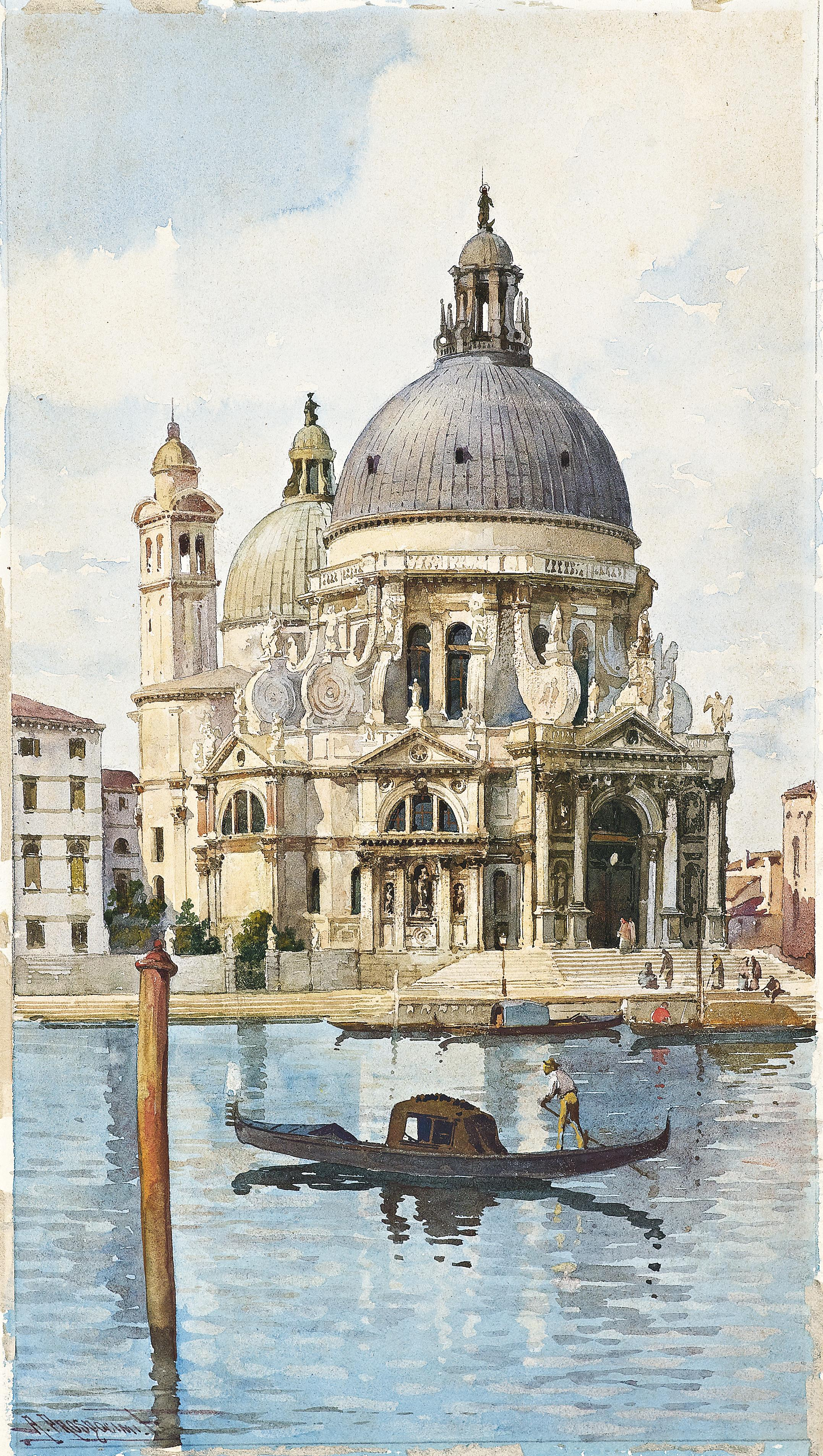
Santa Maria della Salute

== Biography ==
He studied painting at the Accademia of Venice, but also trained in the studio of his father. He often painted in watercolor, but like his father, he was a respected manuscript illuminator. He copied the Grimani Breviary held in the Library of San Marco at Venice.

He completed the diplomas of honor awarded by Florence to their mayor Peruzzi factory. He was commissioned by Queen Margherita to create an illuminated portrait of the Prince of Naples. He also made an elaborately illuminated album by the aristocracy of Padua and Verona as a gift to the Queen. He was engaged to tutor in painting the Princess Hohenzollern-Sigmaringen and of the hereditary Granduchess of Granduchessa Holdemburg. The latter commissioned some watercolors from him.

He was one of the collaborators of a masterwork La basilica di S. Marco illustrata nella storia e nell'arte (1878–93), published by Ferdinando Ongania. Prosdocimi made the drawings of the Basilica that were used in chromolithographs by Ongania.

Gubernatis wrote about Prosdocimi's vedute of The Baptistery:

by regularity of line and perspective, by evidence of light effects, has the mathematical exactness of remembered paintings, but it stands out for revealing very intensely the poetry of the atmosphere, which Prosdocimi profoundly feels without truncating the original feeling; while among the Venetians he has an individuality, calculated and devived from the studies of concepts and technique.

== Gallery ==
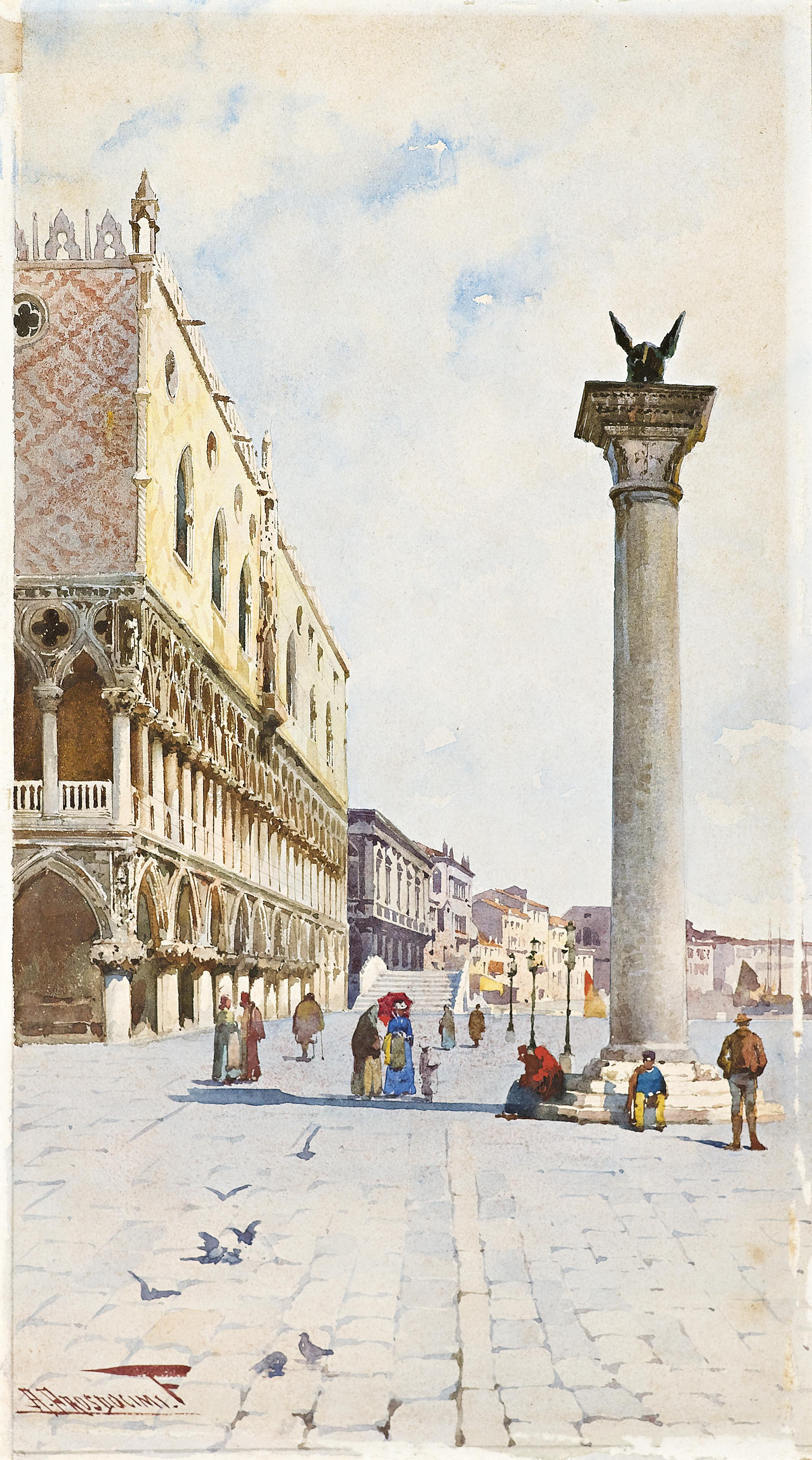
Doge's palace waterfront

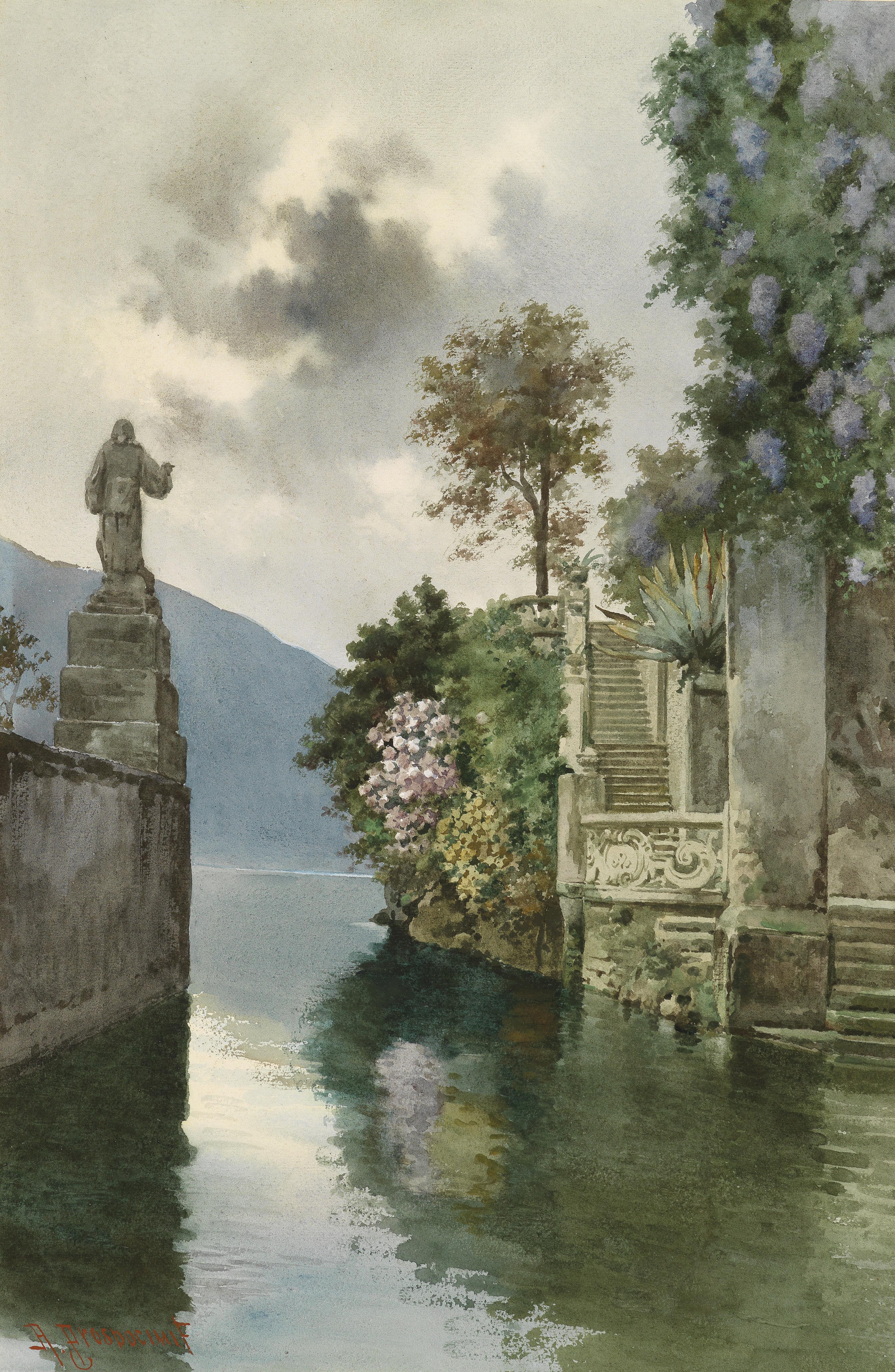
Villa del Balbianello on Lake Como

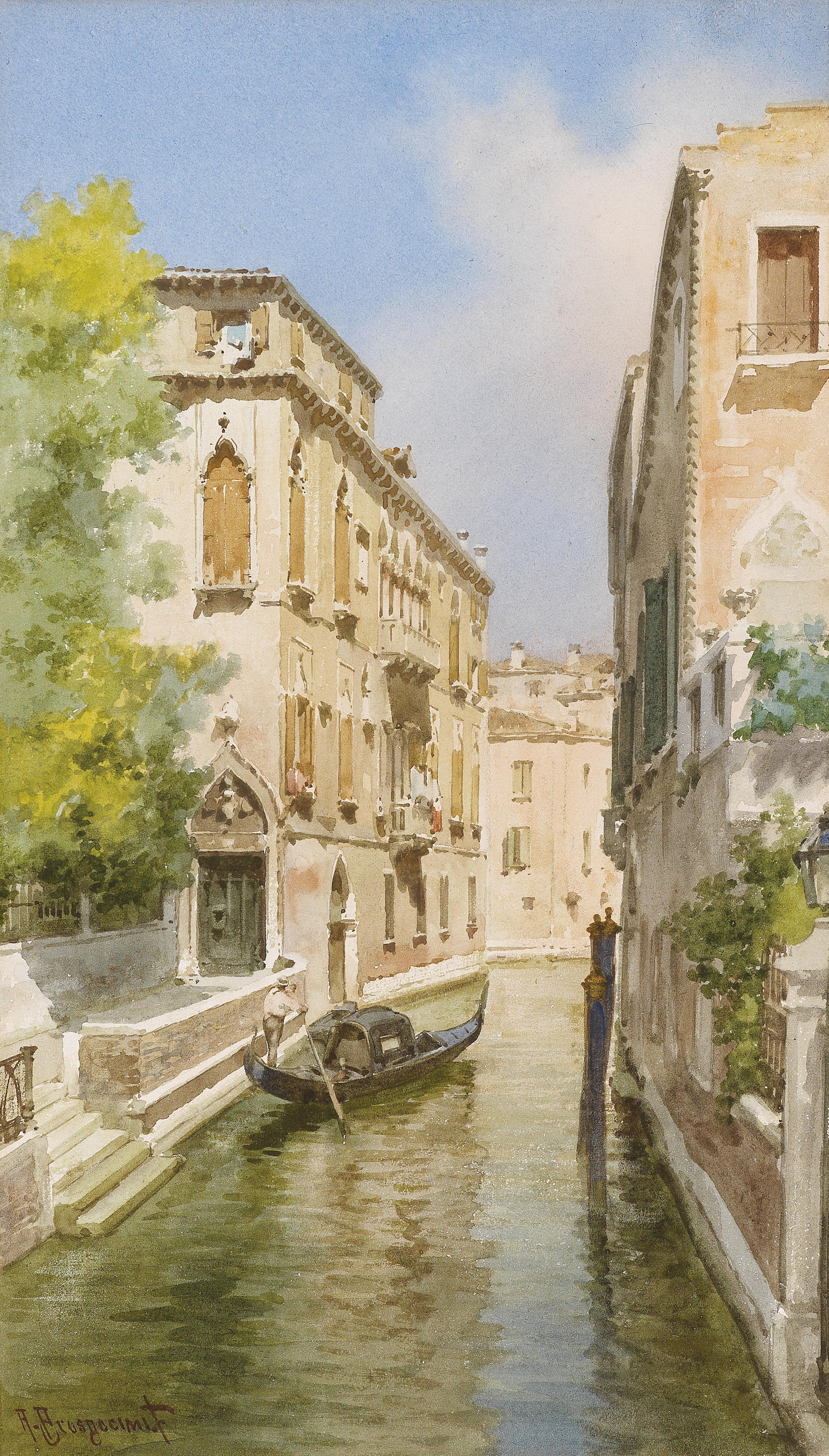
Palazzo Soranzo Van Axel in Venice

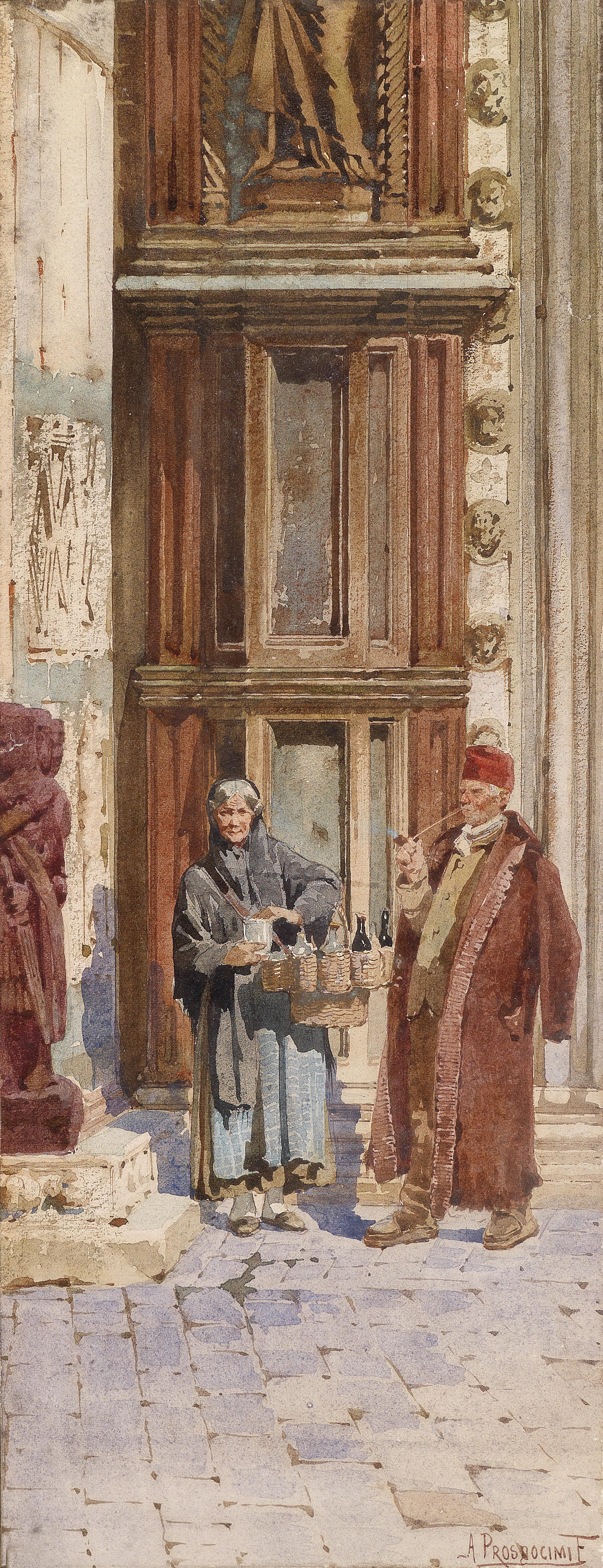
Wine-seller at the Doge's Palace
