= Palazzo Soranzo Van Axel =

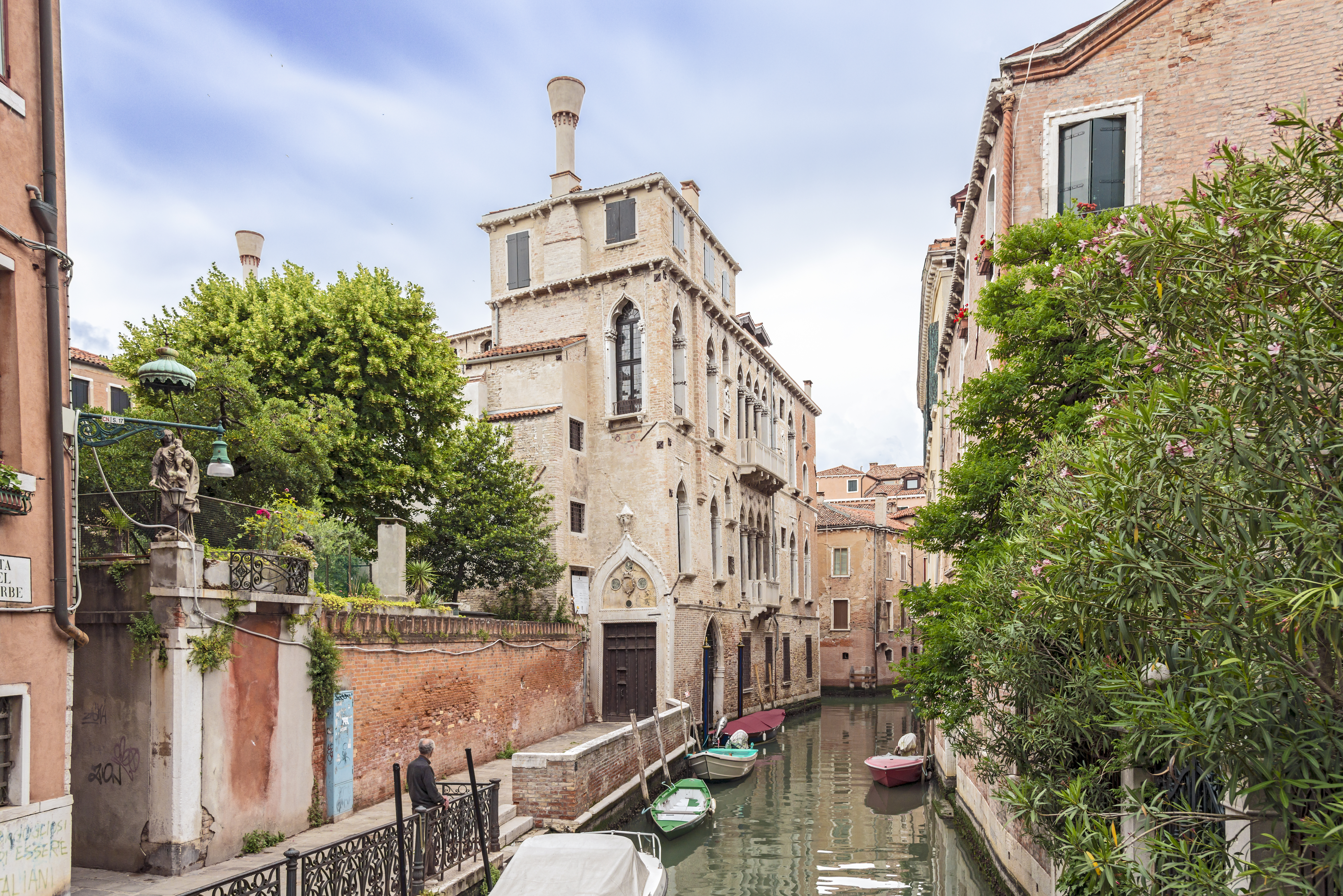
- Palazzo Soranzo Van Axel
- Interactive map of the Palazzo Soranzo Van Axel area

General information
- Type: Residential
- Architectural style: Gothic
- Location: Cannaregio district, Venice, Italy
- Coordinates: 45°26′14.15″N 12°20′29.14″E
- Construction started: 1473
- Construction stopped: 1479

Technical details
- Floor count: 4 levels

Palazzo Soranzo Van Axel is a Gothic palace in Venice, Italy located in the Cannaregio district. The palace locates at the intersection of the Rio de la Panada and the Rio de Ca' Widmann.

== History ==
The palace was erected between 1473 and 1479 for Nicolò Soranzo with material recovered from an ancient Byzantine palace of Gradenigo. It is possible that Soranzo was involved in the construction of the adjacent Church of Santa Maria dei Miracoli. The palazzo then passed to the families of Venier and Sanudo. Finally, in 1652, the palace became the property of the Van Axel, rich merchants from Axel, Netherlands. They were admitted to the Venetian patriciate in 1665.

The building was featured in the 1967 movie The Honey Pot. In recent years, Palazzo Soranzo Van Axel has been used for the Biennale and undergone exterior renovation.

== Architecture ==
The palazzo looks apparently planless. The structure has two noble floors decorated by quadriforas supported by balconies. There are internal courtyards with external staircases. Of particular interest are L-shaped halls (porteghi) because of the double angle view on the intersection of the rivers. Also remarkable is the entrance gate on the Fondamenta de le Erbe, in original wood with bezel and the coat of arms of the Van Axel. A curious part of the building that closes its south part is a few meters wide: built certainly after the rest of the building, it rises above a detachment originally imposed by the Venetian court in a property dispute with the adjoining convent of nuns.

== Gallery ==
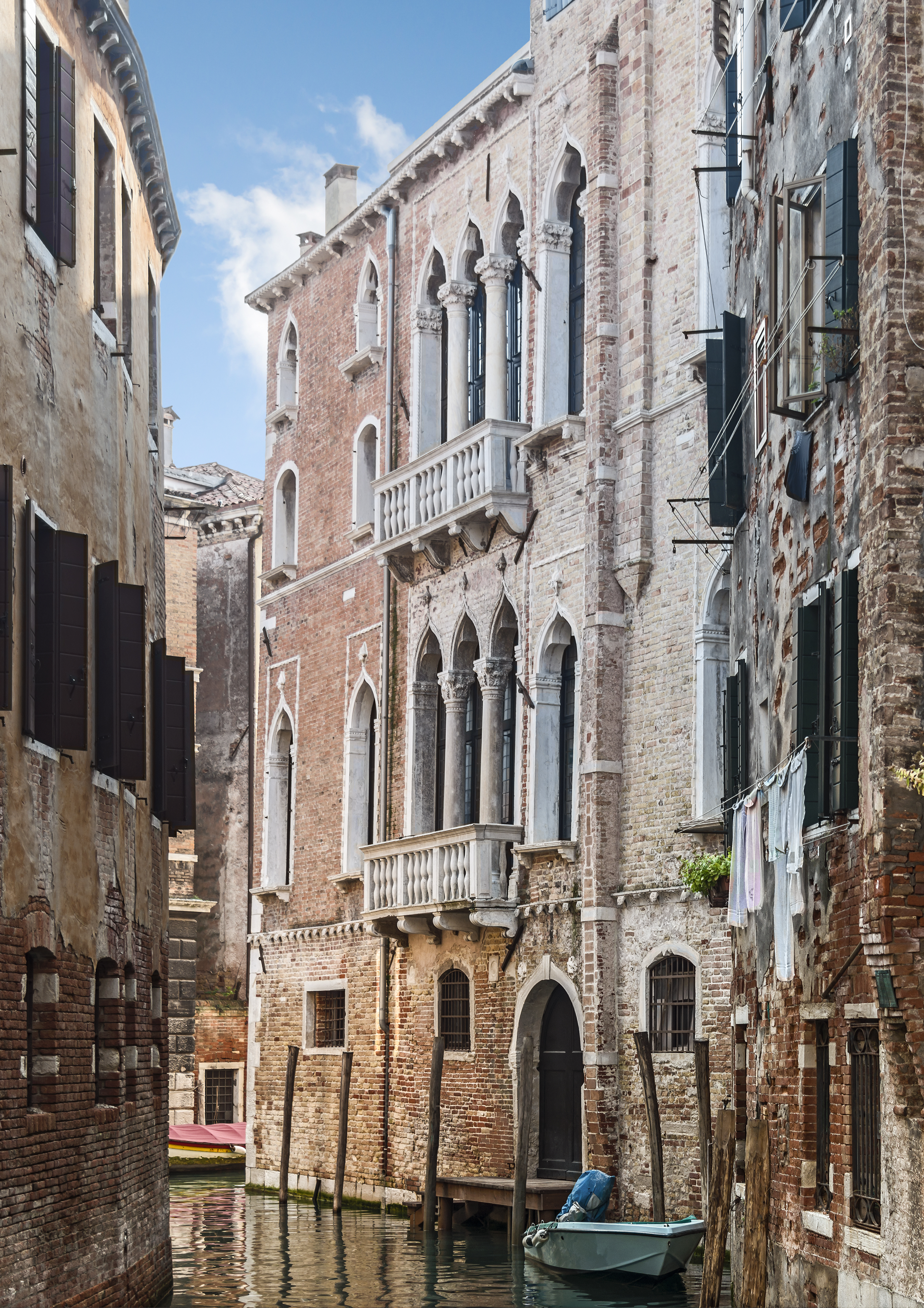
The second facade

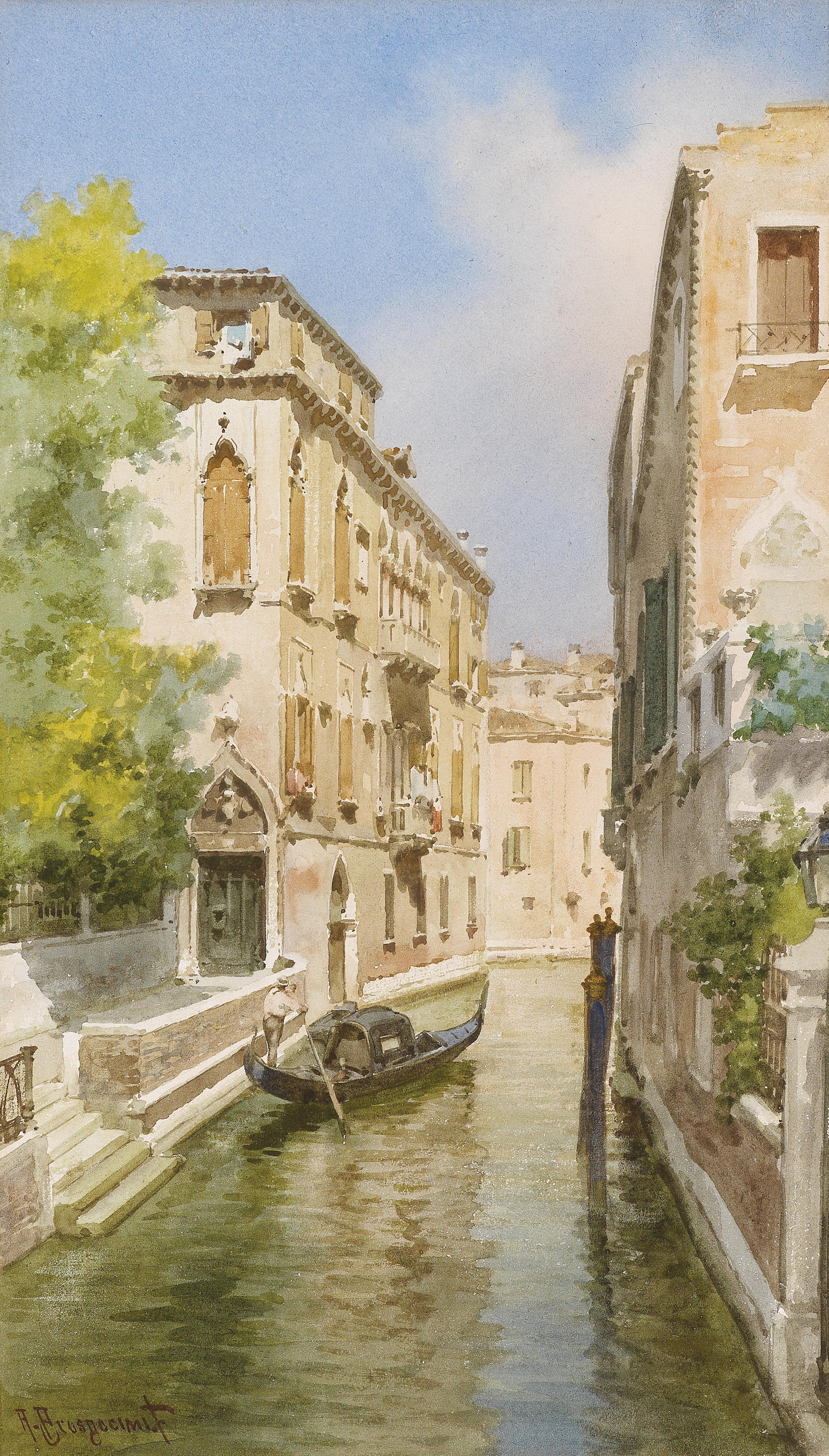
A painting by Alberto Prosdocimi

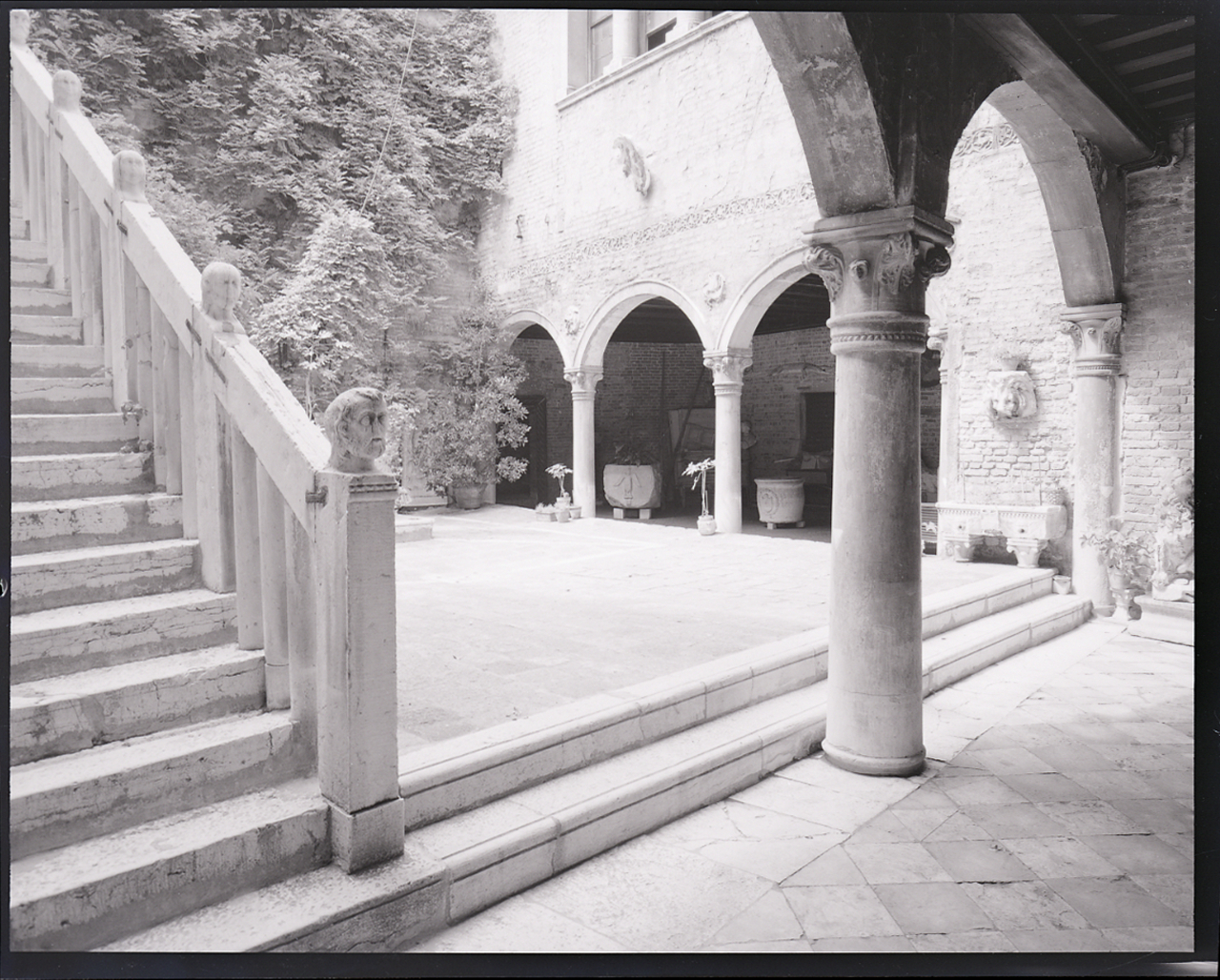
The courtyard, a photo by Paolo Monti

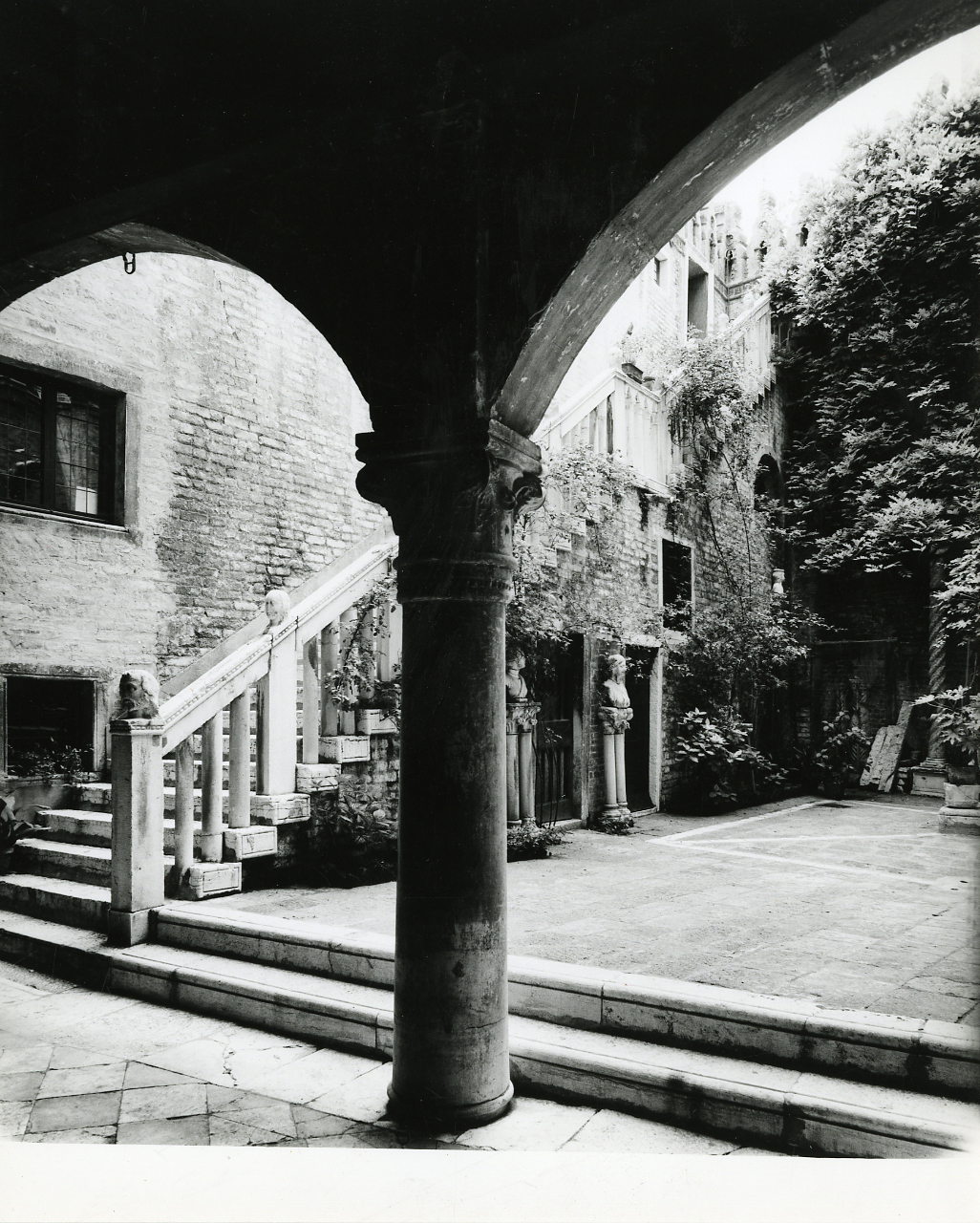
The courtyard, a photo by Paolo Monti

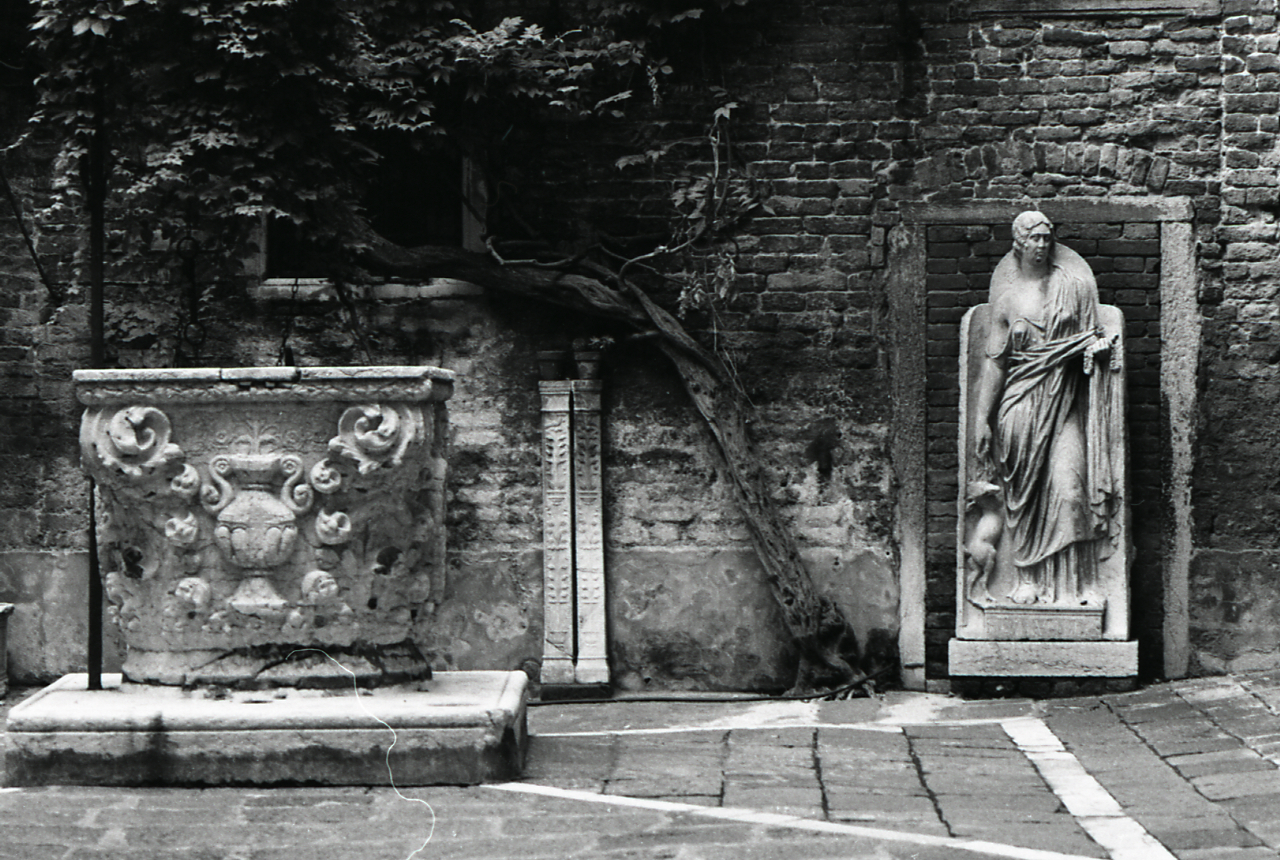
Details of the courtyard, a photo by Paolo Monti

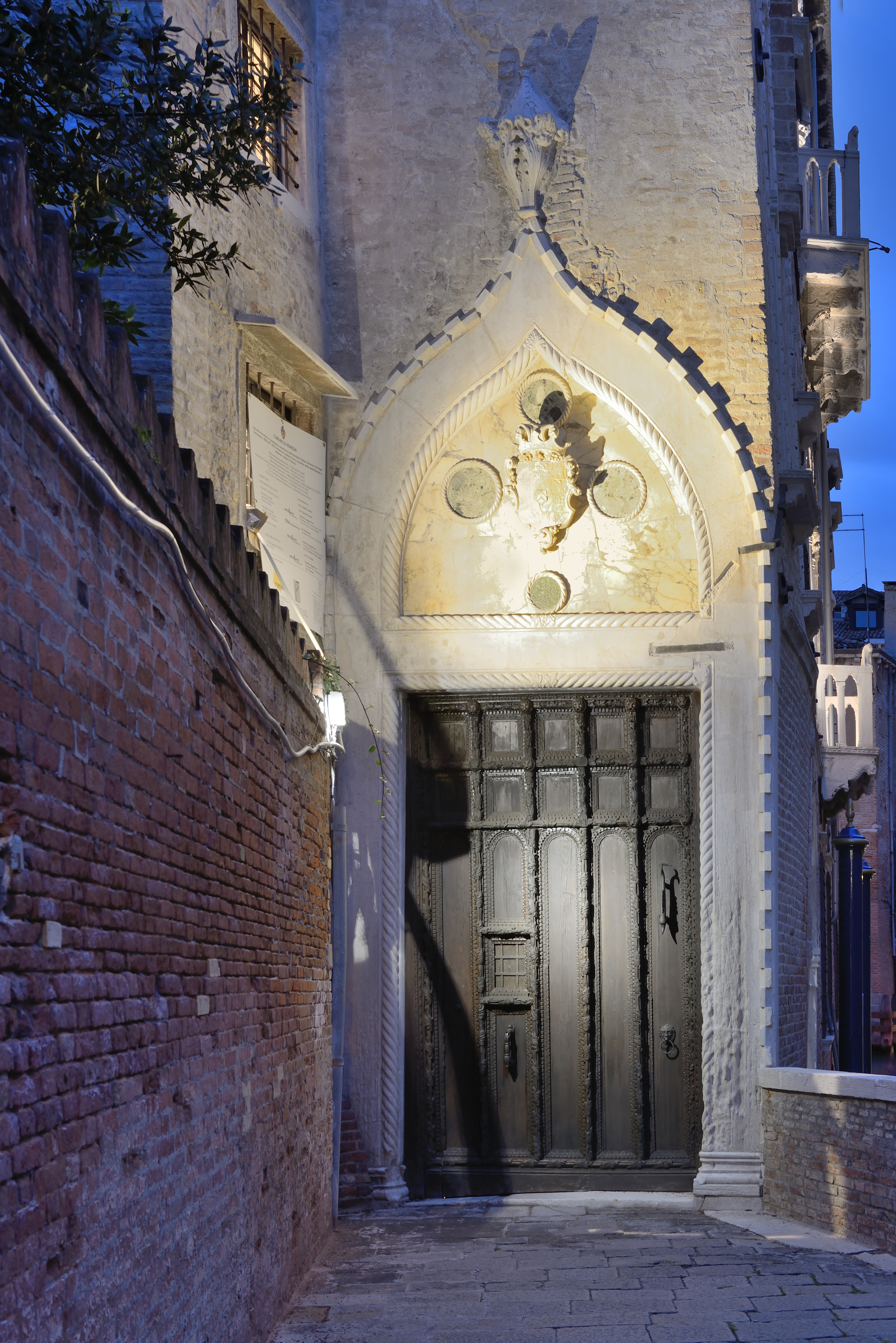
The entrance decorated with the Van Axel coat of arms
