= Ferdinando Ongania =

Italian publisher (1842–1911)

Ferdinando Ongania (18 July 1842 - 20-21 August 1911) was a Venetian publisher and bookseller best known for publishing the monumental book La Basilica San Marco in Venezia. Ongania published more than 170 books, mainly about Venice. He was particularly significant for using the latest photographic techniques to create facsimile editions and reproductions of great Venetian artworks. In particular, his heliographic prints were remarkable for their clarity. He published out of his antique shop and gallery on Piazza San Marco, which catered to an international clientele.
