= Margalo Gillmore =

American actress (1897–1986)

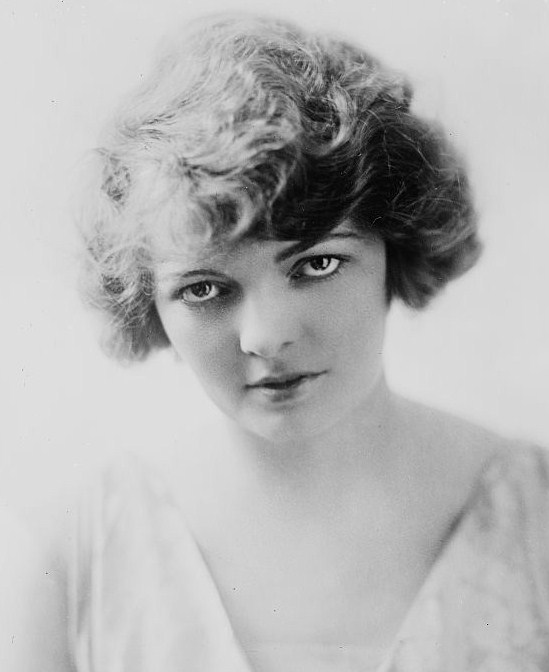
- Born: Margaret Lorraine Gillmore; 31 May 1897; London, England
- Died: 30 June 1986 (aged 89); New York City, U.S.
- Education: American Academy of Dramatic Arts
- Occupation: Actress
- Years active: 1917–1966
- Spouse: Robert Ross (m. 1935; died 1954)
- Parent: Frank Gillmore
- Relatives: Sarah Thorne (great-aunt); Thomas Thorne (great-uncle); George Thorne (great-uncle)

Margaret Lorraine "Margalo" Gillmore (31 May 1897 – 30 June 1986) was an English-born American actress who had a long career as a stage actress on Broadway. She also appeared in films and TV series, mostly in the 1950s and early 1960s.

== Family ==
Born in 1897 in London, England, Gillmore was the daughter of Frank Gillmore, a founder and former president of Actors' Equity, and the actress Laura MacGillivray, and the sister of actress Ruth Gillmore. Her great-aunt was the British actor-manager Sarah Thorne, and her great-uncles were the actors Thomas Thorne and George Thorne. She grew up in Manhattan on West 136th Street.

== Career ==
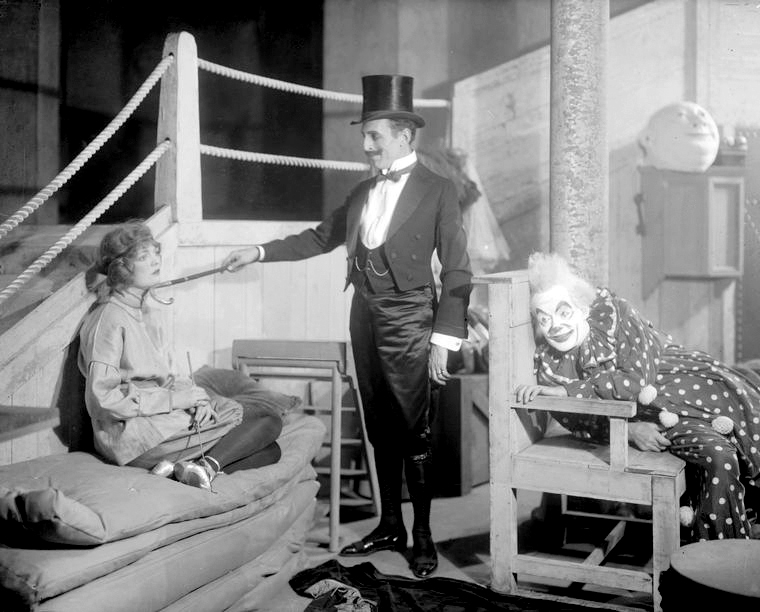
Gillmore, Frank Reicher and Richard Bennett in the Broadway production of He Who Gets Slapped (1922)

A fourth-generation actress on her father's side, Gillmore trained at the American Academy of Dramatic Arts. Her stage acting career stretched from The Scrap of Paper in 1917 through to Noël Coward's musical Sail Away on Broadway in 1961. She was first noticed by the critics in the 1919 play The Famous Mrs. Fair, in which she appeared with Henry Miller and Blanche Bates.

In 1921 she played the tubercular patient Eileen Carmody in Eugene O'Neill's The Straw, and in 1922 she portrayed Consuelo in the United States premiere of Leonid Andreyev's He Who Gets Slapped. For the summer of 1933 Gillmore performed in the Summer stock cast at the Elitch Theatre in Denver, Colorado.

In 1936, she originated the role of Mary Haines in Clare Boothe Luce's play The Women, and in 1945 she originated the role of Kay Thorndyke in the Pulitzer Prize-winning play State of the Union. Gillmore appeared regularly with the Theatre Guild.

Having appeared as an extra in a silent film for the Vitagraph Studios in 1913, aged 16, and in a short, The Home Girl in 1928, Gillmore made her sound-film debut in 1932 in Wayward, but did not appear on screen again until the 1950s in such films as Perfect Strangers (1950), Cause for Alarm! (1951), Woman's World (1954), High Society (1956), Gaby (1956) and Upstairs and Downstairs (1959).

During World War II, Gillmore had a role in the traveling production of The Barretts of Wimpole Street. The production starred much of the original Broadway cast headed by leading actress Katharine Cornell, and directed by Cornell's husband Guthrie McClintic. The play entertained troops in Italy, France and England and reached within a few miles of the front in the Netherlands. The cast made a point of visiting military hospitals every day.

Gillmore played Mrs. Darling in the Broadway and televised versions of Peter Pan starring Mary Martin. She was a member of the famous Algonquin Round Table.

In 1964 she wrote her autobiography Four Flights Up, published by Houghton Mifflin.

== Personal life and death ==
In 1935, Gilmore was married to actor Robert Ross. On 30 June 1986, Gillmore died of cancer, aged 89, in her New York City apartment.

== Filmography ==
Year	Title	Role	Notes
1928	The Home Girl		short film
1932	Wayward	Louisa Daniels	
1950	Perfect Strangers	Isobel Bradford	
1950	The Happy Years	Maude Stover	
1951	Cause for Alarm!	Mrs. Edwards	
1951	The Law and the Lady	Cora Caighn	
1951	Behave Yourself!	Mother	
1951	Elopement	Claire Osborne	
1952	Skirts Ahoy!	Lt. Cmdr. Stauton	
1953	Scandal at Scourie	Alice Hanover	
1954	Woman's World	Mrs. Evelyn Andrews	
1956	Gaby	Mrs. Helen Carrington	
1956	High Society	Mrs. Seth Lord	
1959	Upstairs and Downstairs	Mrs. McGuffey	
1966	The Trouble with Angels	Sister Barbara	
