= Katherine Sproehnle =

American writer

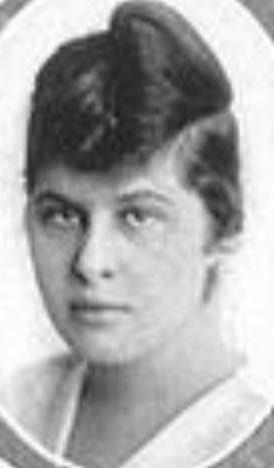
- Katherine Sproehnle, from the 1915 yearbook of the University of Chicago
- Born: September 30, 1894; Chicago
- Died: August 29, 1976 (aged 81); New York City
- Other names: Katherine Rheinstein, Kate Sproehnle
- Occupations: Writer, publicist, journalist
- Spouse: Alfred Rheinstein

Katherine Margaret Sproehnle (September 30, 1894 – August 29, 1976) was an American writer, publicist, and journalist, a contributor to The New Yorker, Woman's Day, Vanity Fair, Mademoiselle, Collier's, Vogue, and The Saturday Evening Post.

== Early life and education ==
Sproehnle was born in Chicago, the daughter of Albert William Sproehnle and Isabel Grace Kuh Sproehnle. Her father and brother were jewelers. Journalist Franklin P. Adams was her cousin. She graduated from the University of Chicago in 1915.

== Career ==
Sproehnle was a reporter for the Chicago Tribune after college. She worked with Edward Bernays in publicity, and at a bookstore owned by Fanny Butcher. After she moved to New York City, she was an occasional guest at the Algonquin Round Table gatherings.

Sproehnle regularly contributed fiction, reviews, and humorous commentary to The New Yorker, from the 1920s into the 1940s, She co-wrote some pieces with Jane Grant, James Thurber, and Robert M. Coates. In the 1940s she was the theatre critic for Mademoiselle magazine. She also wrote for Vogue, Woman's Day, Vanity Fair, Collier's, and The Saturday Evening Post.

== Personal life ==
In 1926, Sproehnle married Alfred Rheinstein, a construction company owner and housing official in New York City. They had three children, including television news producer Frederic Rheinstein. Her husband died in 1974, and she died in 1976, at the age of 81, in New York City. Designer Kate Rheinstein Brodsky and sportscaster Linda Rheinstein are her granddaughters.
