= Alexander Woollcott =

American drama critic and commentator (1887–1943)

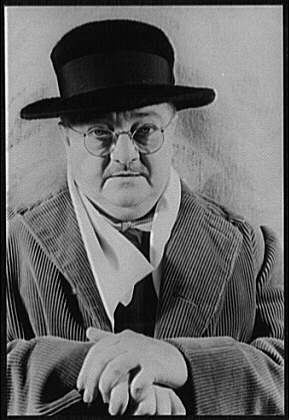
- Woollcott in 1939, photographed by Carl Van Vechten
- Born: Alexander Humphreys Woollcott; January 19, 1887; Colts Neck Township, New Jersey, U.S.
- Died: January 23, 1943 (aged 56); New York City, U.S.
- Resting place: Hamilton College, New York
- Education: Hamilton College
- Occupations: Drama critic; essayist; playwright; editor; actor; raconteur; radio personality
- Relatives: William W. Woollcott (brother)

Alexander Humphreys Woollcott (January 19, 1887 – January 23, 1943) was an American drama critic for The New York Times and The New York Herald, critic and commentator for The New Yorker magazine, a member of the Algonquin Round Table, an occasional actor and playwright, and a prominent radio personality.

Woollcott was the inspiration for two fictional characters. The first was Sheridan Whiteside, the caustic and malingering house-guest in the comedic play The Man Who Came to Dinner (1939) by George S. Kaufman and Moss Hart, later made into a film in 1942. The second was the snobbish and vitriolic columnist Waldo Lydecker in the novel Laura, later made into a film in 1944 in which Lydecker was played by Clifton Webb.

Woollcott was convinced he was the inspiration for his friend Rex Stout's brilliant but eccentric and very portly detective Nero Wolfe, which Stout denied.

== Early life and education ==
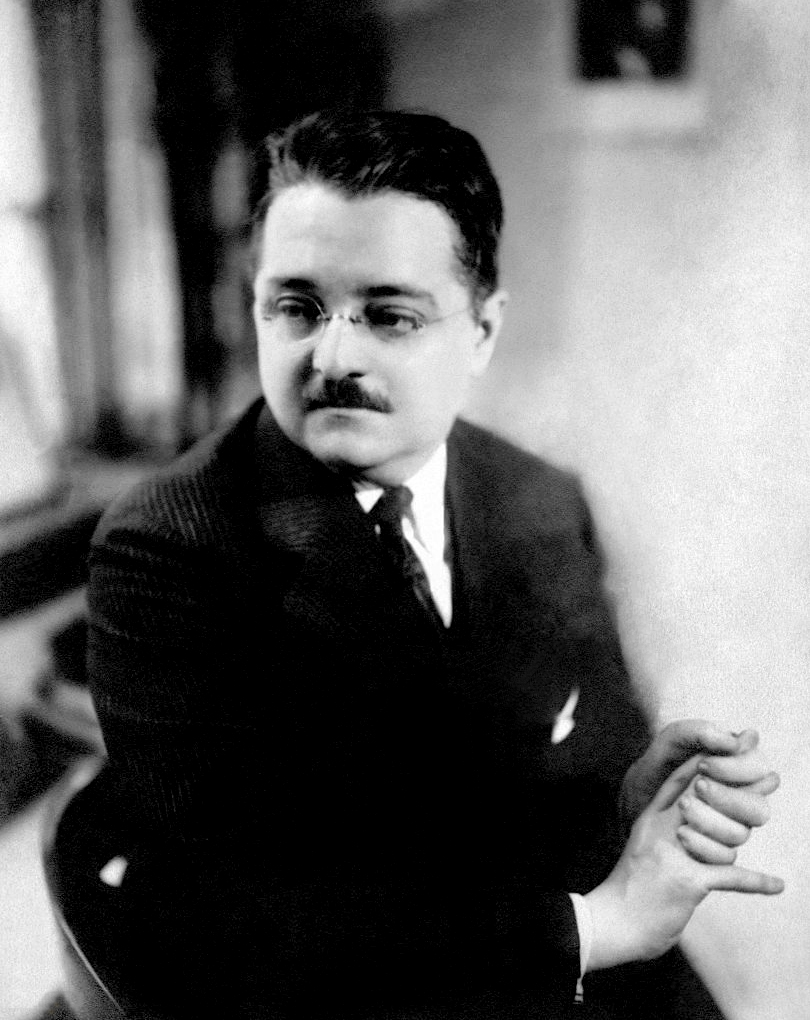
Alexander Woollcott in 1924

Alexander Humphreys Woollcott was the youngest of five children of Walter and Frances (Bucklin) Woollcott, born on January 19, 1887. The family lived in an 85-room house, a vast ramshackle building in Colts Neck Township, New Jersey known as "the North American Phalanx," which had once been a commune where many social experiments were carried out in the mid-19th century. When the Phalanx fell apart after a fire in 1854, it was taken over by and became the family seat of the Bucklin family, Woollcott's maternal grandparents.

In 1889, the itinerant and often absentee Walter Woollcott moved his family to Kansas City, Missouri. The Woollcotts lived in an upscale neighborhood where, at the age of four, Alexander portrayed the character of Puck from A Midsummer Night's Dream in a tableau vivant before an audience of more than 100 at the Woollcott home. The six years Woollcott lived in Kansas City were transformative, and set him on the literary and theatrical path that would guide the rest of his life. His second-grade teacher, Sophie Rosenberger, who would remain a lifelong friend, considered him precocious and set him on a reading program that began with Louisa May Alcott and progressed to Charles Dickens by the time he was 8 years old. It was also in Kansas City that he experienced his first theatrical performance, Sinbad the Sailor. He was accompanied by his neighbor, Kansas City Times columnist Roswell Field, brother of famed author Eugene Field. When young Aleck discovered that journalists could get free tickets to theatrical events he decided that he, too would become a newspaper man.

In 1895 Walter Woollcott lost the longest job he'd ever held, and sent his wife Frances and their children back to the Phalanx, where Alexander went to school and spent most of the remainder of his boyhood. He occasionally lodged in homes in Germantown, Philadelphia and attended the Germantown Combined Grammar School, and then Central High School in Philadelphia. He had very few friends during this period and did not enjoy this chapter of his life, with the exception of summers and any time that he could get back to the Phalanx.

With the help of a family friend, he made his way through college, graduating from Hamilton College, New York, in 1909. Despite a rather poor reputation (his nickname was "Putrid"), he founded a drama group, edited the student literary magazine, and was accepted by a fraternity (Theta Delta Chi).

== Writing career ==
Woollcott joined the staff of The New York Times as a cub reporter in 1909. In 1914, he was named drama critic and held the post until 1922, with a break for service during World War I. In April 1917, the day after war was declared, Woollcott volunteered as a private in the medical corps. Posted overseas, Woollcott was a sergeant when the intelligence section of the American Expeditionary Forces selected him and a half-dozen other newspaper men to create the Stars and Stripes, an official newspaper to bolster troop morale. As chief reporter for the Stars and Stripes, Woollcott was a member of the team that formed its editorial board. These included Harold Ross, founder of The New Yorker magazine; Cyrus Baldridge, multifaceted illustrator, author and writer; and the future columnist and radio personality, Franklin P. Adams. Going beyond simple propaganda, Woollcott and his colleagues reported the horrors of the Great War from the point of view of the common soldier. After the war he returned to The New York Times, then transferred to The New York Herald in 1922 and to The World in 1923. He remained there until 1928.

One of New York's most prolific drama critics, he was banned for a time from reviewing certain Broadway theater shows due to his florid and often vitriolic prose. He sued the Shubert theater organization for violation of the New York Civil Rights Act, but lost in the state's highest court in 1916 on the grounds that only discrimination on the basis of race, creed or color was unlawful. From 1929 to 1934, he wrote a column called "Shouts and Murmurs" for The New Yorker. His book, While Rome Burns, published by Grosset & Dunlap in 1934, was named twenty years later by critic Vincent Starrett as one of the 52 "Best Loved Books of the Twentieth Century". He was interested in crime writing, promoting the work of US and British mystery authors in his newspaper articles and on the radio as well as writing on true crime, and became involved in the case of Stanford University Press employee David Lamson, who was accused of murdering his wife (prosecutors eventually dropped the case).

Woollcott's 1924 review of the Marx Brothers' Broadway debut, I'll Say She Is, helped the group's career inflate from mere success to superstardom and started a lifelong friendship with Harpo Marx. Two of Harpo's adopted sons, Alexander Marx and William (Bill) Woollcott Marx, were named after Woollcott.

== Radio ==
Billed as The Early Bookworm, Woollcott was first heard on CBS Radio in October 1929, reviewing books in various timeslots until 1933. His CBS show The Town Crier, which began July 21, 1933, opened with the ringing of a bell and the cry, "Hear ye, hear ye!" followed by Woollcott's literary observations punctuated with acidic anecdotes. Sponsored by Cream of Wheat (1934–1935) and Grainger Tobacco (1937–1938), it continued until January 6, 1938. He had no reservations about using this forum to promote his own books, and the continual mentions of his book While Rome Burns (1934) probably helped make it a bestseller.

== Reputation ==
Woollcott was one of the most quoted men of his generation. Among Woollcott's classics is his description of the Los Angeles area as "Seven suburbs in search of a city"—a quip often attributed to his friend Dorothy Parker. Describing The New Yorker editor Harold Ross, he said: "He looks like a dishonest Abe Lincoln." He claimed the Brandy Alexander cocktail was named for him.

Woollcott was renowned for his savage tongue. He dismissed Oscar Levant, the notable wit and pianist, by observing, "There is absolutely nothing wrong with Oscar Levant that a miracle can't fix." He often greeted friends with "Hello, Repulsive." When a waiter asked him to repeat his order, he demanded "muffins filled with pus."

His judgments were frequently eccentric. Dorothy Parker once said: "I remember hearing Woollcott say reading Proust is like lying in someone else's dirty bath water. And then he'd go into ecstasy about something called Valiant Is the Word for Carrie, and I knew I had enough of the Round Table."

Wolcott Gibbs, who often edited Woollcott's work at The New Yorker, was quoted in James Thurber's The Years with Ross on Woollcott's writing:

"Shouts and Murmurs" was about the strangest copy I ever edited. You could take every other sentence out without changing the sense a particle. Whole department, in fact, often had no more substance than a "Talk [of the Town]" anecdote. I guess he was one of the most dreadful writers who ever existed.

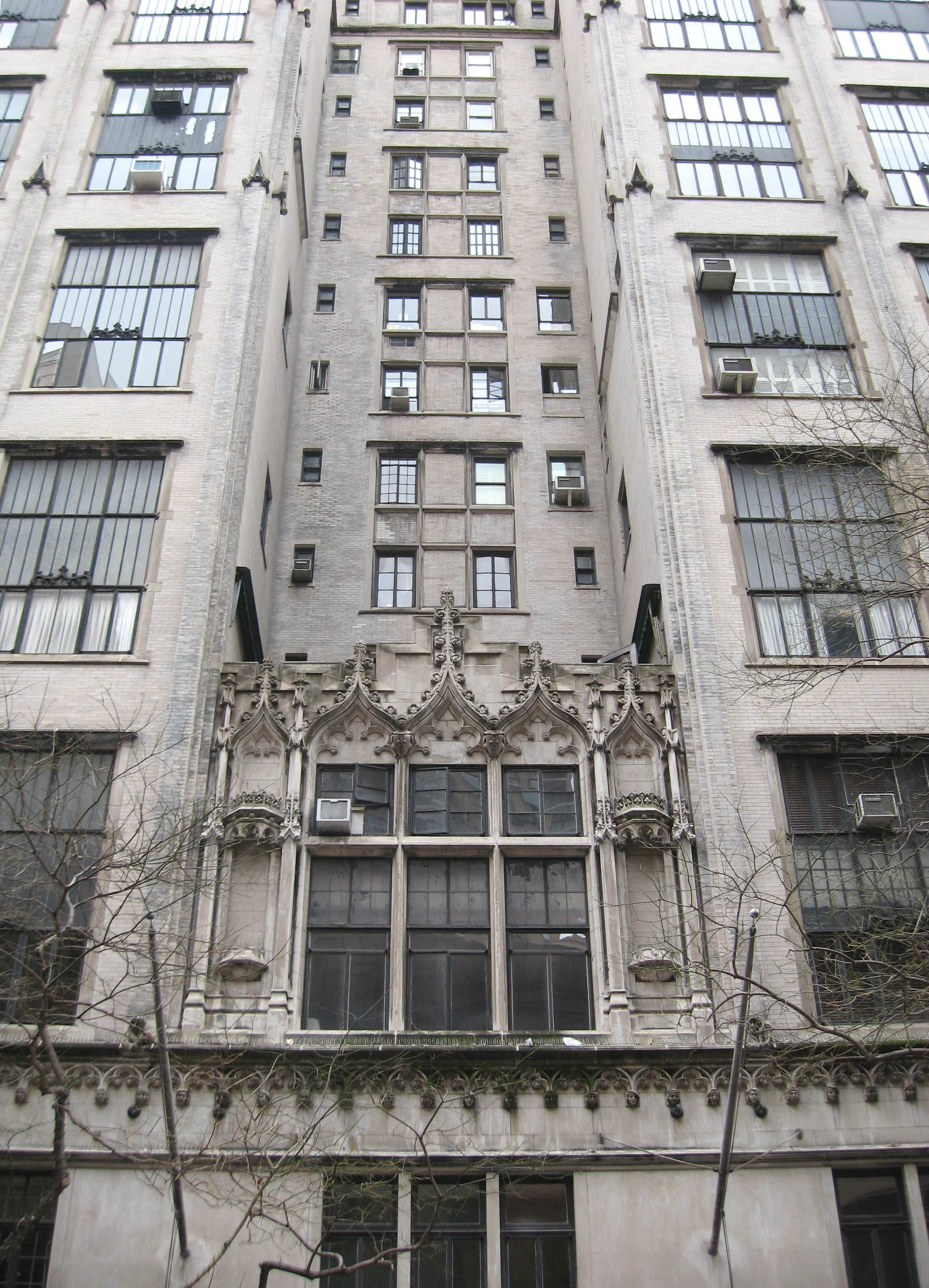
Hotel des Artistes

After being kicked out of the apartment he shared with The New Yorker founders Harold Ross and his wife Jane Grant, Woollcott moved first into the Hotel des Artistes on the Upper West Side of Manhattan, then to an apartment in The Campanile at the far end of East 52nd Street. The members of the Algonquin Round Table had a debate as to what to call his new home. Franklin P. Adams suggested that he name it after the faux Indian word Ocowoica, meaning "The-Little-Apartment-On-The-East-River-That-It-Is-Difficult-To-Find-A-Taxicab-Near". But Dorothy Parker came up with the definitive "Wit's End".

Woollcott yearned to be as creative as the people with whom he surrounded himself. Among many other endeavors, he tried his hand at acting and co-wrote two Broadway shows with playwright George S. Kaufman, while appearing in two others. He also starred as Sheridan Whiteside, for whom he was the inspiration, in the traveling production of The Man Who Came to Dinner in 1940. He also appeared in several cameos in films in the late 1930s and 1940s. He was caricatured twice in Warner Brothers cartoons in 1937: as "Owl Kott" in The Woods Are Full of Cuckoos, and as the town crier in Have You Got Any Castles?, playing almost identical roles in each.

Politically, Woollcott called for normalization of U.S.–Soviet relations. He was a friend of reporter Walter Duranty, even though he described him as a "man from Mars". As a friend of Soviet foreign minister Maxim Litvinov, he traveled to the USSR in the 1930s and sent his friend Harpo Marx to Moscow on a comedy tour in 1934. Yet he was attacked viciously in the left-wing press after his visit to the Soviet Union for his less than laudatory depiction of the "worker's paradise".

Towards the end of Woollcott's life he semi-retired to Neshobe Island in Lake Bomoseen in Vermont, which he had purchased. Shortly before he died, Woollcott claimed, "I never had anything to say."

Thurber in The Years With Ross also reports Woollcott describing himself as "the best writer in America", but with nothing in particular to say; Wolcott Gibbs made a similar criticism of him. Woollcott was primarily a storyteller, a retailer of anecdotes and superior gossip, as many of his personal letters reveal. His letters also reveal a warm and generous heart and a self-effacing manner distinct from his waspish public persona, and his many lasting and close friendships with the theatrical and literary elite of his day.

Woollcott was friends with actress Katharine Cornell, whom he lauded as the "First Lady of the Theatre". He often gave extremely favorable reviews both to her and the various productions of her husband, director Guthrie McClintic.

== Personal life ==
Reportedly, in his early twenties he contracted the mumps, which left him mostly, if not completely, impotent. He never married or had children, although he had some notable female friends, including Dorothy Parker and Neysa McMein, to whom he reportedly proposed the day after she had just wed her new husband, Jack Baragwanath. Woollcott once told McMein that "I'm thinking of writing the story of our life together. The title is already settled." McMein: "What is it?" Woollcott: "Under Separate Cover."

== Death and legacy ==
Woollcott appeared on his last radio broadcast on January 23, 1943, as a participant in a Writers' War Board panel discussion on the CBS Radio program The People's Platform marking the tenth anniversary of Adolf Hitler's rise to power, entitled "Is Germany Incurable?"

Other panelists included Hunter College president George Shuster, Brooklyn College president Harry Gideonse, and novelists Rex Stout and Marcia Davenport. The program's format began as a dinner party in the studio's private dining room, with the microphones in place. Table talk would lead into a live network radio broadcast, and each panelist would begin with a provocative response to the topic. "The German people are just as responsible for Hitler as the people of Chicago are for the Chicago Tribune", Woollcott stated emphatically.

In visible distress, Woollcott commented ten minutes into the broadcast that he was feeling ill, but continued his remarks. "It's a fallacy to think that Hitler was the cause of the world's present woes", he said. "Germany was the cause of Hitler." He said nothing further, but reportedly took a notepad and wrote the words, "I am sick." The radio audience remained unaware that Woollcott had suffered a heart attack and died at New York's Roosevelt Hospital, just four days after his 56th birthday, of a cerebral hemorrhage.

He was buried in Clinton, New York, at his alma mater, Hamilton College, but not without some confusion. By mistake, his ashes were sent to Colgate University in Hamilton, New York. When the error was corrected and the ashes were forwarded to Hamilton College, they arrived with 67¢ postage due.

== As You Were ==
At the time of his death, Woollcott had completed the editorial work on his last book, As You Were, an anthology of fiction, poetry and nonfiction for members of the armed forces. The idea of creating a much-needed "knapsack book" for service members reportedly came to Woollcott while he was staying at the White House in November 1942. An experienced anthologist, he drew on the knowledge of soldiers' reading preferences he gained while he was editor of Stars and Stripes during World War I, and also asked for nominations from friends including Stephen Vincent Benét, Carl Sandburg and Mark Van Doren.

Like his final radio broadcast, As You Were was a contribution to the war for which Woollcott waived all royalties and planned to donate profits to welfare organizations. The book was published by the Viking Press in March 1943.

== Broadway ==
- Wine of Choice (play, comedy) Starring: Alexander Woollcott as Binkie Niebuhr (February 21, 1938 – March 1938)
- The Dark Tower (play, melodrama) Written by Alexander Woollcott & George S. Kaufman (November 25, 1933 – January 1934)
- Brief Moment (play, comedy) Alexander Woollcott as Harold Sigrift (November 9, 1931 – February 1932)
- The Channel Road (play, comedy) Written by Alexander Woollcott & George S. Kaufman (October 17, 1929 – December 1929)

== Films ==
- Mr. W's Little Game (1934) Woollcott's only short subject, set in a nightclub. The peevish "Mr. W." grudgingly plays a word game with a blonde (Marion Martin, in her first film) and a waiter (Leo G. Carroll).
- Gift of Gab (1934) Alexander Woollcott appeared in a cameo in this Universal Pictures feature.
- The Scoundrel (1935) This Oscar-winning film was made by Woollcott's friends Ben Hecht and Charles MacArthur, and starred longtime Woollcott friend Noël Coward. Woollcott appeared in a supporting role.
- Babes on Broadway (1941) Woollcott has a cameo in this Mickey Rooney–Judy Garland musical.
- The Gold Rush (1942 re-release) In the opening credits can be found "Dedicated to Alexander Woollcott in appreciation of his praise of this picture."

== Film portrayals ==
- Woollcott was portrayed by actor Earl Montgomery in the 1962 film Act One
- Woollcott was portrayed by actor Jock Livingston in the 1968 musical film Star!
- Woollcott was portrayed by actor Tom Clancy in the 1979 NBC TV miniseries Backstairs at the White House
- Woollcott was portrayed by actor Tom McGowan in the 1994 film Mrs. Parker and the Vicious Circle

== Books ==
- Mrs Fiske: Her views on Actors, Acting and the Problems of Production (1917) – Minnie Maddern Fiske (1865–1932) was one of the foremost actresses of her day. Woollcott's first book is a study of her thoughts on the acting profession.
- The Command is Forward (1919) – A collection of his reportage and essays from Stars and Stripes.
- Shouts and Murmurs (1922) – Theatre articles. His column in The New Yorker was named after this book. The New Yorker revived the title as a catch-all for humorous pieces in the 1990s.
- Mr. Dickens Goes to the Play (1922) – A few chapters by Woollcott on Charles Dickens's love of the theatre and a great many reprinted selections from Dickens's writings.
- Enchanted Aisles (1924) – More theatre articles.
- The Story of Irving Berlin (1925) – The rags-to-riches story of the composer.
- Going to Pieces (1928) – More stories of Woollcott's friends in and out of the theatre.
- Two Gentlemen and a Lady (1928) – A short book about dogs.
- While Rome Burns (1934) – Assorted pieces reprinted in book form.
- The Woollcott Reader (1935) – An anthology of works by other writers that Woollcott felt deserved the public's attention.
- Woollcott's Second Reader (1937) – More of the same.
- Long, Long Ago (1943) – Issued just after his death.
- As You Were (1943) – An anthology of other people's works, compiled by Woollcott for issue to servicemen in the Second World War.
- The Letters of Alexander Woollcott (1944) – A collection of his voluminous correspondence compiled by Beatrice Kaufman and Joseph Hennessey.
- The Portable Woollcott (1946) – An anthology.

== See also ==
- Have You Got Any Castles? – 1938 Warner Bros. Merrie Melodies cartoon featuring a caricature of Woollcott as "The Town Crier". Woollcott requested that the scenes featuring his caricature be cut for re-distribution after his death, but they were later restored to the film and the complete short is available on DVD.
- The Woods Are Full of Cuckoos – 1937 Warner Bros. Merrie Melodies cartoon features an owl caricature of Woollcott (appropriately named "Owlcott") opening and closing the "Woodland Community Swing".
