= The Lifted Veil =

The Lifted Veil may refer to:

- "The Lifted Veil" (novella), an 1859 novella by George Eliot
- The Lifted Veil (film), a 1917 American silent film directed by George D. Baker
