= Frank Gillmore =

American actor

- Frank Gillmore in 1908
- Born: May 14, 1867; New York City, U.S.
- Died: March 29, 1943 (aged 75); New York City, U.S.
- Occupation: Actor
- Years active: 1879–1943
- Spouse: Laura Margaret MacGillivray
- Children: Ruth Gillmore; Margalo Gillmore

3rd President of the Actors' Equity Association
- In office 1928–1937
- Preceded by: John Emerson
- Succeeded by: Burgess Meredith (acting president)

Frank Parker Gillmore (May 14, 1867 – March 29, 1943) was an American playwright and a stage and early film actor. He was a founder and former President of Actor's Equity.

He was born in New York City to John Parker Gillmore and his actress wife, Emily (née Thorne: died March 5, 1907), sister of the actress Sarah Thorne and actors Thomas and George Thorne. At the time of his birth his parents were touring the United States, returning to Great Britain three weeks after their son's birth. Frank Gillmore was educated at the Chiswick Collegiate School in London and made his stage debut in London in 1879, then toured the British provinces for three years before returning to the London stage where he remained for a further five years. During this period he shared lodgings with George Arliss. Gillmore then alternated between appearances in Britain and America for a further five years. Aged 17 he appeared with Lillie Langtry.

He married the American actress Laura Margaret MacGillivray whom he met when they both appeared in an American tour of Lady Windermere's Fan. With her he had two daughters, the actors Ruth Gillmore and Margalo Gillmore. Frank Gillmore appeared as a leading man with the companies of Minnie Fiske, Henrietta Crosman, Mary Mannering, Bertha Kalich and George Fawcett, among others.

Gillmore's stage appearances included a single matinee performance of The Merchant of Venice on October 17, 1895 at the Gaiety Theatre in London, when he played Bassanio, The Ghost of Jerry Bundler at the Haymarket Theatre in London in September 1902, and A Japanese Nightingale which opened at Daly's Theater in New York in November 1903.

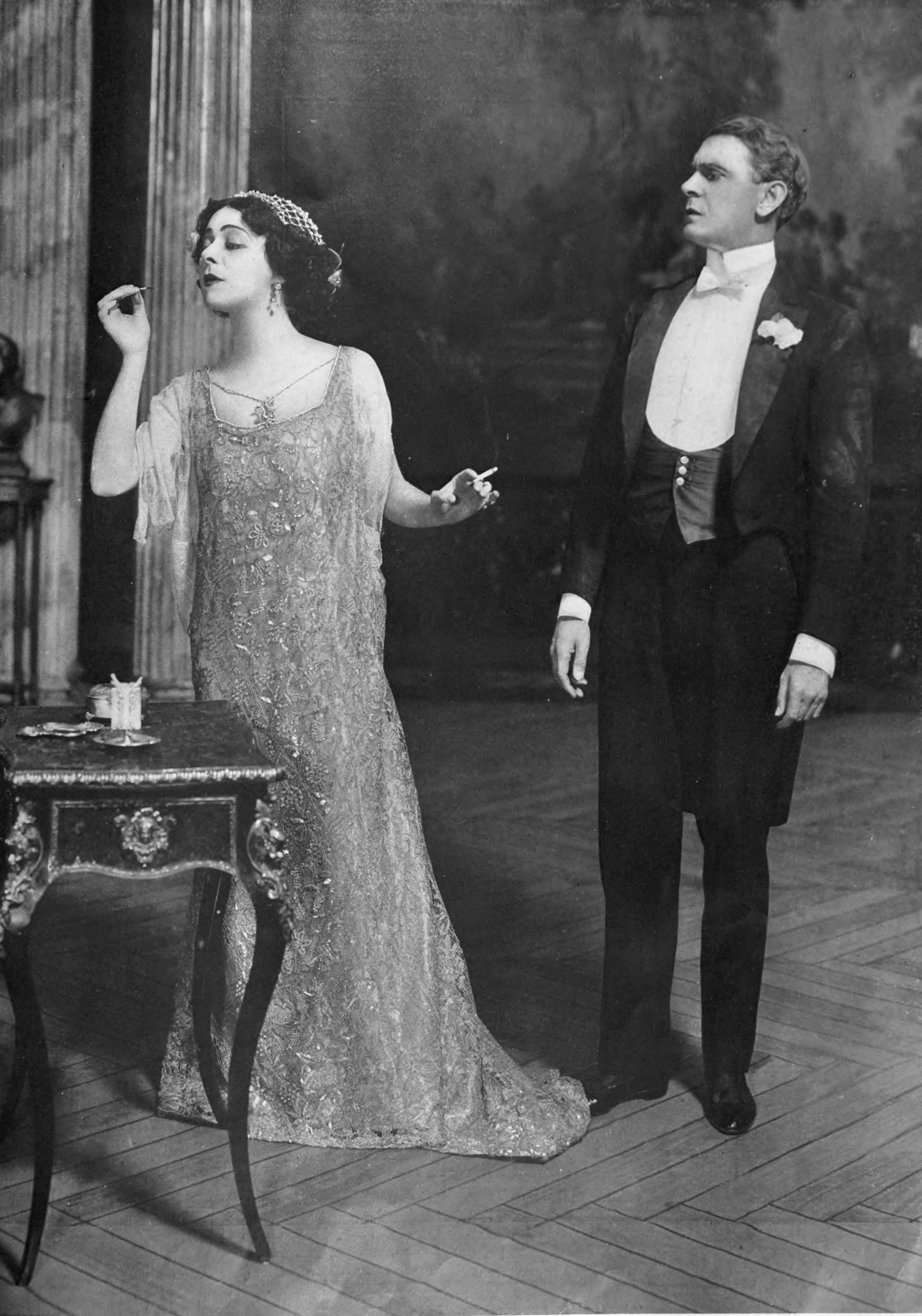
Mme Nazimova and Frank Gillmore in Pierre Wolff’s Comedy “The Marionettes” at the Lyceum Theatre, 1912

Gillmore returned to America semi-permanently sometime in the late 1890s, and took his family with him. He and his family were long time summer residents of the Actor's Colony at Siasconset, and he was a former president of the Siasconset Casino. Gillmore became a founder of the Actors' Equity Association in 1913 after the Actors Society of America disbanded in 1912. He made two silent films, The Fairy and the Waif (1915) and The Lifted Veil (1917).

From 1918 to 1929 he was the union's Executive Secretary and eventual President, a position he held from 1929 to 1937. He was also the international President of the Associated Actors and Artistes of America from 1938 to 1943 and a Freemason.

As President of Actor's Equity Gillmore received The American Arbitration Association's annual gold Commercial Peace Medal in May 1931 "for distinguished service in the establishment of commercial peace through arbitration"

Frank Gillmore died of cancer in New York City on March 29, 1943, aged 75.
