= Sarah Thorne =

English actress and manager (1836–1899)

Sarah Wendy Thorne

Sarah Thorne (10 May 1836 – 27 February 1899) was a British actress and actress-manager of the 19th century who managed the Theatre Royal at Margate for many years. She ran a school for acting there which is widely regarded as Britain's first formal drama school. The Sarah Thorne Theatre Club in Broadstairs is named in her memory.

== Early life ==
Sarah Thorne was born in London in 1836, the eldest of ten children born to Richard Samuel Thorne (1813–1875), an actor and theatre manager who managed the Surrey Theatre, and his wife, Sarah née Rogers (1812–1896). Two of her younger brothers were Thomas Thorne, one of the founding managers of London's Vaudeville Theatre, and George Thorne, the singer and actor, best known for his performances in the comic baritone roles of the Savoy Operas with the D'Oyly Carte Opera Company. Sarah Thorne made her stage debut aged 12 on 26 December 1848 in a pantomime produced by her father at the Pavilion Theatre, Whitechapel. Over the next few years she went on to appear in stock companies all over Great Britain. On 6 August 1855 she joined her father's company for the summer season at Margate.

Thorne then moved to Ireland where she stayed for three seasons, appearing as the leading lady at the Theatre Royal, Dublin as Desdemona in Othello opposite Charles Kean, and playing Lady Macbeth to Gustavus Vaughan Brooke's Macbeth. Thorne then toured Ireland and Scotland. She married the Irish political author and biographer Thomas Macknight. They had two children during their three years together, Edmund (born 1860) and Elizabeth (born 1862), but due to incompatibility the couple separated soon after the birth of their daughter.

== Actress-manager ==
Sarah Thorne

Returning to the United Kingdom, from August 1863 to 1865 she appeared in leading roles in Paisley and Edinburgh. She also appeared in Jersey. From October 1865 to March 1866 she played the leading female roles in the plays of Shakespeare at the National Standard Theatre in Shoreditch High Street.

She became an actress-manager in 1867 when she took over the lease of the Theatre Royal, Margate from her father, Richard Samuel Thorne. Sarah Thorne declared that, under her management, she intended to offer the "newest pieces approved in the metropolis as occasion permits" but also would not forget to produce "old and legitimate productions". When the theatre's lease was sold at auction in August 1873 she was forced to hold a less responsible managerial role during 1874. Christmas 1874 saw her return to Margate during the tour of her annual pantomime.

In March 1876 Thorne took over the Theatre Royal at Worcester as actress-manager. Here she booked touring companies as well as having her own company of actors producing both classical and new drama. When the Theatre Royal burnt down in November 1877 Thorne founded a touring company which included the veteran actor Charles James Mathews.

The lease of the Theatre Royal in Margate becoming once again available, in January 1879 Thorne returned to that venue, booking touring companies which included that of her brother Thomas Thorne, one of the founding managers of London's Vaudeville Theatre.

In late 1879 she leased Astley's Amphitheatre in London for a short period. Here she appeared with another brother, George Thorne, who had trained under her as an actor. It is claimed that Thorne had a "somewhat imperious manner"

== School of acting ==
Thorne opened her 'School of Acting' in 1885, based at the Theatre Royal in Margate. Open to both men and women, her apprentices included Harley Granville-Barker, Louis Calvert, Gertrude Kingston, Julia Stewart, Evelyn Millard, Janet Achurch, Adelaide Neilson, her brother George Thorne and Irene and Violet Vanbrugh. Thorne's 'School of Acting' is widely regarded as being Britain's first formal drama school.

== Later years ==
In 1894 Thorne leased the Chatham Lecture Hall, renaming it the Opera House; it became an alternative venue for her theatrical company. Her last theatrical appearance was in Margate during her benefit in September 1898.

Sarah Thorne died at 3 New Road Avenue, Chatham, Kent on 27 February 1899. She was buried at Brompton Cemetery, West Brompton, London on 3 March 1899.

After her death her son and business manager, Edmund Macknight, took over the leases of the Opera House at Chatham and the Theatre Royal in Margate. Her daughter Elizabeth married the actor-manager Henry Dundas in 1883.

Thorne's nephew, the son of her sister Emily (died 5 March 1907) and her husband, actor Frank Parker Gillmore, was the actor and playwright Frank Gillmore. His daughters were the actresses Ruth Gillmore and Margalo Gillmore.

== Legacy ==
The Sarah Thorne Theatre, a small-scale performing arts centre sited in a Kent County Council owned building in Broadstairs, Kent, presents plays, concerts, panto and opera. Its patrons have included Judi Dench, David Suchet, Julian Fellowes and Gyles Brandreth.
