= Cause for Alarm! (film) =

1951 film by Tay Garnett

- Theatrical release poster
- Directed by: Tay Garnett
- Screenplay by: Mel Dinelli; Tom Lewis
- Based on: Cause for Alarm radio play by Larry Marcus
- Produced by: Tom Lewis
- Starring: Loretta Young; Barry Sullivan; Bruce Cowling; Margalo Gillmore
- Cinematography: Joseph Ruttenberg
- Edited by: James E. Newcom
- Music by: André Previn
- Distributed by: Metro-Goldwyn-Mayer
- Release date: March 29, 1951 (New York)
- Running time: 74 minutes
- Country: United States
- Language: English
- Budget: $635,000
- Box office: $768,000

Cause for Alarm! is a 1951 melodrama suspense film directed by Tay Garnett, starring Loretta Young and Barry Sullivan and written by Mel Dinelli and Tom Lewis based on a story by Larry Marcus. The film is in the public domain.

== Plot ==
During World War II, Ellen works as a nurse in a naval hospital. While dating military doctor Ranney Grahame, Ellen meets Ranney's pilot friend George Jones and they fall in love and marry.

Years later in their suburban house, George is gravely ill with a heart condition and confined to his bed. With the help of Ranney, now George's personal physician, she tends to George's needs despite his increasing hostility. During a heat wave, George becomes delusional and Ranney concludes that George needs psychological help.

In his delusional state, George wrongly suspects that Ellen and Ranney are having an affair and that they are conspiring to kill him with overdoses of his heart medication. He writes a letter to the district attorney accusing Ellen and Ranney of conspiring to murder him and then gives the letter to Ellen to send in the mail. Ellen hands the letter to the postman, thinking that it is correspondence with their insurance company. When Ellen returns to George's room, she finds him out of bed and manic. He informs her of the letter's contents and points a gun at her, declaring that he has arranged the situation so that he can shoot her and justify it as self-defense. Before George can pull the trigger, he collapses on the bed and dies.

Realizing that George's letter could frame her as his murderer, Ellen rushes to retrieve it but faces numerous obstacles. She finds the postman, who will only return the letter if George requests it himself. He suggests that she appeal to the supervisor of the post office before the letter is processed for delivery.

George's overbearing aunt Clara arrives at the house to visit George and enters using a hidden key. Ellen returns home in time to prevent Clara from entering George's bedroom and finding his body, and after some desperate hysterics, persuades her to leave. While preparing to visit the post office, Ellen notices the gun still in George's hand and tries to remove it, but she inadvertently causes it to fire a bullet into the floor while the room's window is open. Neighbor boy Billy hears, and Ellen fears that others may have heard the shot. A notary arrives for an appointment with George, but Ellen denies him entry by insisting that George is too ill to see visitors. As Ellen hastily reverses her car in the driveway, she narrowly avoids colliding with Billy. Her nosy neighbor witnesses the incident and becomes another possible witness.

As Ellen speeds toward the post office, she becomes increasingly desperate as she considers the possible witnesses who could testify against her: the postman, Aunt Clara, Billy, the neighbor, the notary and the druggist. At the post office, the supervisor tries to help Ellen but gives her a form to be signed by George before she can take the letter. She persuades the supervisor to overlook the regulation, but he instead asks to read the letter, and Ellen frantically refuses. The supervisor is annoyed and refuses to help her further, stating that the letter will proceed to its destination.

Ellen returns home, defeated. When Ranney arrives to check on George's condition, she admits that George is dead and tells Ranney about the letter. The doorbell rings and Ellen despairs, expecting that the police have arrived to arrest her. However, the man at the door is the postman, who has come to return George's letter because it bears insufficient postage. Ellen is overcome with relief and Ranney tears the letter and burns the pieces.

== Cast ==
- Loretta Young as Ellen Jones
- Barry Sullivan as George Z. Jones
- Bruce Cowling as Dr. Ranney Grahame
- Margalo Gillmore as Aunt Clara Edwards
- Bradley Mora as Hoppy (Billy)
- Irving Bacon as Joe Carston, the postman
- Georgia Backus as Mrs. Warren, the neighbor
- Don Haggerty as Mr. Russell, the notary
- Art Baker as post-office superintendent
- Richard Anderson as wounded sailor at a naval hospital

== Production ==
The film's producer Tom Lewis considered Judy Garland for the lead role before awarding it to his wife Loretta Young. Veteran character actor Irving Bacon, who plays the postman, was already widely known as the weary postman in the popular Blondie series of 28 films a decade earlier. Former child star Carl "Alfalfa" Switzer (of the Our Gang comedy shorts) has a cameo appearance as a man repairing a hot-rod car.

Director Tay Garnett thoroughly prepared the cast and crew, and the film was shot in 14 days, a tight schedule for the era. Loretta Young used the same preproduction technique for her television series several years later. André Previn wrote the film's score.

Location shooting occurred on residential side streets near Melrose Avenue in Hollywood.

== Reception ==
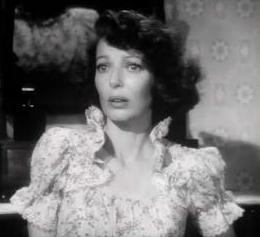
Young's performance in the film was praised by Time magazine and The New York Times when Cause for Alarm! was released in 1951.

In a contemporary review for The New York Times, critic Bosley Crowther wrote: "Here a simple situation is turned into a thoroughly chilling business by highlighting the most humdrum staples of the everyday American scene ... 'Cause for Alarm!' proves more than anything else that superior writing, directing and acting—and some imagination—can make a little go a long way ... The suspense, under Director Tay Garnett, mounts steadily, almost unbearably, until a final plot twist so original that it's almost a swindle."

Time magazine characterized the film "as the year's first thriller with an honest quota of thrills. It pulls off the old Hitchcock trick of giving commonplace people, events and settings a sinister meaning, and it develops its simple, one-track idea with frightening logic." Time's review also noted the strong supporting performances of Margalo Gillmore and Irving Bacon along with the film's "quiet, sunny atmosphere of a pleasant residential street" in Los Angeles.

According to MGM records, the film earned $518,000 in the U.S. and Canada and $250,000 elsewhere, resulting in a loss of $174,000.

== Legacy ==
Cause for Alarm! is one of several 1950s-era MGM films that fell into the public domain after their copyrights were not renewed in the 1970s. The original film elements are now owned by Turner Entertainment, with distribution rights handled by Warner Bros. (which spoofed the title in the 1954 cartoon Claws for Alarm).

== See also ==
- List of films in the public domain in the United States
