= Algonquin Round Table =

Group of actors, critics, wits, and writers

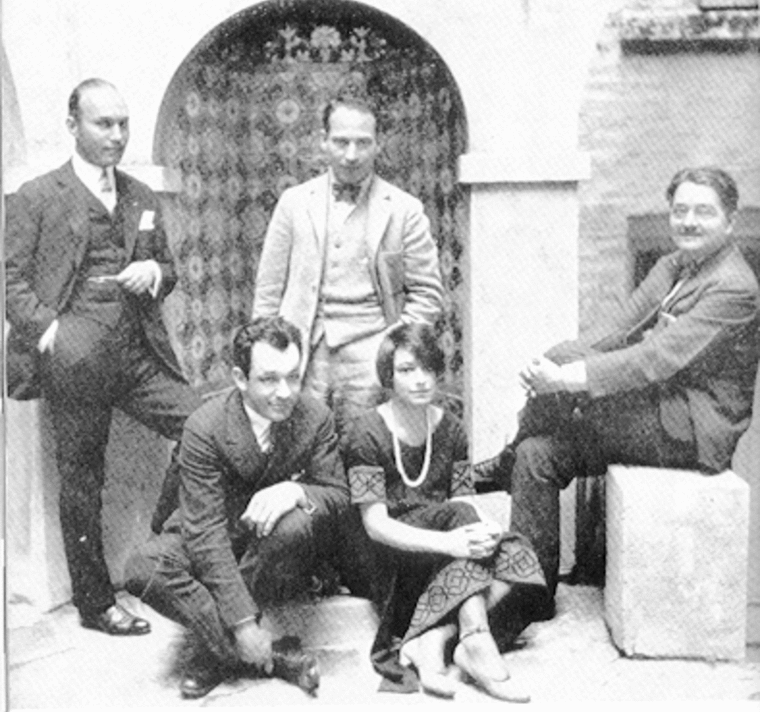
Members and associates of the Algonquin Round Table (standing, left to right): Art Samuels and Harpo Marx; (sitting) Charles MacArthur, Dorothy Parker, and Alexander Woollcott

The Algonquin Round Table was a group of New York City writers, critics, actors, and wits. Gathering initially as part of a practical joke, members of "The Vicious Circle", as they dubbed themselves, met for lunch each day at the Algonquin Hotel from 1919 until roughly 1929. At these luncheons they engaged in wisecracks, wordplay, and witticisms that through the newspaper columns of Round Table members, were disseminated across the country.

Daily association with each other, both at the luncheons and outside of them, inspired members of the Circle to collaborate creatively. The entire group worked together successfully only once, however, to create a revue called No Sirree! which helped launch a Hollywood career for Round Tabler Robert Benchley.

In its ten years of association, the Round Table and a number of its members acquired national reputations, both for their contributions to literature and for their sparkling wit. Although some of their contemporaries, and later in life even some of its members, disparaged the group, its reputation has endured long after its dissolution.

== Origin ==
The group that would become the Round Table began meeting in June 1919 as the result of a practical joke carried out by theatrical press agent John Peter Toohey. Toohey, annoyed at The New York Times drama critic Alexander Woollcott for refusing to plug one of Toohey's clients (Eugene O'Neill) in his column, organized a luncheon supposedly to welcome Woollcott back from World War I, where he had been a correspondent for Stars and Stripes. Instead, Toohey used the occasion to poke fun at Woollcott on a number of fronts. Woollcott's enjoyment of the joke and the success of the event prompted Toohey to suggest that the group in attendance meet at the Algonquin each day for lunch.

The group first gathered in the Algonquin's Pergola Room (later called the Oak Room) at a long rectangular table. As they increased in number, Algonquin manager Frank Case moved them to the Rose Room and a round table. Initially the group called itself "The Board" and the luncheons "Board meetings". After being assigned a waiter named Luigi, the group re-christened itself "Luigi Board". Finally, they became "The Vicious Circle" although "The Round Table" gained wide currency after a caricature by cartoonist Edmund Duffy of the Brooklyn Eagle portrayed the group sitting at a round table and wearing armor.

== Membership ==
A 1923 group caricature of the Round Table by Bill Breck

Charter members of the Round Table included:

- Franklin Pierce Adams, columnist
- Robert Benchley, humorist and actor
- Heywood Broun, columnist and sportswriter (married to Ruth Hale)
- Marc Connelly, playwright
- Ruth Hale, freelance writer who worked for women's rights
- George S. Kaufman, playwright and director
- Dorothy Parker, critic, poet, short-story writer, and screenwriter
- Brock Pemberton, Broadway producer
- Murdock Pemberton, Broadway publicist, writer
- Harold Ross, The New Yorker editor
- Robert E. Sherwood, author and playwright
- John Peter Toohey, Broadway publicist
- Alexander Woollcott, critic and journalist

Membership was not official or fixed. Many others moved in and out of the Circle. Some of these included:

- Tallulah Bankhead, actress
- Norman Bel Geddes, stage and industrial designer
- Noël Coward, playwright
- Blyth Daly, actress
- Edna Ferber, author and playwright
- Eva Le Gallienne, actress
- Stephen Courtleigh Broadway, radio and film actor
- Margalo Gillmore, actress
- Jane Grant, journalist and feminist (married to Harold Ross)
- Beatrice Kaufman, editor and playwright (married to George S. Kaufman)
- Margaret Leech, writer and historian
- Herman J. Mankiewicz, screenwriter
- Harpo Marx, comedian and film star
- Neysa McMein, magazine illustrator
- Alice Duer Miller, writer
- Katherine Sproehnle, writer
- Laurence Stallings, writer
- Donald Ogden Stewart, playwright and screenwriter
- Frank Sullivan, journalist and humorist
- Deems Taylor, composer
- Estelle Winwood, actress and comedian
- Peggy Wood, actress

== Activities ==
In addition to the daily luncheons, members of the Round Table worked and associated with each other almost constantly. The group was devoted to games, including cribbage and poker, it also had its own poker club, the Thanatopsis Literary and Inside Straight Club, which met at the hotel on Saturday nights. Regulars at the game included Kaufman, Adams, Broun, Ross and Woollcott, with non-Round Tablers Herbert Bayard Swope, silk merchant Paul Hyde Bonner, baking heir Raoul Fleischmann, actor Harpo Marx, and writer Ring Lardner sometimes sitting in. The group also played charades (which they called simply "The Game") and the "I can give you a sentence" game, which spawned Dorothy Parker's memorable sentence using the word horticulture: "You can lead a horticulture but you can't make her think."

Members often visited Neshobe Island, a private island co-owned by several "Algonks"—but governed by Woollcott as a "benevolent tyrant", as his biographer Samuel Hopkins Adams charitably put it—located on several acres in the middle of Lake Bomoseen in Vermont. There they would engage in their usual array of games including wink murder, which they called simply "Murder", plus croquet.

A number of Round Tablers were inveterate practical jokers, pulling pranks on one another. As time went on, the jokes became more elaborate. Harold Ross and Jane Grant once spent weeks playing a particularly memorable joke on Woollcott involving a prized portrait of himself. They had several copies made, each slightly more askew than the last, and would periodically secretly swap them out and then later comment to Woollcott "What on earth is wrong with your portrait?" until Woollcott was beside himself. Eventually they returned the original portrait.

== No Sirree! ==
Given the literary and theatrical activities of the Round Table members, it was perhaps inevitable that they would write and stage their own revue. No Sirree!, staged for one night only on April 30, 1922, was a take-off of a then-popular European touring revue called La Chauve-Souris, directed by Nikita Balieff.

No Sirree! had its genesis at the studio of Neysa McMein, which served as something of a salon for Round Tablers away from the Algonquin. Acts included: "Opening Chorus" featuring Woollcott, Toohey, Kaufman, Connelly, Adams and Benchley with violinist Jascha Heifetz providing offstage, off-key accompaniment; "He Who Gets Flapped", a musical number featuring the song "The Everlastin' Ingenue Blues" written by Dorothy Parker and performed by Robert Sherwood accompanied by "chorus girls" including Tallulah Bankhead, Helen Hayes, Ruth Gillmore, Lenore Ulric and Mary Brandon; "Zowie, or the Curse of an Akins Heart"; "The Greasy Hag, an O'Neill Play in One Act" with Kaufman, Connelly and Woollcott; and "Mr. Whim Passes By—An A. A. Milne Play."

The only item of note to emerge from No Sirree! was Robert Benchley's contribution, The Treasurer's Report. Benchley's disjointed parody so delighted those in attendance that Irving Berlin hired Benchley in 1923 to deliver the Report as part of Berlin's Music Box Revue for $500 a week. In 1928, Report was later made into a short sound film in the Fox Movietone sound-on-film system by Fox Film Corporation. The film marked the beginning of a second career for Benchley in Hollywood.

With the success of No Sirree! the Round Tablers hoped to duplicate it with an "official" Vicious Circle production open to the public with material performed by professional actors. Kaufman and Connelly funded the revue, named The Forty-niners. The revue opened in November 1922 and was a failure, running for just 15 performances.

== Decline ==
As members of the Round Table moved into ventures outside New York City, inevitably the group drifted apart. By the early 1930s the Vicious Circle was broken. Edna Ferber said she realized it when she arrived at the Rose Room for lunch one day in 1932 and found the group's table occupied by a family from Kansas. Frank Case was asked what happened to the group, he shrugged and replied, "What became of the reservoir at Fifth Avenue and Forty-Second Street? These things do not last forever." Some members of the group remained friends after its dissolution. Parker and Benchley in particular remained close up until his death in 1945, although her political leanings did strain their relationship. Others, as the group itself would come to understand when it gathered following Woollcott's death in 1943, simply realized that they had nothing to say to one another.

== Public response and legacy ==
Because a number of the members of the Round Table had regular newspaper columns, the activities and quips of various Round Table members were reported in the national press. This brought Round Tablers widely into the public consciousness as renowned wits.

Not all of their contemporaries were fans of the group. Their critics accused them of logrolling, or exchanging favorable plugs of one another's works, and of rehearsing their witticisms in advance. James Thurber (who lived in the hotel) was a detractor of the group, accusing them of being too consumed by their elaborate practical jokes. H. L. Mencken, who was much admired by many in the Circle, was also a critic, commenting to fellow writer Anita Loos that "their ideals were those of a vaudeville actor, one who is extremely 'in the know' and inordinately trashy".

The group showed up in the 1923 best-seller Black Oxen by Gertrude Atherton. She sarcastically described a group she called "the Sophisticates":

They met at the sign of the Indian Chief where the cleverest of them—and those who were so excitedly sure of their cleverness that for the moment they convinced others as well as themselves—foregathered daily. There was a great deal of scintillating talk in this group of the significant books and tendencies of the day....They appraised, debated, rejected, finally placed the seal of their august approval upon a favored few.

Groucho Marx, brother of Round Table associate Harpo, was never comfortable amidst the viciousness of the Vicious Circle. Therein he remarked "The price of admission is a serpent's tongue and a half-concealed stiletto." Even some members of the Round Table disparaged it later in life. Dorothy Parker in particular criticized the group.

These were no giants. Think who was writing in those days—Lardner, Fitzgerald, Faulkner and Hemingway. Those were the real giants. The Round Table was just a lot of people telling jokes and telling each other how good they were. Just a bunch of loudmouths showing off, saving their gags for days, waiting for a chance to spring them....There was no truth in anything they said. It was the terrible day of the wisecrack, so there didn't have to be any truth...

While it is true that some members of the Round Table are perhaps now "famous for being famous" instead of for their literary output, Round Table members and associates contributed to the literary landscape, including Pulitzer Prize-winning work by Circle members Kaufman, Connelly, Sherwood (who won four), and by associate Ferber, as well as the legacy of Ross's New Yorker. Others made contributions to the realms of stage and screen – Tallulah Bankhead and Eva Le Gallienne became Broadway greats, the films of Harpo and Benchley remain popular, and Parker is renowned for her short stories and literary reviews.

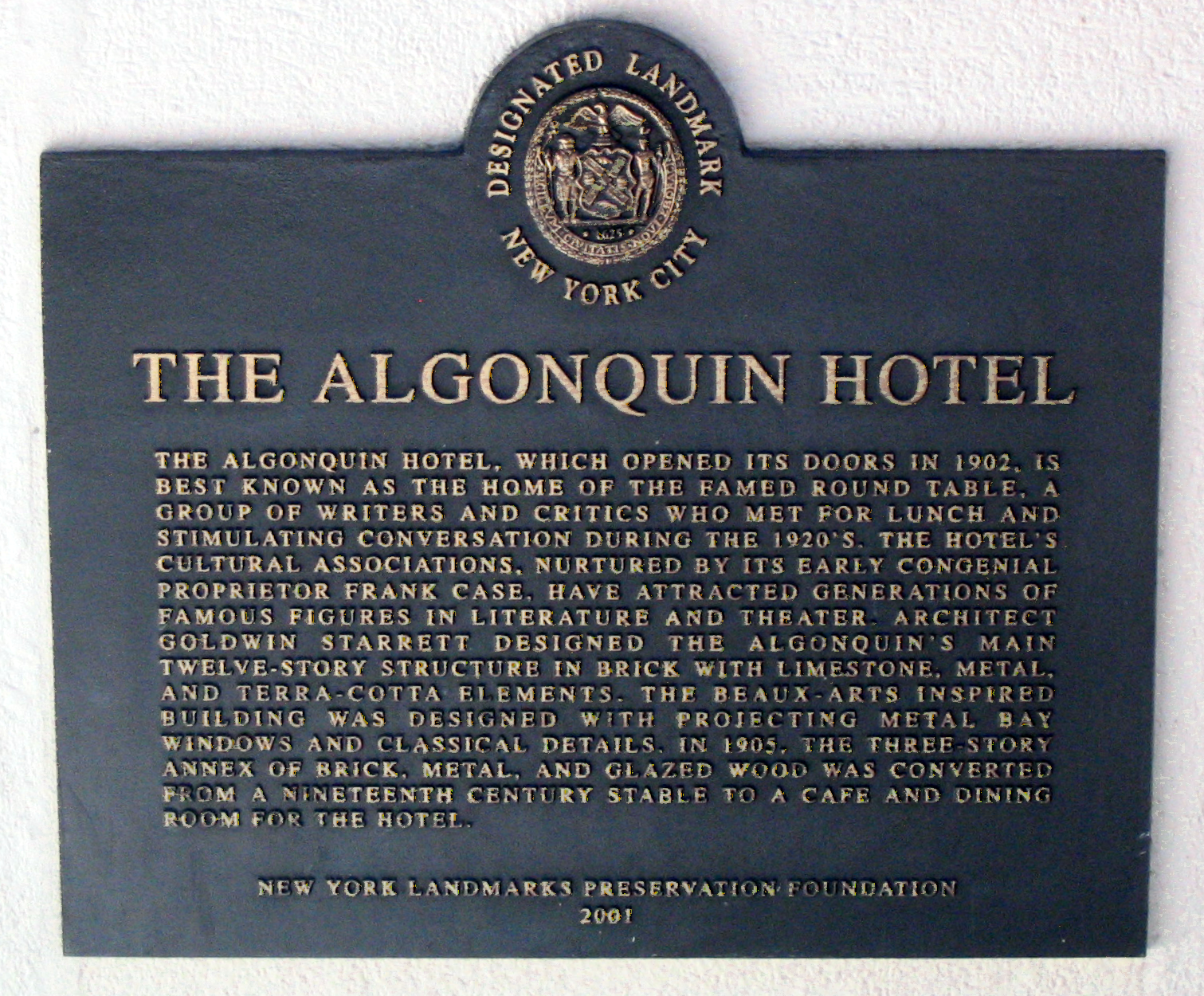
Algonquin Hotel Landmark Sign

The Algonquin Round Table, as well as the number of other literary and theatrical greats who lodged there, helped earn the Algonquin Hotel its status as a New York City Historic Landmark. The hotel was so designated in 1987. In 1996 the hotel was designated a national literary landmark by the Friends of Libraries USA based on the contributions of "The Round Table Wits". The organization's bronze plaque is attached to the front of the hotel. Although the Rose Room was removed from the Algonquin in a 1998 remodel, the hotel paid tribute to the group by commissioning and hanging the painting A Vicious Circle by Natalie Ascencios, depicting the Round Table and also created a replica of the original table. The hotel occasionally stages an original musical production, The Talk of the Town, in the Oak Room. Its latest production started September 11, 2007 and ran through the end of the year.

A film about the members, The Ten-Year Lunch (1987), won the Academy Award for Best Documentary Feature. The dramatic film Mrs. Parker and the Vicious Circle (1994) recounts the Round Table from the perspective of Dorothy Parker.
