= Mrs. Parker and the Vicious Circle =

- Theatrical release poster
- Directed by: Alan Rudolph
- Written by: Alan Rudolph; Randy Sue Coburn
- Produced by: Robert Altman
- Starring: Jennifer Jason Leigh; Campbell Scott; Matthew Broderick; Peter Gallagher; Jennifer Beals; Andrew McCarthy; Wallace Shawn; Martha Plimpton; Sam Robards; Lili Taylor; James LeGros; Gwyneth Paltrow; Heather Graham; Stephen Baldwin; Tom McGowan; Rebecca Miller
- Cinematography: Jan Kiesser
- Edited by: Suzy Elmiger
- Music by: Mark Isham
- Distributed by: Fine Line Features (United States and Canada); Miramax Films (International)
- Release date: September 7, 1994
- Running time: 126 minutes
- Country: United States
- Language: English
- Budget: $7 million
- Box office: $2,144,667

Mrs. Parker and the Vicious Circle is a 1994 American biographical drama film directed by Alan Rudolph from a screenplay written by Rudolph and Randy Sue Coburn. The film stars Jennifer Jason Leigh as writer Dorothy Parker and depicts the members of the Algonquin Round Table, a group of writers, actors and critics who met almost every weekday from 1919 to 1929 at Manhattan's Algonquin Hotel.

The film was an Official Selection at the 1994 Cannes Film Festival and was nominated for the Palme d'Or. The film was a critical hit but not a commercial success. Leigh won the National Society of Film Critics Award for Best Actress.

Peter Benchley, who plays editor Frank Crowninshield, was the grandson of humorist Robert Benchley, who once worked underneath Crowninshield. Actor Wallace Shawn is the son of William Shawn, the longtime editor of The New Yorker.

== Plot ==
During the Prohibition era in the United States, the Algonquin Hotel is a hub for the "Vicious Circle," a group of intellectuals. Among them is Dorothy Parker, a successful writer. Dealing with a troubled marriage to a drug addict, she finds solace in the genuine friendship of Robert Benchley, a colleague at Vanity Fair. The "Vicious Circle" successfully stages an improvisational theatrical performance, leading Dorothy to cross paths with Charles MacArthur. Their relationship results in abandonment and an abortion, further shaping her sharp and skeptical character.

Amidst depression, Dorothy attempts suicide, but Robert intervenes, choosing not to pursue a romantic involvement due to fear of potential heartbreak. Without the prospect of love, Dorothy and Robert navigate separate paths, seeking solace in different relationships and experiences. In 1945, Dorothy discovers Robert's death from cirrhosis of the liver, adding another layer of hardship. Attempts at psychoanalysis fail to alleviate the darkness within her. In 1958, aged and increasingly isolated in New York, she receives a significant literary award.

== Cast ==
- Jennifer Jason Leigh as Dorothy Parker
- Matthew Broderick as Charles MacArthur
- Campbell Scott as Robert Benchley
- Peter Gallagher as Alan Campbell
- Jennifer Beals as Gertrude Benchley
- Andrew McCarthy as Eddie Parker (Edwin Pond Parker II)
- Wallace Shawn as Horatio Byrd
- Martha Plimpton as Jane Grant
- Sam Robards as Harold Ross
- Lili Taylor as Edna Ferber
- James LeGros as Deems Taylor
- Gwyneth Paltrow as Paula Hunt
- Nick Cassavetes as Robert Sherwood
- David Thornton as George S. Kaufman
- Heather Graham as Mary Kennedy Taylor
- Tom McGowan as Alexander Woollcott
- Chip Zien as Franklin P. Adams
- Gary Basaraba as Heywood Broun
- Jane Adams as Ruth Hale
- Stephen Baldwin as Roger Spalding
- Matt Malloy as Marc Connelly
- Rebecca Miller as Neysa McMein
- Jake Johannsen as John Peter Toohey
- Amelia Campbell as Mary Brandon Sherwood
- David Gow as Donald Ogden Stewart
- Leni Parker as Beatrice Kaufman
- J. M. Henry as Harpo Marx
- Stanley Tucci as Newt Hunter
- Mina Badie as Joanie Gerard
- Randy Lowell as Alvan Barach

Given the historical impact of many of the people portrayed in the film, the ensemble nature of the cast led to opening credits displaying all 30 actors listed above. Other historical characters, in brief appearances, included portrayals by Keith Carradine as Will Rogers, Jon Favreau as Elmer Rice, lead character Robert Benchley's grandson – Jaws author Peter Benchley – as Frank Crowninshield, Malcolm Gets as F. Scott Fitzgerald and Gisele Rousseau as Polly Adler.

== Production ==
=== Development ===
Director Alan Rudolph was fascinated with the Algonquin Round Table as a child when he discovered Gluyas Williams' illustrations in a collection of Robert Benchley's essays. Speaking in 1995, he said "the Algonquin Hotel round table, what it symbolised, and the ripple effect that went out from it, was probably up there in the 50 most significant events of the century". After making The Moderns, a film about American expatriates in 1920s Paris, Rudolph wanted to tackle a fact-based drama set in the same era. He began work on a screenplay with novelist and former Washington Star journalist Randy Sue Coburn about legendary writer Dorothy Parker. Coburn had written a novelisation of Rudolph's Trouble in Mind and she and Rudolph had previously collaborated on two scripts together. She said she "basically wrote [Mrs Parker] on my own and then he came in and started adding things by the time it went into production."

In 1992, Rudolph attended a Fourth of July party hosted by filmmaker Robert Altman, who introduced him to actress Jennifer Jason Leigh. Rudolph was surprised by her physical resemblance to Parker and was impressed by her knowledge of the Jazz Age. Leigh was so committed to doing the film that she agreed to make it for "a tenth of what I normally get for a film".

The screenplay originally focused on the platonic relationship between Parker and Robert Benchley, but this did not appeal to any financial backers. There still was no interest even when Altman came on board as producer. The emphasis on Parker was the next change to the script, but Rudolph still had no luck finding financing for "a period biography of a literate woman."

Altman used his clout to persuade Fine Line Features and Miramax—two studios he was making films for—to team, with the former releasing Mrs. Parker and the Vicious Circle domestically and the latter handling foreign distribution. Altman claimed that he forced the film to be made by putting his own money into it, adding, "I put other projects of mine hostage to it. I did a lot of lying."

=== Filming ===
Rudolph shot the film in Montreal because the building facades in its old city most closely resembled period New York City. Full financing was not acquired until four weeks into principal photography.

The film's large cast followed Leigh's lead and agreed to work for much lower than their usual salaries. Rudolph invited them to write their own dialogue, which resulted in a chaotic first couple of days of principal photography. Actor Campbell Scott remembered "Everyone hung on to what they knew about their characters and just sort of threw it out there."

Actress Jennifer Beals discussed this in her appearance on the Jon Favreau program Dinner for Five, where she stated that while much dialogue was improvised in the style of the real-life characters the actors were playing, many of these characters were not integral to the plot. As such, many of the actors had much larger parts that were edited down to nearly nothing in the film’s final cut.

During the film’s 40-day shoot, the cast stayed in a run-down hotel dubbed Camp Rudolph and engaged in all-night poker games. Leigh chose not to participate in these activities, preferring to stay in character on and off camera. She did a great amount of research for the role and said "I wanted to be as close to her as I possibly could." To this end, Leigh stayed at the Algonquin Hotel for a week and read Parker's entire body of work. In addition, the actress listened repeatedly to the two existing audio recordings of Parker in order to perfect the writer's distinctive voice. Leigh found that Parker "had a sensibility that I understand very, very well. A sadness. A depression."

Leigh later called it "a really fun movie to work on. I loved being her. I loved pretending to believe that I was that brilliant and quippy and miserable and in love all the time. It was a fun place to live."

The original cut of the film included a scene that showed the origin of the Round Table, a party held by Alexander Woollcott after World War One. However this was removed as, according to Coburn, "It just wasn’t the real heart of it to begin with."

== Release ==
A rough cut of Mrs. Parker and the Vicious Circle was screened at the 1994 Cannes Film Festival where it divided film critics. Coburn recalled "I remember going to the screening before walking down the red carpet, and Altman asked me ‘did people love it’ and I had to say, ‘well it was pretty mixed’. Some people did, but I didn’t get an overwhelming sense." It was rumored afterwards that Leigh re-recorded several scenes that were too difficult to understand because of her accent but she denied that this happened. The film was an Official Selection at the festival and was nominated for the Palme d'Or.

== Reception ==
On Rotten Tomatoes, it has a 76% approval rating based on 33 reviews, with an average score of 6.3/10. Coburn later said "everybody had high hopes that it might be a critical hit, and it kinda was. It did well critically."

=== Awards ===
For her performance in the film, Leigh was nominated for both the Golden Globe Award for Best Actress in a Motion Picture – Drama and Independent Spirit Award for Best Female Lead.

=== Year-end lists ===
- 4th – Michael Mills, The Palm Beach Post
- 6th – Desson Howe, The Washington Post
- 10th – Scott Schuldt, The Oklahoman
- Top 10 (listed alphabetically, not ranked) – Jimmy Fowler, Dallas Observer
- Top 10 (not ranked) – Betsy Pickle, Knoxville News-Sentinel
- Honorable mention – Jeff Simon, The Buffalo News
- Honorable mention – Glenn Lovell, San Jose Mercury News
- Honorable mention – Michael MacCambridge, Austin American-Statesman
