= The Home Girl =

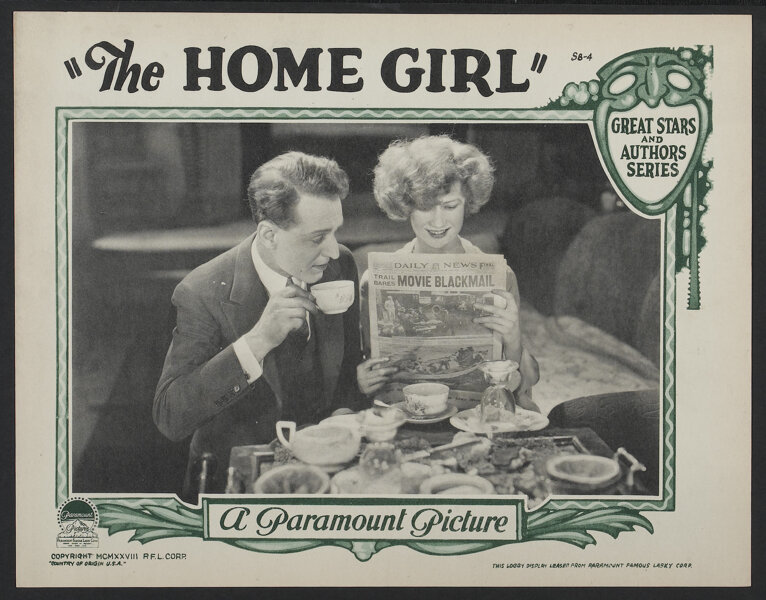
- Lobby card
- Directed by: Edmund Lawrence
- Written by: Edna Ferber (story)
- Produced by: Paramount; Daniel Frohman
- Starring: Margalo Gillmore; Otto Kruger; Miriam Hopkins
- Distributed by: Paramount Pictures
- Release date: December 1, 1928
- Running time: 20 minutes
- Country: United States
- Language: Silent (English intertitles)

The Home Girl is a 1928 American silent short film directed by Edmund Lawrence and starring Margalo Gillmore, Otto Kruger, and Miriam Hopkins. It was made by Paramount Pictures as part of their 'Great Stars and Authors' series, with The Home Girl being the 4th installment. It is based on a story by Edna Ferber. Miriam Hopkins was a well known Broadway actress at this time and she later signed a long term and successful contract with Paramount after the advent of talking pictures.

== Cast ==
- Margalo Gillmore
- Otto Kruger
- Miriam Hopkins
- Sylvia Field
- Vincent Lopez - Orchestra leader

== Preservation ==
A print of The Home Girl is preserved at UCLA Film & Television Archive.
