= William W. Woollcott =

Ink-and-paste manufacturer

William W. Woollcott (24 March 1876 – 2 February 1949) was an ink-and-paste manufacturer who lived in Baltimore, Maryland. Known as "Willie" he was the brother of Alexander Woollcott, and was married to Marie Bloede—daughter of Victor G. Bloede—a good friend of H. L. Mencken and a non-performing member of the Saturday Night Club. He was known for being a "wit and a bon vivant in his own right" but is best remembered for writing the anthem of the Saturday Night Club whose opening line Mencken included in his New Dictionary of Quotations: "I am a one hundred percent American! I am, God damn, I am!" The song took on a brief life of its own gaining "wide popularity among the unregenerate" during the 1920s.
