= Neysa McMein =

American artist (1888–1949)

Neysa Moran McMein
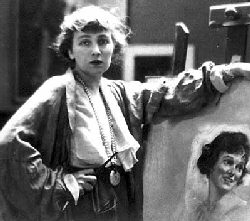
- McMein in 1923
- Born: Marjorie Moran (Note: Her first name was also spelled Margery.); January 24, 1888; Quincy, Illinois, US
- Died: May 12, 1949 (aged 61); New York City, US
- Education: The School of The Art Institute of Chicago; Art Students League of New York
- Known for: Artist and illustrator
- Spouse: John G. Baragwanath
- Elected: Hall of Fame, Society of Illustrators; 1984

Neysa Moran McMein (born Marjorie Frances McMein; January 24, 1888 – May 12, 1949) was an American illustrator and portrait painter who studied at The School of The Art Institute of Chicago and Art Students League of New York. She began her career as an illustrator and during World War I, she traveled across France entertaining military troops with Anita P. Wilcox and Jane Bulley and made posters to support the war effort. She was made an honorary non-commissioned officer in the United States Marine Corps for her contributions to the war effort.

McMein was a successful illustrator of magazine covers, advertisements, and magazine articles for national publications, like McClure's, McCall's, The Saturday Evening Post, and Collier's. McMein created the portrait of a fictional housewife "Betty Crocker" for General Mills. She was also a successful portrait painter who painted the portraits of presidents, actors, and writers.

McMein entertained members of the Algonquin Round Table at her West 57th Street studio, where she was known for her active parties. Life magazine wrote an article about adult party games, which featured stories about McMein's parties. She had an open marriage to John G. Baragwanath, during which she had affairs with Charlie Chaplin and George Abbott. Baragwanath described their marriage as a successful one based upon a deep friendship.

She was inducted into the Society of Illustrators' Hall of Fame in 1984, 35 years after her death. McMein was one of 20 Society of Illustrators' artists to have their work published on a United States Postal Service Collectible Stamp sheet in 2001.

== Early life and education ==
Marjorie Frances McMein was born in Quincy, Illinois, on January 24, 1888. She was the daughter of Harry Moran and Isabelle Parker McMein. Harry Moran was a reporter before he worked for the McMein Publishing Company, a family business. Due to his alcoholism, his relationship with his wife was strained.

McMein had musical, acting, and artistic talent. After graduating with honors in 1907 from the Quincy High School, she attended The School of the Art Institute of Chicago. McMein worked at a large millinery firm, where she became lead designer. In 1911 or 1913, she went to New York City and after a brief stint as an actress in several of Paul Armstrong's plays, she turned to commercial art. On the advice of a numerologist, she adopted the name Neysa. John Baragwanath, her husband, stated that she chose the name Neysa after meeting one of Homer Davenport's fillies at his stables. Whatever the original impetus for the change, McMein thought that the name Neysa "had a commercial value" above that of her birth name. McMein studied at the Art Students League of New York in 1914.

== Career ==
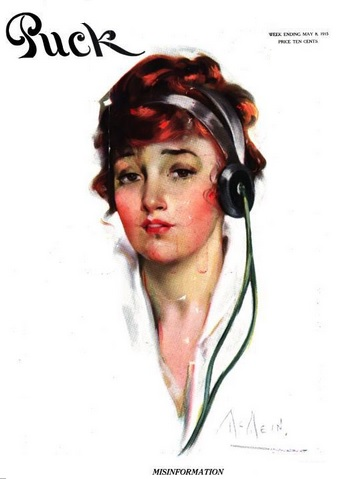
Neysa McMein, Misinformation, May 8, 1915, Puck (magazine)

McMein sold her first drawing to the Boston Star in 1914. However, an earlier illustration by McMein was used in 1912 by Associated Sunday Magazines, dated November 10, 1912. It was used as the cover art in both the St Louis Republic and the Buffalo Courier on that date. She created Harry Horowitz's portrait in 1915 before he was executed for Herman Rosenthal's murder. That year, she sold an illustration for the cover of The Saturday Evening Post and her Misinformation illustration appeared on the May 8, 1915, cover of Puck magazine. She became known for her portrayal of "All American Girls."

McMein made posters for French and United States governments during World War I, as did Thelma Cudlipp, Helen Hyde and Mary Brewster Hazelton. Posters that she made also were used by the American Red Cross in its fund-raising campaigns.

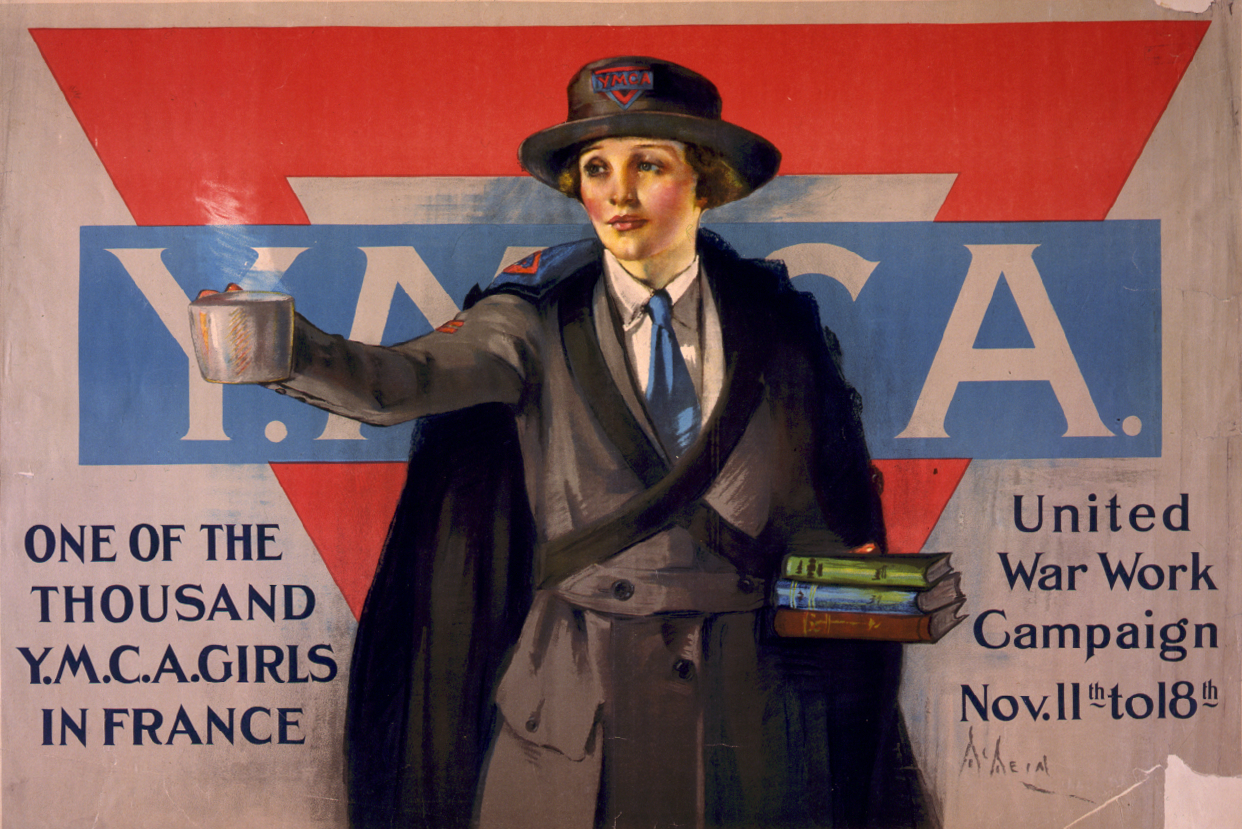
Neysa McMein, One of the thousand Y.M.C.A. girls in France, recruiting poster, 1918

She traveled across France to entertain the troops in 1918. Of her time at the Western Front, McMein said, "Since I have lived through air bombing I never will be frightened by anything on earth. The terror of air raids cannot be imagined. They are heralded by the blowing of sirens and the ringing of church bells, and amid this din the lights are extinguished and then suddenly come the bombs, falling no one knows where. The noise they made is worse than that of the battles."

McMein made portraits of some of the soldiers, drew cartoons, and colored the design of the Indian head insignia that was then used by the 93rd Bomb Squadron to denote the number of German planes that a given plane shot down by drawing a German black cross over one of the bear teeth in a necklace worn around the Indian head. (Note: The first Indian head was painted on the plane of 1st Lt. Charles R. D'Olive after he shot down the first German aircraft for the 93rd Pursuit Squadron on September 12, 1918. Over the next six days, D'Olive shot down four more planes, making him an ace.) She returned to the United States to care for her mother after her father died. While in Quincy, she spoke at two fund-raising drives. "[McMein] was the main attraction. The theater was filled. She was an excellent speaker; very witty and clever," according to Sarah Carney. For her efforts supporting the U.S. war effort, McMein was appointed an honorary non-commissioned officer in the United States Marine Corps, one of only three women to be so honored.

In 1917, noted poet Berton Braley wrote Front Page Stuff about her magazine cover art, the last portion of which is:

Yes, Neysa, we're strong for your stuff,

Your girls who have sense and discretion;

Keep on for we can't get enough

Of maidens who give that impression.

Your vogue is far more than a fad

So gather the fame—and the tin;

Nope, there is no charge for this ad

Of covers by Neysa McMein.

—Berton Braley

Her illustrations appeared on the covers and within articles for McClure's magazine by 1919. (Note: The stories that she illustrated for McClure's that year included "Armistice Days at the Front" (January) and "Repopulating the Earth" (May). Her photograph also appeared in the August 1919 issue.) By the 1920s, McMein and Jessie Willcox Smith were two of the major women magazine illustrators of their time. Together, they created hundreds of covers for McCall's and Good Housekeeping magazines. Joseph Bernt, author of the article "The Girl on the Magazine Cover: The Origins of Visual Stereotypes in American Mass Media" found that both women and Norman Rockwell generally portrayed women in covers and illustrations as mothers, with scenes centered around children, during the 1920s and 1930s. Within the covers of the magazine were illustrations made by the three artists to sell consumer products, like Orange Crush, Ivory soap, Chesterfield cigarettes, and Holeproof Hosiery. Following World War I, increased emphasis of family life was presented in mass media following a period when woman's suffrage and the New Woman were depicted in publications from the late 1800s according to Bernt. Carolyn Kitch, author of the book The Girl on the Magazine Cover, finds, however, that McMein created illustrations of confident, modern New Women for her magazine covers, while Jessie Wilcox Smith concentrated more steadily on children.

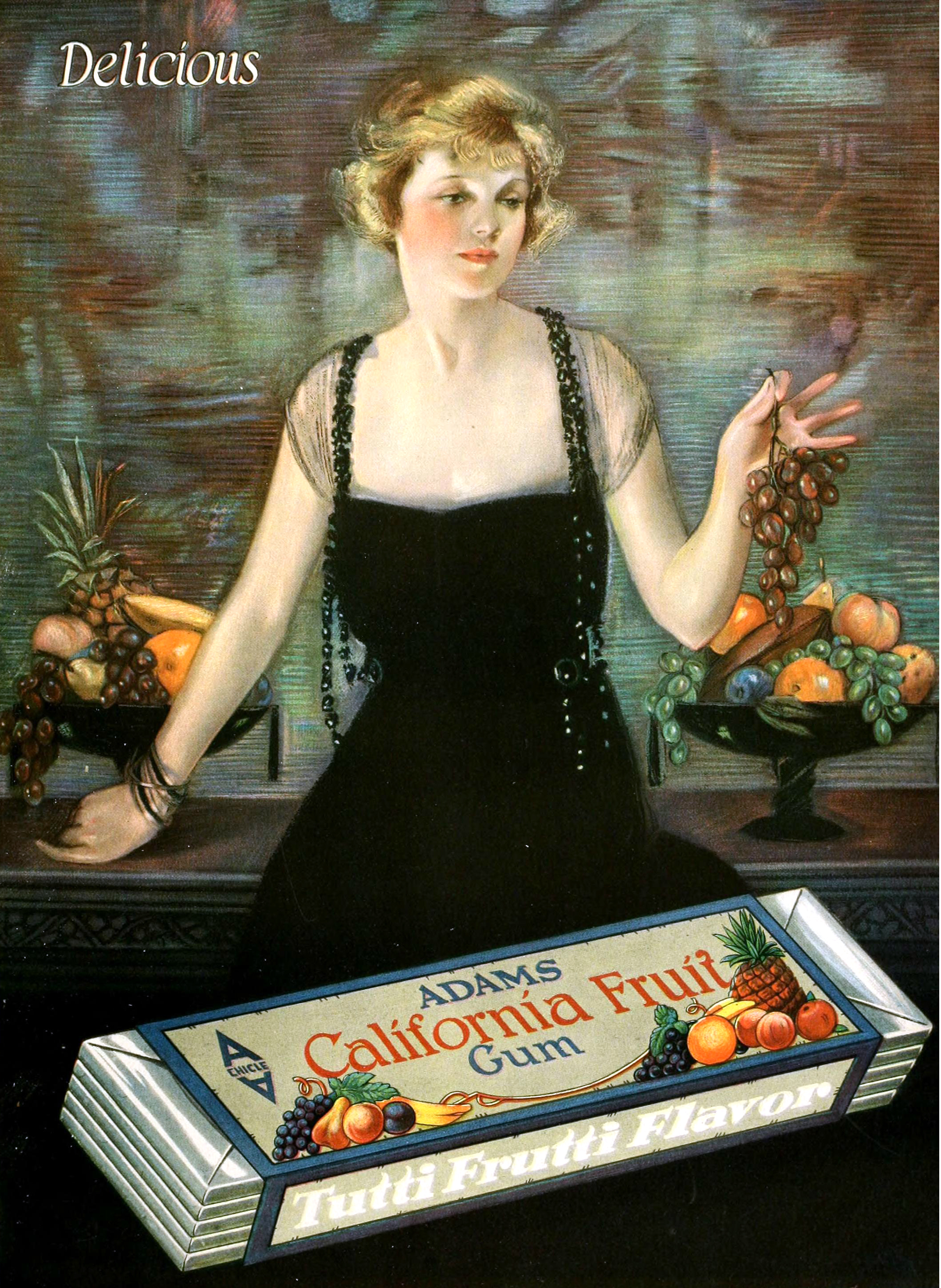
Neysa McMein, Adams California Fruit Gum, advertisement, 1920, Motion Picture Classic magazine

From 1923 through 1937, McMein created all of McCall's covers. She also supplied work to National Geographic, Woman's Home Companion, Collier's, and Photoplay. McMein earned up to $2,500 (estimated equivalent to $41,276 in 2025) (Note: Please note that the inflation calculation is incapable of inflating capital expenses, government expenses, or the personal wealth and expenditure of the rich.) per cover illustration. She created advertising graphics for Cadillac, Lucky Strike cigarettes and Palmolive soap.

Together with artists Howard Chandler Christy and Harrison Fisher, McMein constituted the jury for Motion Picture Classic magazine's "Fame and Fortune" contest of 1921/1922, which discovered the It girl Clara Bow. Other promotional activities including judging Coney Island beauty contests or opening movie houses. McMein designed silk textiles in the mid-1920s, three examples of which are in the collection of the Metropolitan Museum of Art. In December 1929, she consulted with Studebaker's design department, with five other women artists and decorators.

General Mills commissioned her to create the image of Betty Crocker, a fictional housewife in 1936. She created an official portrait of Betty Crocker by combining features of the home economists employed by the company, which helped reinforce that Crocker was a real person. The image of the "ageless" 32-year-old was used in advertising and on packaging until 1955 when Hilda Taylor painted an updated Betty, who also wore bright red and white clothing. Like the Betty Crocker image, "Miss McMein was herself a kind of American demigoddess: the most courted of commercial artists, hostess in her New York studio to all of the 'Algonquin wits'—Benchley, Parker, Franklin P. Adams—a wit herself. Sophistication lay rouge-deep upon the personalities of her cover girls; beneath lay reassuring testimonials to health and wholesomeness," wrote James Gray, author of Business Without Boundary: The Story of General Mills.

In 1942, McMein collaborated with Alicia Patterson Guggenheim to create a comic strip, called "Deathless Deer." The strip starred a "deathless" Egyptian princess who awakens in modern New York City. McMein, while talented, was unfamiliar with comic strip drafting and conventions, and Guggenheim's writing suffered with the format. The strip was a commercial and critical failure; it was discontinued in 1943.

In April 1938, McCall's Magazine did not renew McMein's contract to produce illustrations for the magazine. By then, magazines could cost-effectively publish color photographs using four-color machines. McMein entered the field of portraiture, at first using pastels to depict Dorothy Parker, Edna St. Vincent Millay, and Helen Hayes. She painted portraits of presidents Herbert Hoover and Warren G. Harding, author Anne Morrow Lindbergh, and actors Charlie Chaplin and Beatrice Lillie. McMein also painted Katharine Cornell, Kay Francis, Janet Flanner, Dorothy Thompson, Anatole France, Charles Evans Hughes and Count Ferdinand von Zeppelin. She mentored photographer Lee Miller.

== Personal life ==
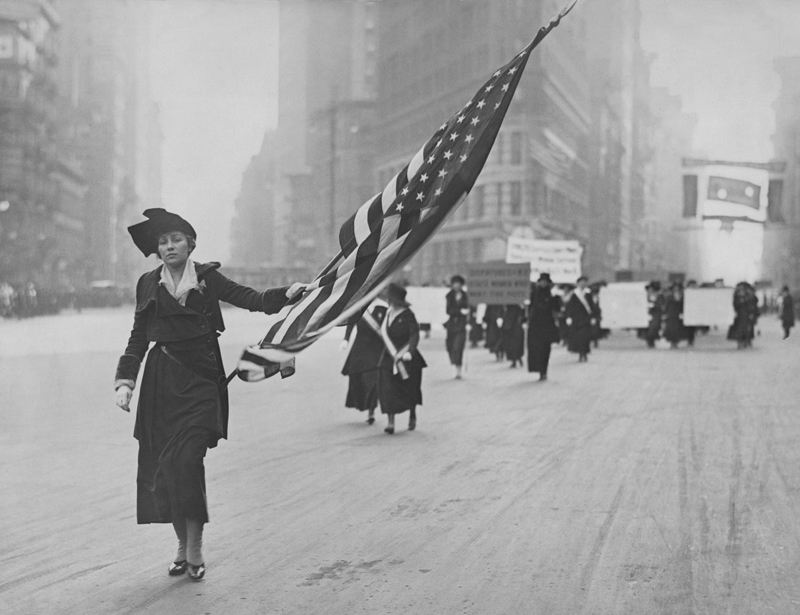
Neysa McMein carrying the flag at a suffrage parade, 1917.

McMein‘s father died in 1918 while she was overseas entertaining the troops. She moved her mother Belle from Quincy, Illinois, to live with her in New York. She was an "ardent supporter" of women's political, sexual, and economic rights. By 1920, McMein had walked in suffrage parades, traveled overseas extensively, and had ridden in Count Zeppelin's dirigible. She rode across an Arab desert with a woman journalist and friend and was proposed to by an Arab sheik in Algiers. McMein, who was a talented musician, had written an opera by that time. In 1921, McMein was among the first to join the Lucy Stone League, an organization that fought for women to preserve their birth names after marriage in the manner of Lucy Stone.

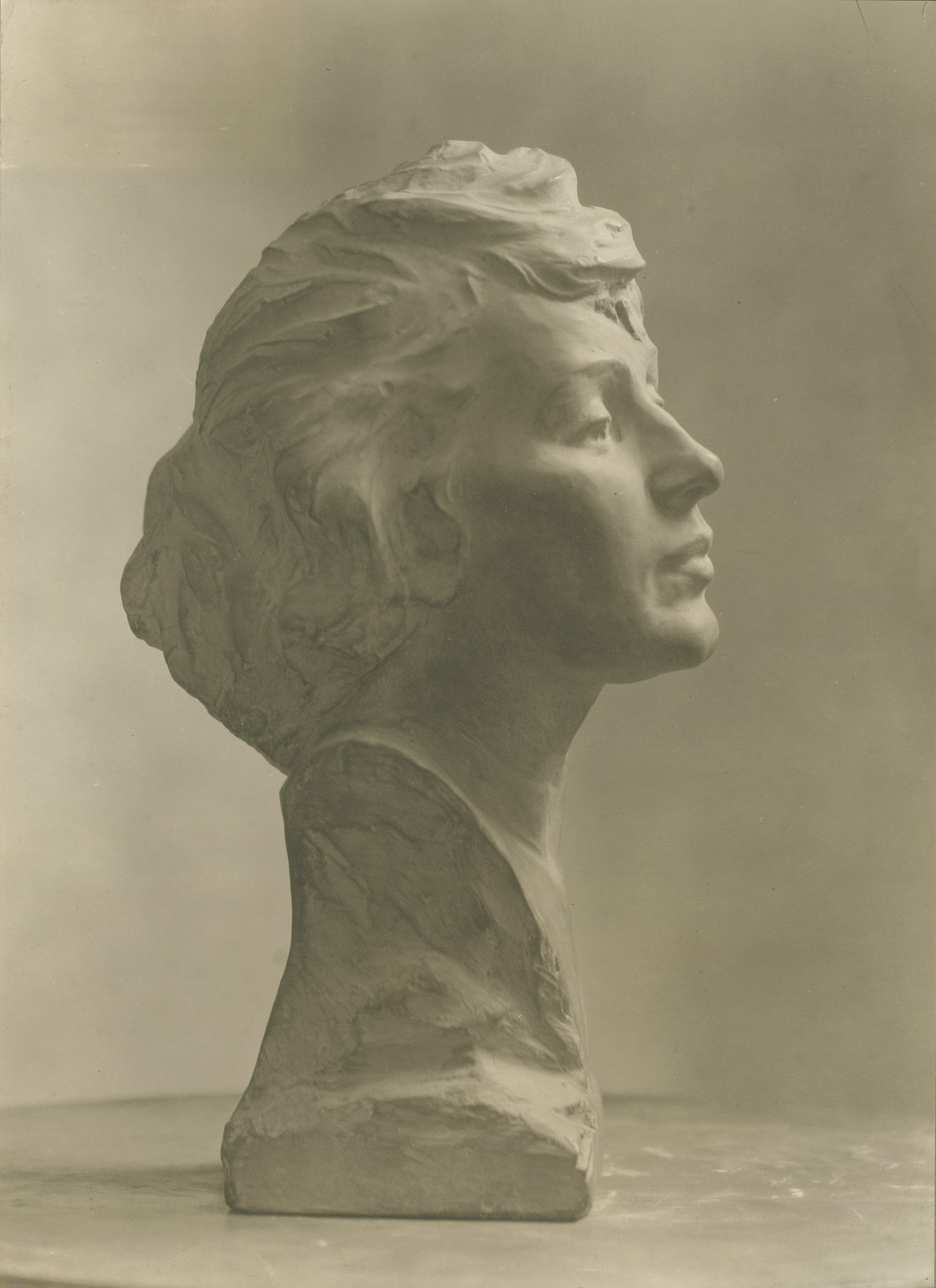
Sally James Farnham, Neysa Moran McMein, 1920, sculpture

McMein—described as a tall, athletic, grave, and beautiful red-head (Note: Carolyn Burke describes her as a blonde.)—became a regular member of the Algonquin Round Table set, formed after the end of the war. Her West 57th Street studio in New York City became an "outpost" to the Algonquin Hotel, which appealed to the "Bohemian" nature of its members, which included Dorothy Parker, Alexander Woollcott, Edna Ferber, Irving Berlin, Robert Sherwood, Franklin Pierce Adams, Robert Benchley, Alice Duer Miller, Harpo Marx, and Jascha Heifetz. She was prone to working in her smock at an easel as her guests enjoyed lively discussions and piano playing. Berlin finished composing What'll I Do at McMein's piano during one of her Round Table parties. McMein provided the cover illustration of Berlin's biography by Alexander Woollcott. Walt Disney, Ethel Barrymore, Cole Porter, George Gershwin, H. G. Wells, and George Bernard Shaw were friends. Dorothy Parker moved in with McMein in 1920 before renting an apartment in the same building.

McMein's mother died in 1923. The same year, McMein married John G. Baragwanath, a mining engineer and author, whom she met at a party given by Irene Castle. Baragwanth was interested in the striking, fine-featured woman playing the piano while others danced and sang around her. McMein and Baragwanath had a daughter Joan in 1924.

Theirs was an open marriage, and though the proprieties generally were observed, there were exceptions. In his memoirs, the lyricist and publicist Howard Dietz recalled hearing that on one occasion, when Neysa noticed that her model for the day was impatient to leave, she asked: "Have you got a heavy date?" Model: "Yes, with a great guy, Jack Baragwanath." Meanwhile, Neysa was involved for several years with the Broadway director George Abbott, leading Alexander Woollcott to say that "we now call Neysa’s place in Port Washington the 'Abbottoir.'" She also had affairs with Robert Benchley, Charlie Chaplin, who had a house near her cottage in Port Washington, and a platonic relationship with Irving Berlin. This occurred during a period when "[w]omen are for the first time demanding to live the forbidden experience directly and draw conclusions on this basis," according to Beatrice Hinkle in an article for The Nation.

McMein lived a varied life in search of fun. She interspersed her life as an artist with riding on the back of an elephant in a parade, and enjoying parties. She hosted parties with games for adults to entertain artists, writers, actors and other celebrities. Her guests—like Bing Crosby, Anne Shirley, Robert Young, and Bennett Cerf—engaged in games like a quickfire, multiple team version of charades called "The Game", that is sometimes attributed to McMein. The spelling game, where each person on a team wore a sign with one letter and played against another team so see who could arrange themselves the fastest in the proper order to spell a word, was played at her parties. McMein and the games that she employed at her parties were featured in a Life magazine article in 1946. McMein also entertained at the house she bought with Baragwanath on the North Shore of Long Island in Sands Point.

In 1942, she broke her back by falling downstairs during a sleepwalking episode. McMein was then required to have surgery to graft part of her hip to her spine.

== Death ==
McMein died of cancer on May 12, 1949, in New York City and was survived by daughter Joan and her husband John Baragwanath.

In her will, McMein bequeathed monies to purchase works of arts annually by the Whitney Museum of American Art. The museum bought 72 purchases from 1956, none of which were McMein's works. Like other illustrators' works, her illustrations were not considered fine art. In 1984, McMein was inducted into the Society of Illustrators' Hall of Fame.

The United States Post Office released a 20-stamp collection in February 2001 that are based upon works created by 20 Society of Illustrators' artists, including McMein, Rockwell Kent, Al Parker, Howard Pyle, Jessie Smith, and Joseph Leyendecker.

== Collections ==
- Central School of Speech and Drama – Beatrice Lillie, c. 1948–1949
- Delaware Art Museum – Possibly a Cover Illustration, pastel on paper, 1919
- Library of Congress – One of the thousand Y.M.C.A. girls in France. Y.M.C.A., poster, 1918
- Alice Marshall's Women History Collection, Penn University, Harrisburg
  - McCall's, June 1925
  - McCall's, August 1929
  - Advertisement for San-Tox Preparations, The American Magazine, 1919
- Metropolitan Museum of Art
  - American Print: Birches, silk textile, 1925
  - American Print: Hollywood, silk textile, 1925
  - Piece, silk textile, 1927
- Museum of the City of New York, Theatre Collection – Miss Katharine Cornell
- Princeton University Poster Collection 1863–1948
  - One of the thousand Y.M.C.A. girls in France. Y.M.C.A., poster, 1918
  - Woman in cape and robe holding a sword and an oar, Grand Military Naval Meet and Ball, Benefit of Women's Oversea Hospitals, poster, 1917
- Quincy Art Center, Illinois

== Published works ==
Illustrator

- Mary Brecht Pulver (1914). The Spring Lady. Cover illustration by Neysa McMein. The Bobbs-Merrill Company.
- George S Kaufman & Marc Connelly (1921). Dulcy: A Comedy in Three Acts. Frontispiece by Neysa McMein. New York; London: G.P. Putnam's Sons.
- Woollcott, Alexander (1925). The Story of Irving Berlin. Portrait by Neysa McMein. New York: Da Capo.

Author

- James W Evans; Gardner L Harding; Neysa McMein; Anita Parkhurst; Ethel Caroline Rundquist (1921). Entertaining the American Army: The American Stage and Lyceum in the World War. New York: Association Press. OCLC 911248.
- McMein, Neysa. Games I Like to Play (1930s). New York: McCall's Magazine. OCLC 57680511.

== In popular culture ==
McMein was portrayed by actress Rebecca Miller in the film Mrs. Parker and the Vicious Circle (1994).

== See also ==
- YWCA USA
