= John Peter Toohey =

American dramatist

John Peter Toohey (September 18, 1879 - November 7, 1946, New York City) was an American writer and publicist. He is best known as a member of the Algonquin Round Table. According to Ross and The New Yorker by Dale Kramer, Toohey supplied the name for the famous magazine. According to the story, when several Algonquin types were brainstorming for a name, he asked them about who the magazine was intended for. When he was told "New Yorkers," he replied, "Then call it The New Yorker"—and he returned to his lunch.

== Biography ==
He was born on September 18, 1879, in Binghamton, New York. He was a reporter for the Scranton Tribune and around 1900 joined the Washington Post and the New York Evening World before moving into publicity.

In 1918 he was a manager for Klaw and Erlanger.

He co-wrote two comedic plays produced on Broadway, Swifty (1922) with Walter C. Percival, and Jonesey (1929) with Anne Morrison.

From 1930 to 1942, Toohey was "general representative," i.e., the chief publicist, of the Broadway producer Sam H. Harris's company.

He died on November 7, 1946, in New York City.

== Film portrayal ==
Toohey was portrayed by actor Jake Johannsen in the film Mrs. Parker and the Vicious Circle (1994).
