= While Rome Burns =

1934 book by Alexander Woollcott

- Title page for While Rome Burns (1934)
- Author: Alexander Woollcott
- Publisher: Grosset & Dunlap
- Publication date: 1934

While Rome Burns is a book collecting some of the 20th century American critic Alexander Woollcott's writings for the New Yorker and other magazines. The title is a reference to the popular legend that Nero played the fiddle while Rome burned. The book was published by Grosset & Dunlap in 1934. Vincent Starrett hailed it as one of the 52 "Best Loved Books of the Twentieth Century". Woollcott promoted the book on his radio show and his pointed critiques, quips, and asides gained enough of an audience to make it a bestseller. The New York Times reviewed it. The book includes accounts of his travels to Japan and Russia.

A sequel, Long, Long Ago, was published after Woollcott's death in 1943.
