= Ruth Gillmore =

American actress (1899–1976)

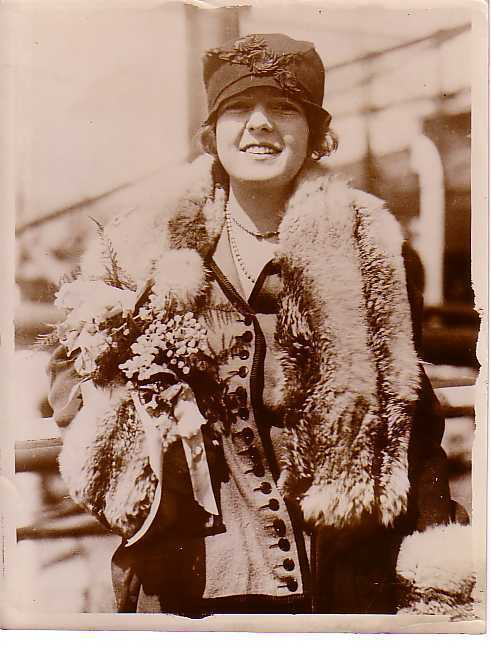
- Ruth Gillmore
- Born: Ruth Emily Gillmore; 26 October 1899; London, England, U.K.
- Died: 12 February 1976 (aged 76); Nantucket, Massachusetts, U.S.
- Other name: Ruth Gillmore Sonino
- Occupation: Actress
- Years active: 1918–1935
- Spouse: Max Sonino

Ruth Emily Gillmore (26 October 1899 – 12 February 1976) was an English-born American stage actress.

== Early years ==
Gillmore was the daughter of Frank Gillmore, former president of Actors' Equity, and actress Laura MacGillivray and the sister of actress Margalo Gillmore. Her great-aunt was the British actor-manager Sarah Thorne, and her great-uncles were the actors Thomas Thorne and George Thorne. She was a fourth-generation actor on her father's side.

== Career ==
Gillmore's first professional appearance was as an unborn child in Maurice Maeterlinck's The Betrothal in New York City in 1918. Her later theatrical appearances included Edie Upton in The Robbery (1921), Jeanne in The Nest (1922), The '49ers (1922), No Sirree! (1922), Gail Carlton in No More Frontiers (1931), and Mrs Howard in The Farmer Takes a Wife (1934–35).

She married theatrical producer Max Sonino in Florence, Italy, in 1926. He produced the play No More Frontiers (1931), in which she appeared. Together they translated the Italian plays Finding Oneself (1933) by Luigi Pirandello, and Giovacchino Forzano's Gutlibi and The Bells of San Lucio. Their daughter was Mildred Sonino.

Gillmore taught speech and drama at the Buckley School.

== Personal life and death ==
With her sister Margalo Gillmore she was a member of the Algonquin Round Table.

Gillmore died in Nantucket, Massachusetts, on February 12, 1976, aged 76.
