= Thomas Thorne =

English actor and theatre manager

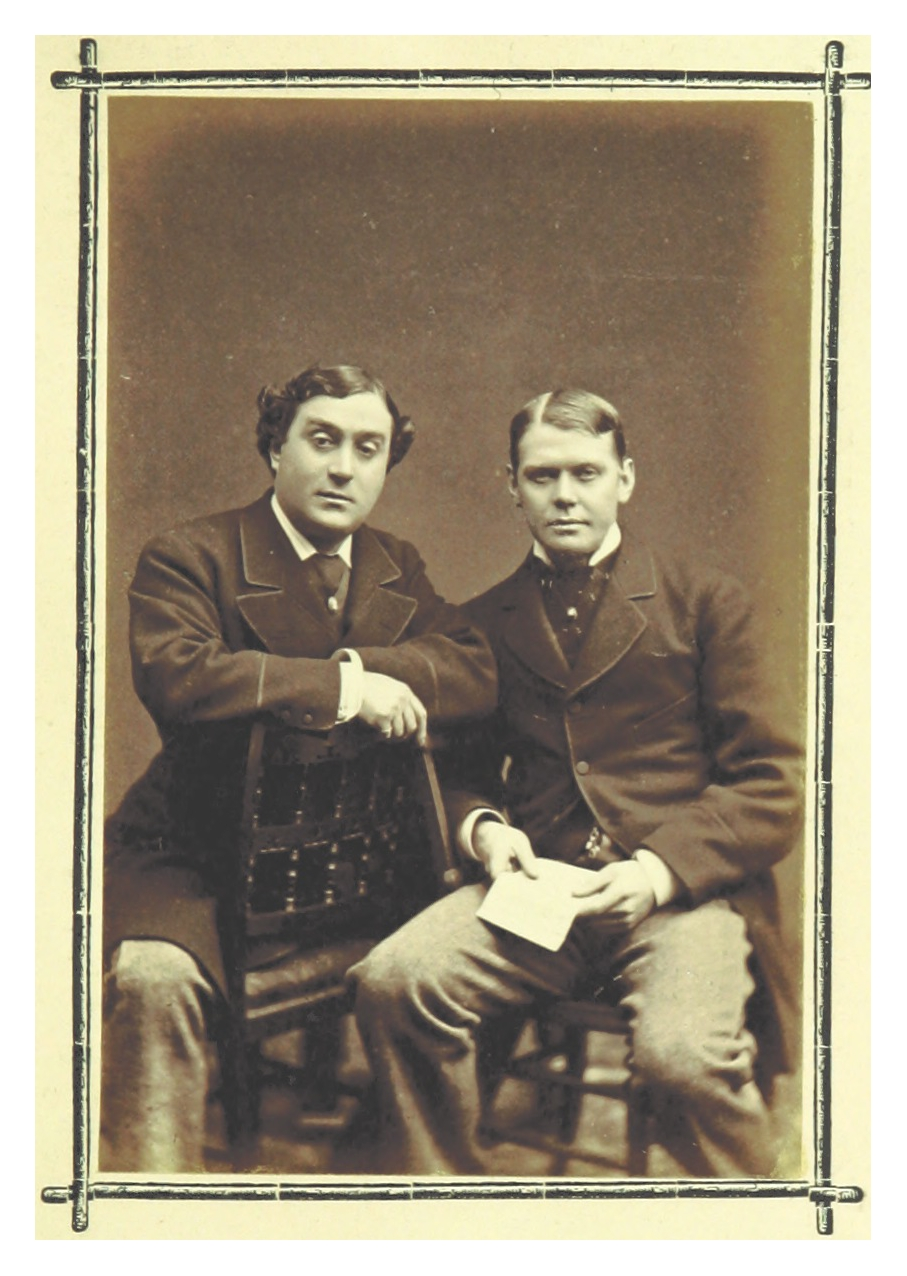
David James & Thomas Thorne (1877)

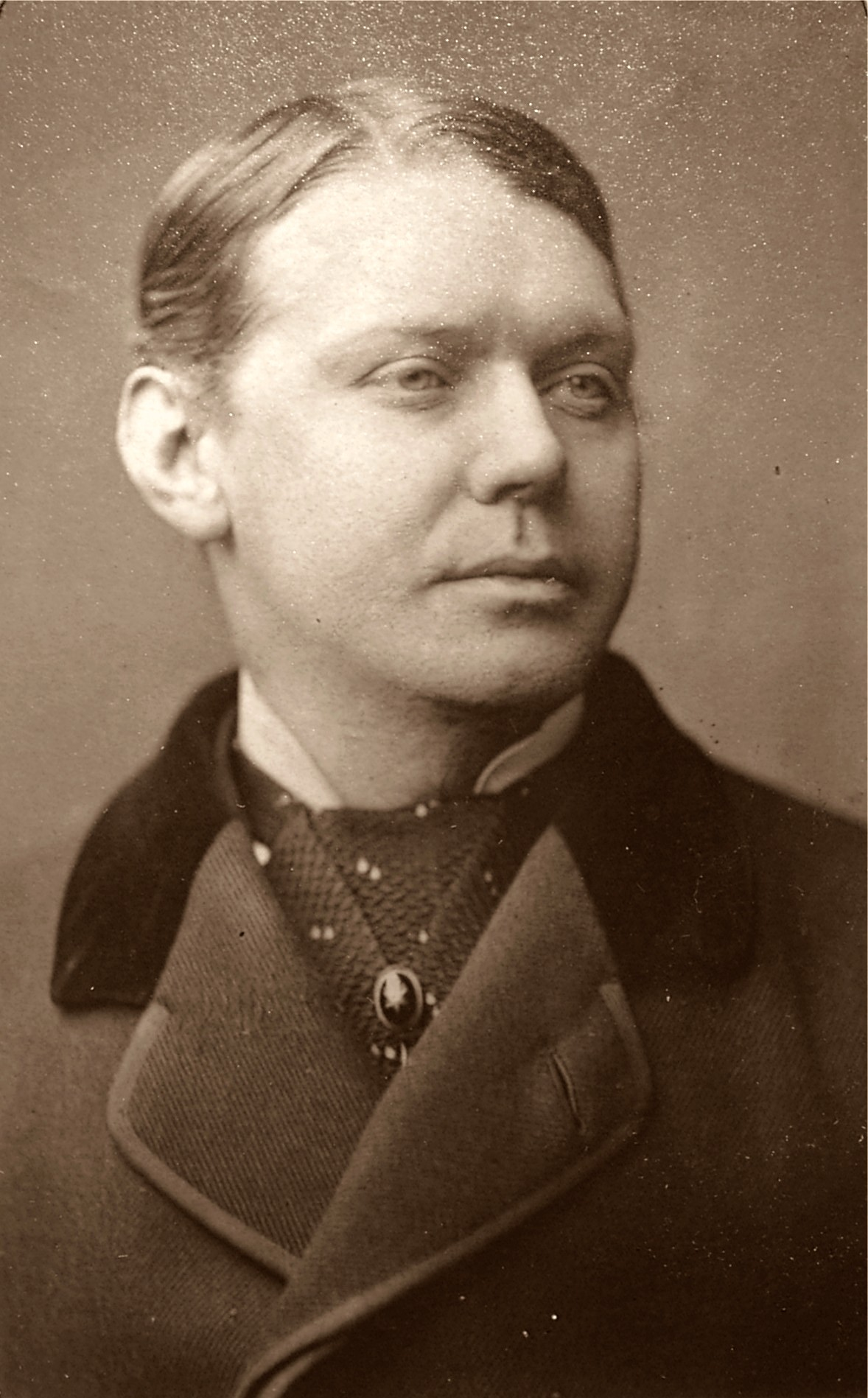
Thomas Thorne

Thomas Thorne (1841–1918) was an English actor and theatre manager. Thomas Thorne was one of the founding managers of London's Vaudeville Theatre, along with David James and Henry James Montague, and performed leading roles in many of the productions there. His father was Richard Samuel Thorne, who managed the Surrey Theatre. His older sister, Sarah Thorne, was an actress. His younger brother, George Thorne, was also an actor, best known for his performances in the comic baritone roles of the Savoy Operas with the D'Oyly Carte Opera Company. His nephew was the actor Frank Gillmore, and his great-nieces the actresses Ruth Gillmore and Margalo Gillmore.

Thorne was married to Adelaide Newton, whom he had met when they were both actors with the Royal Strand Theatre, but the marriage was not a happy one. According to Erroll Sherson, Thomas Thorne died penniless and insane.

== Sources ==
- Sherson, Erroll, London's lost theatres of the nineteenth century, Ayer Publishing, 1925 pp. 224–225. ISBN 0-405-08969-4.
- National Portrait Gallery, London, Thomas Thorne in Saints and Sinners
