= The Lifted Veil (film) =

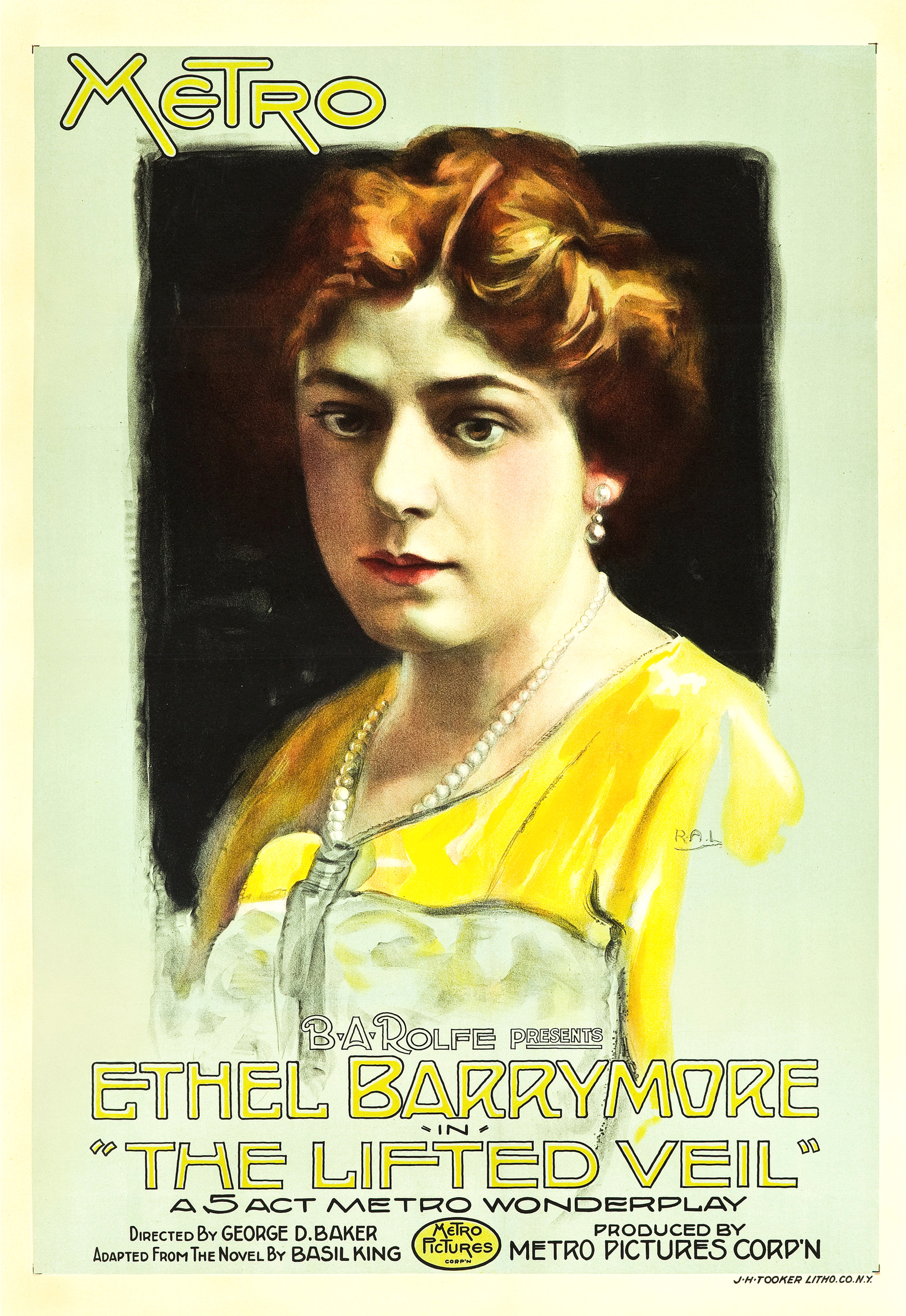
- Film poster
- Directed by: George D. Baker
- Written by: Albert S. LeVino (scenario)
- Based on: The Lifted Veil by Basil King
- Produced by: B. A. Rolfe
- Starring: Ethel Barrymore; William B. Davidson; Frank Gillmore
- Cinematography: Joseph Schelderfer
- Distributed by: Metro Pictures
- Release date: September 10, 1917
- Running time: 5 reels
- Country: United States
- Language: Silent (English intertitles)

The Lifted Veil is a 1917 American silent drama film produced by B. A. Rolfe and distributed by Metro Pictures. It is based on a 1917 novel The Lifted Veil by Basil King, an author popular with women readers. Stage star Ethel Barrymore, under contract to Metro, appears in her eighth silent feature film, which is now lost.

== Plot ==
As described in a film magazine, Clorinda Gildersleeve (Barrymore) has drifted into an affair with a married man, Leslie Palliser (Ellis). She goes to Europe to forget and meets Malcolm Grant (Davidson), a young surgeon, who falls in love with her. However, because of her affair with Palliser, she believes she has no right to accept his love. She hears an excellent sermon preached by Reverend Arthur Bainbridge (Gillmore) on the text "Woman, go and sin no more" and appeals to the minister in regards to Malcolm's attentions. She sends Malcolm to see the minister, but he does not disclose Clorinda's secret. The minister interests her in a home for erring girls and Clorinda adopts one of the inmates. Reverend Bainbridge urges her to marry Malcolm, but during the ceremony she falls in a faint. That night, however, she writes to the minister announcing her marriage to Malcolm and their departure for France, where he will do surgical work and she will become a nurse.

== Cast ==
- Ethel Barrymore as Clorinda Gildersleeve
- Frank Gillmore as Reverend Arthur Bainbridge
- William B. Davidson as Malcolm Grant
- Robert Ellis as Leslie Palliser
- Ilean Hume as Pansy Wilde
- Maude Hill as Margaret Palliser
- Ricca Allen as Mrs. Scattergood
- Myra Brooks as Mrs. Wedlock (credited as Myra Brooke)
- George Stevenson as Butler

== Reception ==
Like many American films of the time, The Lifted Veil was subject to cuts by city and state film censorship boards. The Chicago Board of Censors issued an Adults Only permit for the film.
