= Franklin P. Adams =

American newspaper columnist (1881–1960)

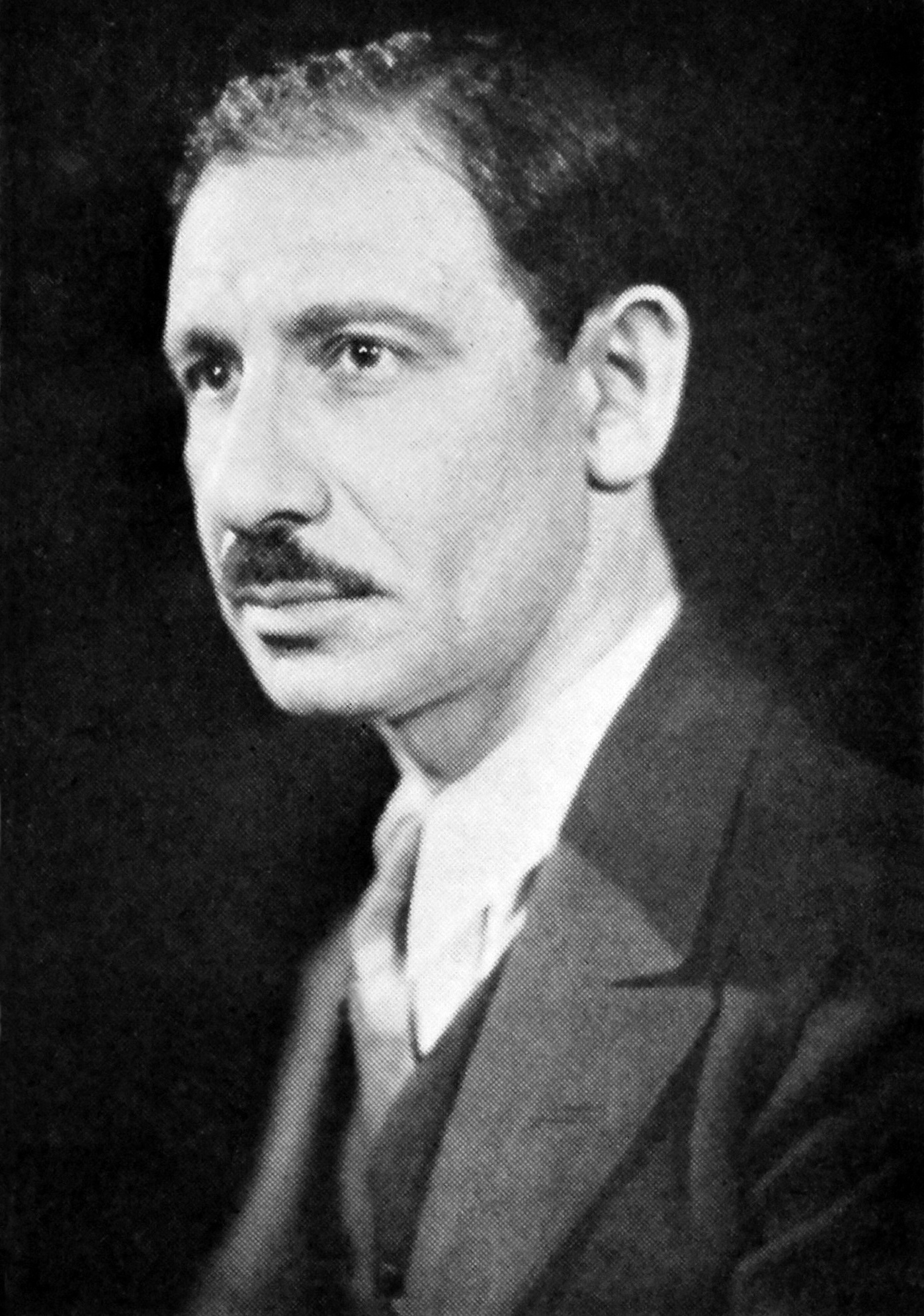
- Adams in the 1940s
- Born: Franklin Leopold Adams; November 15, 1881; Chicago, Illinois, U.S.
- Died: March 23, 1960 (aged 78); New York, New York, U.S.
- Education: University of Michigan
- Occupation: Columnist
- Writing career
- Years active: 1903–1941
- Genres: Light verse, sportswriting
- Notable works: "Baseball's Sad Lexicon" "The Conning Tower"

Franklin Pierce Adams (November 15, 1881 – March 23, 1960) was an American columnist known as Franklin P. Adams and by his initials F.P.A. Famed for his wit, he is best known for his newspaper column, "The Conning Tower", and his appearances as a regular panelist on radio's Information Please. A prolific writer of light verse, he was a member of the Algonquin Round Table of the 1920s and '30s.

== New York newspaper columnist ==
Adams was born Franklin Leopold Adams to German Jewish immigrants Moses and Clara Schlossberg Adams in Chicago on November 15, 1881. He changed his middle name to "Pierce" when he had a bar mitzvah at age 13. Adams graduated from the Armour Scientific Academy (now Illinois Institute of Technology) in 1899, attended the University of Michigan for one year and worked in insurance for three years.

Signing on with the Chicago Daily Journal in 1903, he wrote a sports column and then a humor column, "A Little About Everything." The following year he moved to the New York Evening Mail, where he worked from 1904 to 1913 and began his column, then called "Always in Good Humor," which used reader contributions.

During his time on the Evening Mail, Adams wrote what remains his best known work, the poem "Baseball's Sad Lexicon," a tribute to the Chicago Cubs' double play combination of "Tinker to Evers to Chance". In 1911, he added a second column, a parody of Samuel Pepys's Diary, with notes drawn from F.P.A.'s personal experiences. In 1914, he moved his column to the New-York Tribune, where it was famously retitled "The Conning Tower" and was considered to be "the pinnacle of verbal wit".

During World War I, Adams was in the U.S. Army, serving in military intelligence. He also wrote the column, "The Listening Post," for Stars and Stripes editor Harold Ross. While serving in the army, he became a captain. He returned to the Tribune after the war. He began working for the New York World in 1922. His column appeared there until the paper merged with the New York Telegram in 1931. He returned to his old paper, which was then called the New York Herald Tribune, and stayed until 1937. His career as a columnist ended with the New York Evening Post in September 1941.

During its long run, "The Conning Tower" featured contributions from such writers as Robert Benchley, Edna Ferber, Moss Hart, George S. Kaufman, Edna St. Vincent Millay, John O'Hara, Dorothy Parker, and Deems Taylor. Having one's work published in "The Conning Tower" could launch a career. This was true for Dorothy Parker and James Thurber. Parker quipped that the columnist "raised me from a couplet." She dedicated to Adams, her poetry book Not So Deep as a Well. It contained many poems previously published in "The Conning Tower."

Adams is credited with coining the term "aptronym" for last names that fit a person's career or job title. A variant spelling is "aptonym." He was known for being overly concerned with grammar and accuracy, which earned him the nickname "the comma-hunter of Park Row." Many writers lived on Park Row, the location of many newspaper buildings.

His favorite recreational sport for decades was tennis. He was a longtime member of the University Heights Tennis Club. It hosted an annual open singles tournament. Adams reached the third round in both 1914 and 1919. "The Conning Tower" often included tournament tidbits. Adams served as a line judge in the U.S. National Championships (US Open) in 1922. It was for a semifinal match between Bill Johnston and Vincent Richards. He was also a line judge at the Nationals, in a semifinal match between Bill Tilden and Vincent Richards, 1924.

== Satires ==
- No Sirree!, staged for one night only in April 1922, was a take-off of a then-popular European touring revue called La Chauve-Souris directed by Nikita Balieff. Robert Benchley is often credited as the first person to suggest the parody of Balieff's group.

No Sirree! had its genesis at the studio of Neysa McMein, which served as something of a salon for Round Tablers away from the Algonquin. Acts included: "Opening Chorus" featuring Woollcott, Toohey, Kaufman, Marc Connelly, Adams, and Benchley with violinist Jascha Heifetz providing offstage, off-key accompaniment; "He Who Gets Flapped," a musical number featuring the song "The Everlastin' Ingenue Blues" written by Dorothy Parker and performed by Robert Sherwood accompanied by "chorus girls" including Tallulah Bankhead, Helen Hayes, Ruth Gillmore, and Lenore Ulric; "Zowie, or the Curse of an Akins Heart"; "The Greasy Hag, an O'Neill Play in One Act" with Kaufman, Connelly and Woollcott; and "Mr. Whim Passes By - An A. A. Milne Play."

- F.P.A. often included parodies in his column. His satire of Edgar Allan Poe's poem "Annabel Lee" was later collected in his book, Something Else Again (1910):

"Soul Bride Oddly Dead in Queer Death Pact"
"High-Born Kinsman Abducts Girl from Poet-Lover—Flu Said to Be Cause of Death—Grand Jury to Probe"
Annabel L. Poe of 1834 1/2 3rd Ave., the beautiful young fiancee of Edmund Allyn Poe, a magazine writer from the South, was found dead early this morning on the beach off E. 8th Street. Poe seemed prostrated and, questioned by the police, said that one of her aristocratic relatives had taken her to the "seashore," but that the cold winds had given her "flu," from which she never "rallied." Detectives at work on the case believe, they say, that there was a suicide compact between the Poes and that Poe also intended to do away with himself. He refused to leave the spot where the woman's body had been found.

== Radio ==
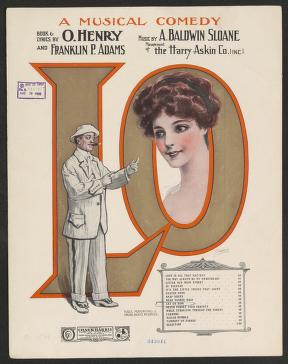
Lo A Musical Comedy Sheet Music

As a panelist on radio's Information Please (1938–48), Franklin P. Adams was the designated expert on poetry, old barroom songs and Gilbert and Sullivan, which he always referred to as Sullivan and Gilbert. A running joke on the show was that whenever asked to identify the author of a quotation that he didn't know, Adams would suggest Shakespeare. Information Please's creator/producer Dan Golenpaul auditioned Adams for the job with a series of sample questions, starting with: "Who was The Merchant of Venice?" Adams: "Antonio." Golenpaul: "Most people would say Shylock." Adams: "Not in my circle." John Kieran was the real Shakespearean expert and could quote from his works at length.

A translator of Horace and other classical authors, F.P.A. also collaborated with O. Henry on Lo, a musical comedy.

== Death and burial ==
Adams died in Manhattan and was cremated at the Ferncliff Crematory in Hartsdale. The ashes were buried in Ferncliff Cemetery but have no marker.

== Film portrayal ==
Adams was portrayed by the actor Chip Zien in the film Mrs. Parker and the Vicious Circle (1994).

== Books ==
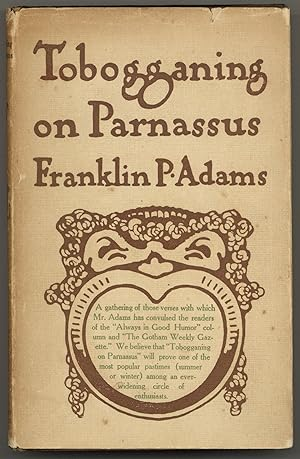
Tobogganing on Parnassus

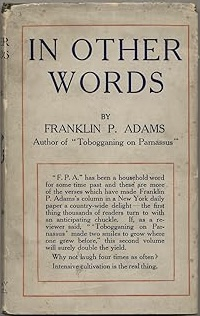
In Other Words

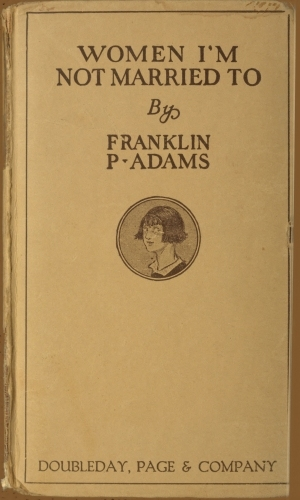
Women I’m Not Married To

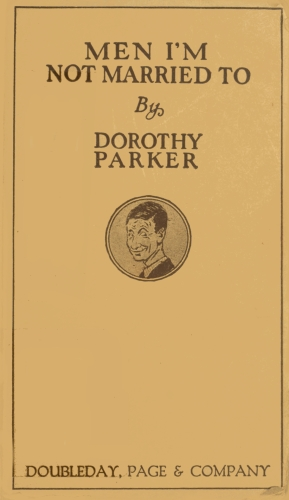
Men I’m Not Married To

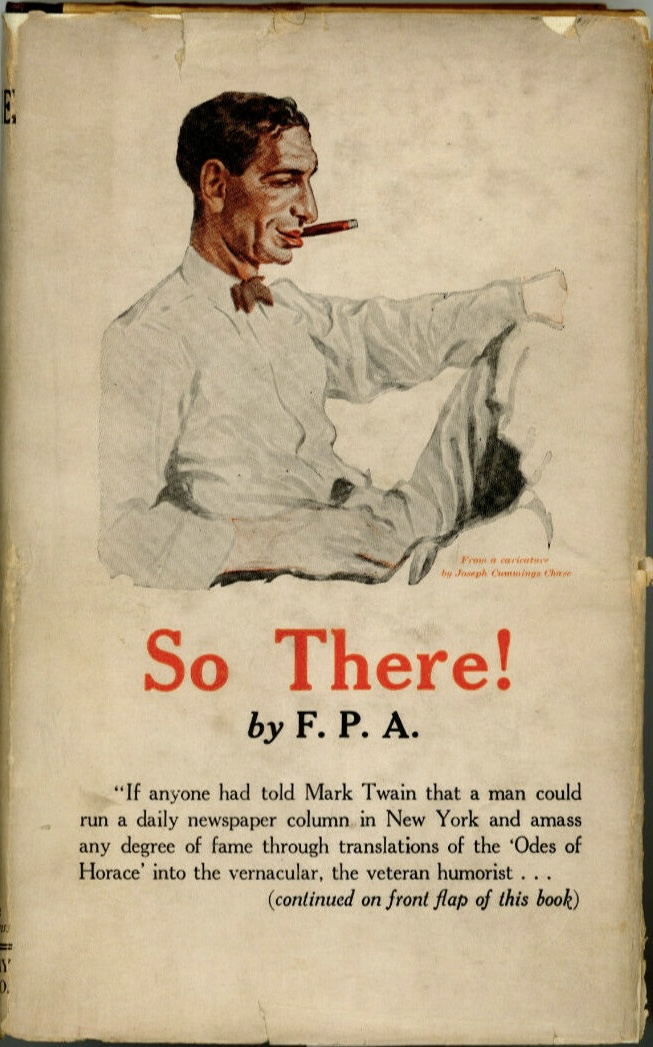
So There !

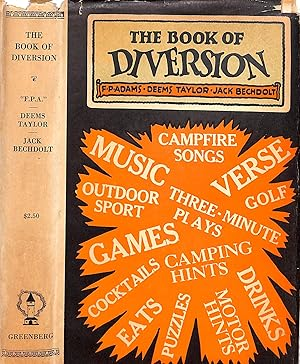
The Book of Diversion

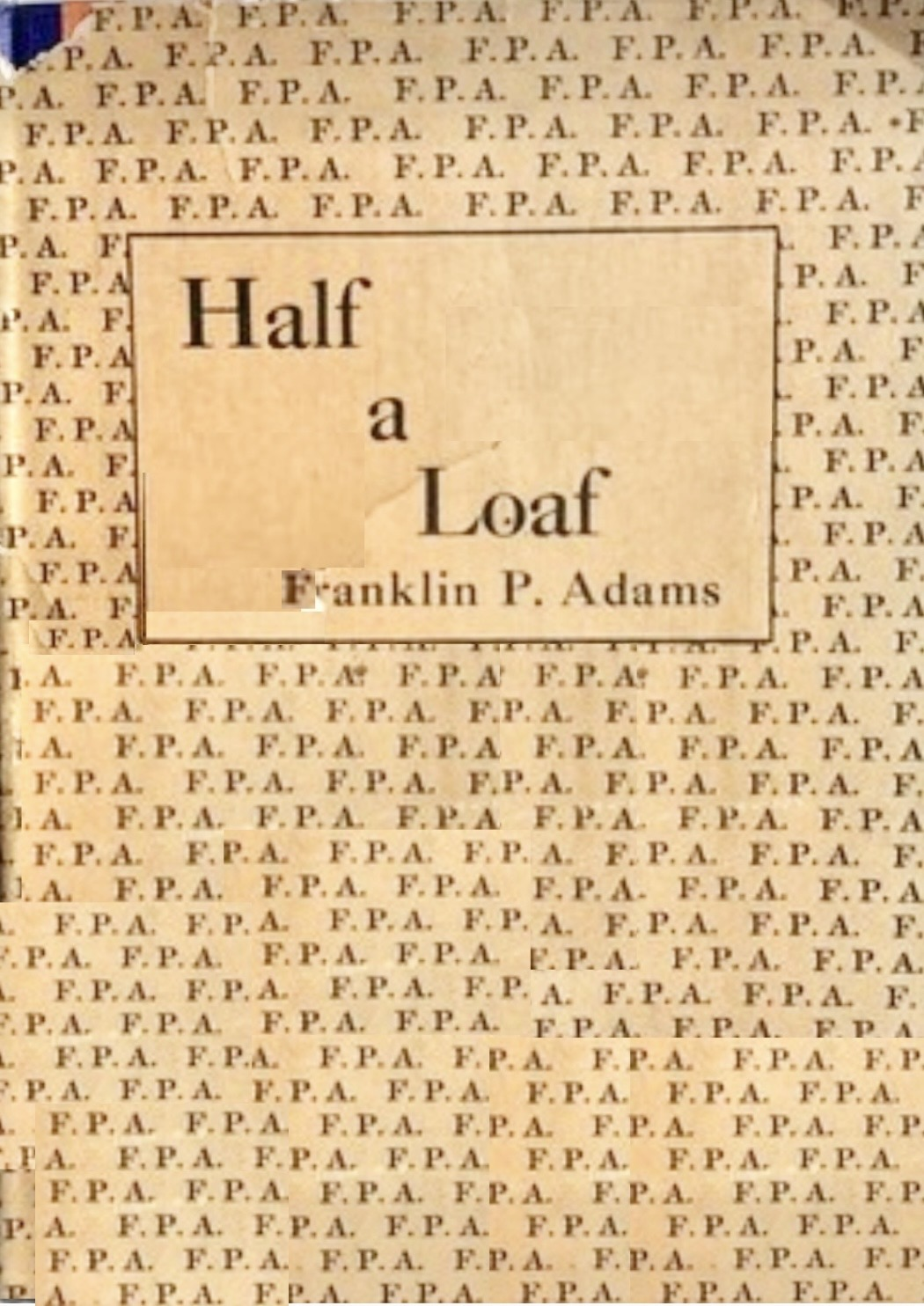
Half a Loaf

- In Cupid's Court (1902)
- By and Large (1908)
- Tobogganing on Parnassus (1911)
- In Other Words (1912)
- Weights and Measures (1914; poetry)
- Among Us Mortals with W. E. Hill (1916)
- Something Else Again (1920; poetry)
- Overset (1922)
- Men I’m Not Married To; Women I’m Not Married To with Dorothy Parker (1922; humor)
- So There! (1923)
- So Much Velvet (1924)
- The Book of Diversion compiled with Taylor and Bechdolt (1925)
- The Conning Tower Book (1926)
- Half a Loaf (1927)
- The Second Conning Tower Book (1927)
- Answer This One with Harry Hansen (1927; trivia)
- Column Book of F.P.A. (1928)
- Sins Of New York As "exposed" By The Police Gazette, by Edward Van Every with intro by Adams (1930)
- Christopher Columbus and Other Patriotic Verses (1931)
- The Diary of Our Own Samuel Pepys (2 volumes, 1935; columns)
- The Melancholy Lute (1936)
- The Kalmar Ruby Song Book by Harry Ruby and Bert Kalmar with Franklin P. Adams, Robert Benchley, Irving Berlin, Marc Connelly, Moss Hart, Nunnally Johnson, Groucho Marx, James K. McGuinness (1936)
- Heywood Broun as He Seemed to Us by John L Lewis, Franklin P. Adams, Herbert Bayard Swope, Fiorello H. LaGuardia, Carl Randau, Lewis Gannett, Edna Ferbner, John Kieran, Charles Horowitz, Karl Virag, Morris L. Ernst, Quentin Reynolds, Theodore S. Kenyon, Frank Sullivan, Gardner Jackson, Edward G. Robinson, Kenneth G. Crawford, A.J. Isserman, Edward McNamara, Father Edward Dowling, and Rollin Kirby (1940)
- Innocent Merriment: An Anthology of Light Verse (1942)
- Nods and Becks (1944)

=== Articles ===
- F. P. A. (February 21, 1925). "Short-story Scenarios". The New Yorker. Vol. 1, no. 1. p. 19.
- — (October 9, 1926). "A Day in the Courts". The New Yorker. Vol. 2, no. 41. p. 29.
- — (March 5, 1927). "Grant". The Talk of the Town. The New Yorker. Vol. 3, no. 10. p. 20.
- F. P. A.; Harold Ross & James Thurber (April 30, 1927). "Mot". The Talk of the Town. The New Yorker. Vol. 3, no. 18. p. 19.
- F. P. A. & E. B. White (April 7, 1927). "Another". The Talk of the Town. The New Yorker. Vol. 3, no. 19. p. 19.
- Adams, Franklin P. (January 1, 1938). "I Remember, I Remember". The New Yorker. Vol. 13, no. 46. p. 31.

== Quotes ==
- "I find that a great part of the information I have was acquired by looking up something and finding something else on the way."
- "To err is human; to forgive, infrequent."
- "Elections are won by men and women chiefly because most people vote against somebody rather than for somebody."
- ”You can learn many things from children. How much patience you have, for instance.”

== See also ==
- Eugene Field
- Edgar Guest
- Nick Kenny
- O. O. McIntyre
