= George Thorne (actor) =

English singer and actor (1856–1922)

Thorne as Ko-Ko in The Mikado

George Tyrell Thorne (6 January 1856 – 24 July 1922) was an English singer and actor, best known for his performances in the comic baritone roles of the Savoy Operas with the D'Oyly Carte Opera Company, on tour in the UK, Continental Europe and South Africa, and in the original New York productions. He is credited with playing the role of Jack Point in The Yeomen of the Guard as a tragic character rather than the more comic interpretation of the creator of the part, George Grossmith.

== Life and career ==
=== Early years ===
Thorne was born on 6 January 1856 into a theatrical family. His father was Richard Samuel Thorne, who managed the Surrey Theatre next door to the family house. Thorne was one of five brothers, all of whom became actors. The second eldest, Thomas, was an actor-manager, who ran the Vaudeville Theatre in London for more than twenty years. There were four sisters, three of them actresses and the eldest, Sarah, a theatre manager, who ran the Theatre Royal, Margate, in succession to her father.

Thorne made his stage début at the age of two when he was carried on in the burlesque Medea at the theatre in Margate. He told an interviewer in 1895:

The celebrated Frederick Robson was playing Medea(!), and he, or rather she, took me on to the stage as one of her two children. That was when I made my bow – or rather, my squeak – before an audience, and, as I shall be 40 in January I can claim to have been 38 years on the stage.

His first adult appearance was at the age of fifteen at the Margate theatre in what he called "a little thing of my own concoction, somewhat in the pantomime way". After touring with his sister's company (1870–1873), he joined John Coleman's repertory company in Leeds (1873); appeared in the Covent Garden pantomime (1874–75), and played in Dublin, in a version of Cinderella which he wrote and directed. He subsequently appeared in Manchester, Liverpool, Birmingham and Glasgow, and then at the Corinthian Theatre, Calcutta, (1876) where he reportedly played 104 parts in six months. In 1879–80 he made his first visit to America, on a five-month tour, in a repertoire of Shakespeare and classical comedies with Mrs Scott Siddons. His roles included Touchstone in As You Like It, on which he later drew for his characterisation of the jester Jack Point in The Yeomen of the Guard.

=== D'Oyly Carte years ===
as Robin in Ruddigore

Thorne joined a D'Oyly Carte touring company in the US 1881, playing Captain Felix Flapper in Billee Taylor. The theatre critic of a local newspaper described him as "an actor of more than average ability"; another praised him as "decidedly the funny feature of the opera".

Back in England, he toured as Blood-red Bill in Edward Solomon and Henry Pottinger Stephens's Claude Duval in early 1882 and then as Reginald Bunthorne in Patience in the same year. In 1883 he married the actress Beatrice Thomas, who toured with him as a chorister in the D'Oyly Carte company under the stage name Geraldine Thompson.

In 1884 Thorne appeared as Sir Joseph Porter in H.M.S. Pinafore, Major General Stanley in The Pirates of Penzance, and Bunthorne, with a D'Oyly Carte touring company, adding the roles of Lord Chancellor in Iolanthe and Ko-Ko in The Mikado in 1885.

In 1885 Thorne returned to New York to play Ko-Ko in The Mikado at the Fifth Avenue Theatre, where the company played until 1886. This production also included Geraldine Ulmar as Yum-Yum, Courtice Pounds as Nanki-Poo, and Fred Billington as Pooh-Bah. While in New York, Arthur Sullivan wrote a special comic orchestration for Thorne (stressing the bassoon part) as an encore to "The Flowers that Bloom in the Spring" (preserved in Sullivan's autograph score), performed in pantomime. Later, other D'Oyly Carte artists performed a pantomime encore.

Returning from America in 1886, Thorne toured the British provinces and Europe as Sir Joseph and Ko-Ko until 1887. He then returned to England to rehearse the new opera, Ruddigore. He gave two matinee performances as Robin Oakapple at the Savoy Theatre and then travelled to New York again to play Robin there with substantially the same troupe that had played in The Mikado in New York in 1885–86. From 1887 to 1890 (with a break in late 1889 to early 1890, when he contracted typhoid fever), he toured playing Bunthorne, Ko-Ko, Sir Joseph, and later the Major General and Jack Point in The Yeomen of the Guard. Thorne originated the tragic ending for that character, contrasting with the less serious interpretation by the role's creator, George Grossmith. This was later adopted by most portrayers of the role. He said that Point was his favourite of the roles.

From 1890 to 1896 Thorne was the principal comedian with a D'Oyly Carte touring company, playing John Wellington Wells in The Sorcerer, Sir Joseph, the Major General, Bunthorne, the Lord Chancellor, King Gama in Princess Ida, Ko-Ko, Jack Point, and the Duke of Plaza-Toro in The Gondoliers. He also played Bumbo in The Nautch Girl (1892). In 1891 he played Ko-Ko in a Royal Command Performance for Queen Victoria at Balmoral Castle in September 1891

From 1896 to 1897 Thorne was on the first D'Oyly Carte tour of South Africa, playing his usual roles. He then toured in Britain in 1898 to 1899. He had two further engagements with D'Oyly Carte: as John Wellington Wells, Sir Joseph Porter, General Stanley, Bunthorne, the Lord Chancellor, Gama, Ko-Ko, Jack Point, and the Duke of Plaza-Toro between February and September 1898, and as Point again in January 1899. He says, in his memoir Jots (1897), that he had occasion to play the Judge in Trial by Jury, which would mean that he played the leading comic role in all 13 extant Gilbert and Sullivan operas, but he does not say when or where. He left the D'Oyly Carte company in 1899.

=== Playwright; author; film ===
Thorne wrote several pantomimes, some burlesques, two comic operas, and adaptations of several of Charles Dickens's novels for the stage. He also wrote a volume of reminiscences, entitled Jots (1897).

He appeared in Tit Willow (1907) British (B&W), a short film directed by John Morland. It was distributed by Walturdaw Company in standard 35mm spherical 1.37:1 format, using the Cinematophone Sound-on-disc sound system (synchronised phonograph recording; Phonoscène).

=== Death ===
Thorne died in Edlesborough, Bedfordshire, in 1922 at the age of 66. He is buried at Kensal Green Cemetery, London.
