= Public relations campaigns of Edward Bernays =

The following is a list of public relations, propaganda, and marketing campaigns orchestrated by Edward Bernays (22 November 1891 – 9 March 1995).

Bernays is regarded as the pioneer of public relations. His influence radically changed the persuasion tactics used in campaign advertising and political campaigns.

Bernays was the nephew of Sigmund Freud. His early adoption of Freud's psychoanalytic theory was instrumental in defining the goals and strategies of public relations. Freud theorized that people are motivated by unconscious desires. To develop public relations, Bernays synthesized elements of Freud's work with Gustave Le Bon's researches into crowd psychology, and Wilfred Trotter's theories of herd instinct.

== Cigarettes ==
In the 1920s, it was considered taboo for women to smoke in public. George Washington Hill, president of the American Tobacco Company, realized that his company was missing a share of the market. He hired Bernays to change the taboo and persuade women to start smoking. Bernays contacted psychoanalyst Abraham Brill to understand the societal perceptions that discouraged women from smoking. Brill told him that for feminists, cigarettes were like "torches of freedom" that symbolized their nonconformity and freedom from male oppression.

Bernays used this information to build a strategy. He contacted a female friend and asked her to find a group of women to march in the New York City Easter Day parade. He asked her to tell the press that a group of women's rights marchers would light "Torches of Freedom". The women lit Lucky Strike cigarettes in front of the eager photographers. The New York Times (1 April 1929) printed: "Group of Girls Puff at Cigarettes as a Gesture of 'Freedom'".

In the 1930s, he attempted to convince women that Lucky Strike cigarettes' forest green pack was the most fashionable color. Letters were written to interior and fashion designers, department stores, and prominent women of society pushing green as the new hot color for the season. Balls, gallery exhibitions, and window displays all featured green after Bernays got through with them. The result was that green did indeed become a very popular color for the 1934 season and Lucky Strike kept their pack color and female clientele intact.

After his semi-retirement in the 1960s, he worked with the pro-health anti-smoking lawyer John Banzhaf's group, ASH and supported other anti-smoking campaigns.

== Water fluoridation ==
Bernays helped to convince the American public that water fluoridation was safe and beneficial to human health.

== Food ==
Bernays applied Freud's observations to convince the public, among other things, that bacon and eggs was the true all-American breakfast.

== Political propaganda ==
On October 17, 1924, Bernays once engineered a "pancake breakfast" with vaudevillians for Calvin Coolidge in what is widely considered one of the first overt publicity stunts for a US president.

Bernays's most extreme political propaganda activities were said to be conducted on behalf of the multinational corporation United Fruit Company (renamed Chiquita Brands International in 1984) and the U.S. government to facilitate the successful 1954 coup against the democratically elected president of Guatemala, Jacobo Arbenz Guzman. Bernays's propaganda (documented in the BBC documentary The Century of the Self), branding Arbenz as communist, was published in major U.S. media. According to a book review by John Stauber and Sheldon Rampton of Larry Tye's biography of Bernays, The Father of Spin: Edward L. Bernays & The Birth of PR, "the term 'banana republic' actually originated in reference to United Fruit's domination of corrupt governments in Guatemala and other Central American countries."

== Hygiene ==
When Venida, a hairnet manufacturer, hired Bernays' services, he started a campaign to convince women to grow their hair longer so they would buy more hairnets. Although the campaign failed to influence many women, it convinced government officials to require hairnets for certain jobs.

Bernays worked with Procter & Gamble for Ivory-brand bar soap. The campaign successfully convinced people that Ivory soap was medically superior to other soaps. He also promoted soap through sculpting contests and floating contests because the soap floated better than its competitors'.

In the 1930s, his Dixie Cup campaign was designed to convince consumers that only disposable cups were sanitary by linking the imagery of the overflowing cup with subliminal images of vaginas and venereal disease.

== Event promotion ==
In 1920, Bernays successfully hosted the first NAACP convention in Atlanta, Georgia. His campaign was considered successful because there was no violence at the convention. His campaign focused on the important contributions of African-Americans to Whites living in the South. He later received an award from the NAACP for his contribution.

In October 1929, Bernays was involved in promoting Light's Golden Jubilee. The event, which spanned across several major cities in the U.S., was designed to celebrate the 50th anniversary of Thomas Edison's invention of the light-bulb (though a form of light-bulb had been simultaneously invented by Joseph Swan). The publicity elements of the Jubilee–including the special issuance of a U.S. postage stamp and Edison's "re-creating" the invention of the light bulb for a nationwide radio audience – provided evidence of Bernays's love for big ideas and "ballyhoo". A follow-up event for the 75th anniversary, produced for television by David O. Selznick, was titled Light's Diamond Jubilee and broadcast on all four American TV networks on October 24, 1954.

Bernays was the publicity director of the 1939 New York World's Fair.

== The arts ==
In 1913, Bernays secured one of his first consulting contracts when American actor Richard Bennett hired him to defend Damaged Goods—a play addressing the social stigma of syphilis—against potential police interference and moral censorship. To navigate these obstacles, Bernays established a front organization called the Medical Review of Reviews Sociological Fund. While the organization purported to be a public health initiative aimed at fighting sexually transmitted disease, its primary function was to provide the play with social and moral legitimacy. By securing endorsements from influential figures such as John D. Rockefeller Jr. and Franklin D. Roosevelt, Bernays effectively neutralized opposition from censors. Although some critics, including the New York American, dismissed the production as "dull and almost unendurable," the campaign proved effective at the box office. It drew overflow audiences and eventually moved to Washington, D.C., where it was attended by Supreme Court justices and members of the President's cabinet.

In 1915, to prepare for the Ballets Russes' US tour, Sergei Diaghilev hired Bernays to convince American magazines to publish articles telling readers that ballet is fun to watch.

Bernays’ marriage to his professional partner, Doris E. Fleischman, in 1922 shows him integrating personal events into his professional work. At his suggestion, Fleischman registering under her maiden name when the couple checked into the Waldorf-Astoria, a move that challenged the social and hotel protocols of the era. The action, covered by over 250 newspapers, effectively branded Fleischman as a representative of independent identity for married women.

== See also ==
- Advertising campaign
- The Century of the Self (2002), a documentary series about Bernays and the invention of public relations
- Fundamental human needs
