= Hester Kaplan =

American novelist

- Born: Hester Margaret Kaplan
- Education: Barnard College (B.A.)
- Occupations: Novelist; writer
- Spouse: Michael Stein
- Parent(s): Anne Bernays Kaplan; Justin Kaplan
- Relatives: Edward Bernays (grandfather); Doris E. Fleischman (grandmother)
- Website: hesterkaplan.com

Hester Margaret Kaplan Stein is an American short story writer, and novelist.

== Early life and education ==
Kaplan was born to a Jewish family, the daughter of novelist Anne (née Bernays) and author Justin Kaplan. Her maternal grandparents were Doris Fleischman and Edward Bernays, "the father of public relations" and nephew of Sigmund Freud. She grew up in Cambridge and graduated from Barnard College.

== Writing and teaching career ==
Her work appeared in Ploughshares, Story, Glimmer Train, and Agni, "The Private Life of Skin", appeared in Southwest Review.

She has taught writing at Rhode Island School of Design, the Knight Science Journalism Program at MIT, the Newport MFA Program, and currently teaches at Lesley University.

Her book Twice Born: Finding My Father In the Margins of Biography was longlisted for the 2025 National Book Critics Circle Award for Autobiography.

== Personal life ==
In 1987, she married Dr. Michael Stein.

== Awards ==
- 1999 Flannery O'Connor Award for Short Fiction
- Rhode Island State Council on the Arts Fellowship
- 2008 National Endowment for the Arts Fellowship
- 2020 National Endowment for the Arts Fellowship

== Works ==
- The Edge of Marriage. W. W. Norton & Company. 2001. ISBN 978-0-393-32144-9.
- Kinship Theory: A Novel. Back Bay. 2002. ISBN 978-0-316-50426-3.
- The Tell. Harper Perennial. 2013. ISBN 978-0-06-218403-0.
- Unravished. Ig Publishing. 2014. ISBN 978-1-935439-90-5.
- Twice Born: Finding My Father In the Margins of Biography. Catapult. 2025. ISBN 978-1646223091.

=== Anthologies ===
- Garrison Keillor, ed. (1998). "Wouldn't You Know It Wasn't Love". The Best American Short Stories 1998. Houghton Mifflin. pp. 269–282. ISBN 978-0-395-87514-8.
- Amy Tan, ed. (1999). "Live Life King-Sized". The Best American Short Stories 1999. Houghton Mifflin. pp. 189–215. ISBN 978-0-395-92684-0.

=== Work appearing in Ploughshares ===
- "Goodwell", Ploughshares, Spring 1989
- "Companion Animal", Ploughshares, Spring 2003
