= Justin Kaplan =

American writer and editor (1925–2014)

- Born: Justin Daniel Kaplan; September 5, 1925; Manhattan, New York City, U.S.
- Died: March 2, 2014 (aged 88); Cambridge, Massachusetts, U.S.
- Education: Harvard University (BA)
- Occupations: Biographer, Editor
- Spouse: Anne Bernays (m. 1954)
- Children: 3
- Writing career
- Genre: Non-fiction

Justin Daniel Kaplan (September 5, 1925 – March 2, 2014) was an American writer and editor. The general editor of Bartlett's Familiar Quotations (16th and 17th eds.), he was best known as a biographer, particularly of Samuel Clemens, Lincoln Steffens, and Walt Whitman. He won the National Book Award in Arts and Letters and the 1967 Pulitzer Prize for Biography or Autobiography for Mr. Clemens and Mark Twain.

== Life ==
Kaplan was born to an Orthodox Jewish family in Manhattan, the son of Tobias D. Kaplan, a successful shirt manufacturer in New York City, and Anna (Rudman) Kaplan, a homemaker. Both of his parents died by the time he was nine. "I spent a lot of time as a boy playing in Central Park and walking around Manhattan by myself," he recalled in a 1981 Boston Globe interview. He was raised by an older brother and the family's West Indian housekeeper, who taught him to cook, which later came in handy when his wife Anne Bernays turned out to be a self-described "domestic illiterate".

A top student, Kaplan entered Harvard University at age 16, receiving a Bachelor's in English in 1944. After pursuing a post-graduate degree in English for two years, he grew dissatisfied with graduate school and moved to New Mexico. "The openness and the beauty of the Southwest," he said in the 1981 interview, "made me aware of American writers in a way I had never considered before."

He then began to work as an editor for the publishing house Simon & Schuster, where after eight years he rose to senior editor, becoming known as "the house brain", handling brainier authors including British philosopher Bertrand Russell, "Zorba the Greek" author Nikos Kazantzakis, and sociologist C. Wright Mills. Fascinated by words and language, by his early 20s Kaplan had edited translations of Plato and Aristotle. In his memoir Back Then (2002) Kaplan wrote: "It was fun to work at Simon & Schuster. [It was] not surprising to see editors staying long after hours to talk books, trade industry gossip, and joke over office bottles of Scotch and gin. In the days before it was absorbed into a conglomerate, the house was like a summer camp for intellectually hyperactive children", only without a curfew, reminiscing about dancing at a party with Marilyn Monroe, "gently kneading the little tire of baby fat around her waist."

In 1953, while an editor at art book publisher Harry Abrams, he met Anne Bernays (b. 1930), daughter of public relations pioneer Edward L. Bernays and writer Doris E. Fleischman, and great-niece of Sigmund Freud. They married in 1954. Soon after he was invited by M. Lincoln "Max" Schuster, co-founder of Simon & Schuster to help acquire "better books", seek out younger authors, and "deal diplomatically" with established names.

In 1959, Kaplan saw Hal Holbrook's celebrated stage performance of Mark Twain, causing him to become fascinated with Twain, reading everything he could by and about him then writing a 10-page proposal complete with his own contract, which was accepted by Simon & Schuster complete with a $4,000 advance, causing him to leave publishing for writing, despite the anxiety caused by leaving a well-paying job for the uncertainty of a writer's life. Needing distance from the "adrenaline-intoxicated style" of New York, and needing access to Harvard's Widener Library, he and Anne moved to Massachusetts, where he remained for the rest of his life, living in Cambridge, Massachusetts in a 16-room house on Francis Avenue, where "Anne and Joe" became the center of a literary social circle at the heart of 02138, the Harvard Square ZIP code, with neighbors including French chef Julia Child and Harvard economist John Kenneth Galbraith. Said novelist James Carroll: "If there's a writer's community in Boston, they established it. There was a period of about 15 years when their house was the center of the writing life in Boston. Joe was the pillar, and Anne was the flame. Between the two of them they made a big difference in the life of the city."

In 1973, they built a home in Truro, Massachusetts in the Outer Cape.

== Mr. Clemens and Mark Twain ==
Kaplan's first book Mr. Clemens and Mark Twain (1966) was a critical success, winning both the National Book Award in category Arts and Letters and the 1967 Pulitzer Prize for Biography or Autobiography. A stylish account of the Missouri-born humorist who attempted imperfectly to fit in with the Eastern elite, it was immediately praised as a landmark in Twain scholarship, making fans of E.L. Doctorow, Tom Wolfe et al. and becoming a standard biography. It “employed an organizing device, unusual for its day, to which Mr. Kaplan would return. Instead of arranging his subject’s life chronologically, he portrayed it out of sequence, opening the book with Twain at 31.”

Kaplan brought out the psychic split in Clemens' personality implied by the name Mark Twain, a Missouri-raised Westerner who enjoyed all the Eastern comforts of the Gilded Age. "He was bound to be tormented by the distinction and the split, always invidious, between performing humorist and man of letters, and he had no way of reconciling the two... S.L. Clemens of Hartford dreaded to meet the obligations of Mark Twain, the traveling lecturer." "To the end he remained as much an enigma and prodigy to himself as he was to the thousands at the Brick Presbyterian Church in New York who filed past the casket, topped with a single wreath of laurel, where he lay in a white suit." (last line)

Thomas Lask wrote that "Not in years has there been a biography in which the complexities of human character have been exposed with such perceptiveness, with such a grasp of their contradictory nature, with such ability to keep each strand clear and yet make it contribute to the overall fabric."

In 1974, Kaplan published Mark Twain and His World, a pictorial biography.

== Other Biographies ==
Kaplan followed Mr. Clemens and Mark Twain with two more well-received biographies, Lincoln Steffens: A Biography (1974) and Walt Whitman: A Life (1980), which won a National Book Award in category Autobiography/Biography. (Note: Walt Whitman won the 1981 award for hardcover "Autobiography/Biography". From 1980 to 1983, in National Book Award history there were dual hardcover and paperback awards in most categories, and several nonfiction subcategories including General Nonfiction. Most of the paperback award-winners were reprints, including the 1982 Autobiography/Biography.)

In 2006, Kaplan published When the Astors Owned New York: Blue Bloods and Grand Hotels in a Gilded Age, about the Astor family and the Gilded Age. He also edited several anthologies.

== Bartlett's Familiar Quotations ==
In 1988, after planned biographies of Civil War General Ulysses S. Grant and acting legend Charlie Chaplin fell through, Kaplan took a job as general editor of Bartlett's Familiar Quotations to update the 15th (1980) edition, “a job akin to running the admissions committee of the most selective college in the world" (New York Times), which he was ideally suited for, editing the 16th and 17th editions (1992, 2002). “It’s every writer’s dream,” he said in a 1990 Boston Globe interview. “Every day, I look over my shoulder because I have the sense people think I’m goofing off.” No goof-off, Kaplan began reading through all 25,000 quotations, weeding out some 3,500 obscure or unmemorable quotations from forgotten 19th century poets et al. and replacing them with more recent quotations from Elvis Presley, Norman Mailer, Noam Chomsky (“Colorless green ideas sleep furiously”) Erich Segal (“Love means never having to say you're sorry”), musicians including James Brown, Jimi Hendrix, and Michael Jackson, feminists including Susan Brownmiller (“Man’s discovery that his genitalia could serve as a weapon to generate fear must rank as one of the most important discoveries of prehistoric times, along with the use of fire and the first crude stone axe”), Erica Jong, and Germaine Greer (“Is it too much to ask that women be spared the daily struggle for superhuman beauty in order to offer it to the caresses of a subhumanly ugly mate?”), leftists including Philip Caputo (“You’re going to learn that one of the most brutal things in the world is your average nineteen-year-old American boy”) and Toni Morrison (“At no point in my life have I ever felt as though I were American”), novelists including Milan Kundera, Chinua Achebe, and Anthony Burgess, entertainment figures including Garrison Keillor, Mel Brooks, Monty Python's Flying Circus, Sesame Street (“Me want a cookie”), and Woody Allen (Sex - “It’s the most fun I’ve ever had without laughing”), and films including E.T. the Extra-Terrestrial (“ET phone home”), and Apocalypse Now (“I love the smell of napalm in the morning. It smells like victory.”).

The 1992 16th edition deleted 245 authors and added 340 new ones, along with 1,600 new quotations. The back cover lists 10 quotations selected from the more than 20,000 found inside, by Gloria Steinem, Steve Biko, Grace Slick, and fans of Star Trek. One contemporary critique argued that it neglected conservative voices and many parts "read like the liberal Left's Hall of Fame”.

“You can’t do it systematically. You do it associatively. One thing reminds you of another thing. You have to see whether it is not only quotable, but whether it has been quoted. I’m not doing an anthology of literary gems but trying to find out what people have been quoting, what is stuck in their minds.”

Kaplan was criticized for discounting the eloquence of President Ronald Reagan, whom he purposely kept out of the 1992 edition, later admitting "I'm not going to disguise the fact that I despise Ronald Reagan", and "[He] could not be described as a memorable phrase maker" but was really only "an actor masquerading as a leader". Bowing to the critics, he included in the 2002 edition Reagan's memorable 1987 demand during a speech at the Brandenburg Gate near the Berlin Wall: “Tear down this wall!”

== Memoirs ==
Joe and Anne wrote a double memoir The Language of Names (1997), and Back Then: Two Lives in 1950s New York (2002), in which they referred to themselves as "children of privilege" who went to progressive schools and were "grounded in a classical approach to education — a lot of memorizing and Shakespeare, an exhaustive approach to history, literature, and the sciences."

== Death ==
Kaplan died at the age of 88 on March 2, 2014. He had been suffering for years from Parkinson's disease. He left a wife and three daughters, Susanna Kaplan Donahue, Hester Margaret Kaplan Stein, and Polly Anne Kaplan, and six grandchildren.

He belonged to the Massachusetts Historical Society, the American Academy of Arts and Sciences, and the American Academy of Arts and Letters. Close friends included biographer Larry Tye.

In 2000, he received the Golden Plate Award of the American Academy of Achievement.

In 2002, he was interviewed by National Public Radio's Fresh Air, explaining his thought process at Bartlett's.

== Bibliography ==
- Literary Genius: 25 Classic Writers Who Define English & American Literature (2007) (Illustrated by Barry Moser)
