= The Engineering of Consent =

Essay and book by Edward Bernays

- Author: Edward Bernays
- Language: English
- Publication date: 1955
- Publication place: United States

"The Engineering of Consent" is an essay by Edward Bernays first published in 1947, and a book he published in 1955.

== Overview ==
In his own words, Bernays describes engineering consent as "use of an engineering approach—that is, action based only on thorough knowledge of the situation and on the application of scientific principles and tried practices to the task of getting people to support ideas and programs."

Bernays explained, "Professionally, [public relations] activities are planned and executed by trained practitioners in accordance with scientific principles, based on the findings of social scientists. Their dispassionate approach and methods may be likened to those of the engineering professions which stem from the physical sciences."

The threat of engineered consent in democracy has been expressed in a textbook on American government:

Under modern conditions of political advertising and manipulation, it has become possible to talk of the engineering of consent by an elite of experts and professional politicians. Consent that is thus engineered is difficult to distinguish in any fundamental way from the consent that supports modern totalitarian governments. Were the manipulated voter to become the normal voter, the government he supports could hardly be said to rest on his consent in any traditional sense of that word.

To some observers, consumer psychologists have already made the choice for people before they buy a certain product. Marketing is often based on themes and symbols that unconsciously influence consumer behavior.

== Essay ==
The essay first appeared in the Annals of the American Academy of Political and Social Science. The author's observations in the essay include the following:

- The United States has become a small room where a single whisper is magnified thousands of times.
- There are two divisions in media: commercial and organized group information systems.
- Today's leaders have become more remote physically from the public, yet, at the same time, the public has much greater familiarity with these leaders through the system of modern communications...Increased influence of mass media is due to widespread and enormously rapid diffusion of literacy.
- With the aid of technicians in the field who have specialized in utilizing the channels of communications, [some leaders] have been able to achieve purposefully and scientifically what we have termed "the engineering of consent".
- The freedoms of press, speech, petition and assembly, the freedoms which make the engineering of consent possible, are among the most cherished guarantees in the Constitution of the United States.
- Under no circumstances should the engineering of consent supersede or displace the educational system, either formal or informal, in bringing about understanding by the people as the basis for their actions. The engineering of consent often does supplement the educational process.
- The chief function [of the profession] is to analyze objectively and realistically the position of its client vis-a-vis a public, and to advise as to the necessary corrections in its client's attitudes towards and approaches to that public.
- It must be remembered of course that good will, the basis of lasting adjustment, can be preserved in the long run, only by those whose actions warrant it... The public relations counsel has the professional responsibility to push only those ideas that he can respect, and not to promote causes or accept assignments for clients he considers anti-social.
- As in physical engineering, a feasibility study must be done and a budget drawn up.
- The engineer of consent must be powerfully equipped with facts, with truths, with evidence before he shows himself before a public.
- Bernays recommends World Almanac with lists of thousands of associations across the United States – a cross-section of the country.
- The public's attitudes, ideas, presumptions or prejudices result from definite influences. One must try to find out what they are in any situation in which one is working.
- Democratic society is actually only a loose aggregate of constituent groups...To influence the public, the engineer of consent works with and through group leaders and opinion moulders on every level.
- Research furnishes the equivalent of the mariner's chart, the architect's blue print, the traveler's road map.
- Themes must appeal to the motives of the public. Motives are the activation of both conscious and subconscious pressure created by the force of desires
- Organization also correlates the activities of any specialists who may be called upon from time to time, such as opinion researchers, fund raisers, publicity men, radio and motion picture experts, specialists for women's clubs or foreign language groups, and the like.
- Set in motion a broad activity, the success of which depends on interlocking all phases and elements of the proposed strategy, implemented by tactics that are timed to the moment of maximum effectiveness.
- The developing of events and circumstances that are not routine is one of the basic functions of the engineer of consent.

== Book ==
The Engineering of Consent
- Author: Edward Bernays
- Language: English
- Publisher: University of Oklahoma Press
- Publication date: 1955
- Publication place: United States

In 1955 University of Oklahoma Press published Bernays' book The Engineering of Consent. In fact Bernays contributed only the first chapter (22 pages) "The Theory and Practice of Public Relations: A Resumé". The seven other chapters were by his associates: "Objectives" by Howard Walden Cutler, "Research" by Sherwood Dodge, "Strategy" by Nicholas Samstag, "Themes and Symbols" by Doris Fleischman and H.W. Cutler, "Organization for public relations" by John Price Jones, "Planning" by Benjamin Fine, and "The tactics of public relations" by A. Robert Ginsburgh.

The longest chapter, the one on strategy, begins with sociological and psychological observations on human motivation drawn from Karl Menninger and Vilfredo Pareto. Samstag illustrates varieties of strategy with sample cases before the public. He details aspects of timing, forbearance, approach, surprise, participation, association, disassociation, crossroads, personalization, bland withdrawal, apparent withdrawal, apparent runner-up, omission, reversal, mosaic, and understatement.

=== Reviews ===
A. Edgar Schuler called the book a "convenient and compact introduction to the field of public relations." He singles out Samstag's chapter as "interesting, enlightening, provocative, and poignant."

M. Weisglas reviewed the book for International Communication Gazette, writing that "Bernays and company have deluded their readers with false hopes about public relations."

== Women’s smoking ==
In a practical example of Edward Bernays’ theory detailed in his essay, George Washington Hill, president of the American Tobacco Company, hired Edward Bernays in 1928 to lead a campaign to entice more women to smoke in public. The campaign is believed to have helped to convert attitudes towards women's smoking from a social taboo to a more socially acceptable act. Bernays did this by associating women's smoking with the ideas of "power" and "freedom" which he did by using the slogan Torches of Freedom during a famous parade in New York City.

The idea of “Engineering of Consent” was motivated by Freud’s idea that humans are irrational beings, and are motivated primarily by inner desires hidden in their unconscious. If one understood what those unconscious desires were, then one could use this to one’s advantage to sell products and increase sales.

== Influence ==
The Engineering of Consent also applies to the pioneered application of Freudian psychoanalytic concepts and techniques to business—in particular to the study of consumer behavior in the marketplace. Ideas established strongly influenced the practices of the advertising industry in the twentieth century.

The techniques applied developing the "consumer lifestyle" were also later applied to developing theories in cultural commodification; which has proven successful in the later 20th century (with diffusion of cultures throughout North America) to sell ethnic foods and style in popular mainstream culture by removing them from geography and ethnic histories and sanitizing them for a general public.

Ernest Dichter applied what he dubbed "the strategy of desire" for building a "stable society," by creating for the public a common identity through the products they consumed; again, much like with cultural commodification, where culture has no "identity," "meaning," or "history" inherited from previous generations, but rather, is created by the attitudes which are introduced by consumer behaviors and social patterns of the period. According to Dichter, "To understand a stable citizen, you have to know that modern man quite often tries to work off his frustrations by spending on self-sought gratification. Modern man is internally ready to fulfill his self-image, by purchasing products which complement it."

== See also ==
- Subliminal message
- The Century of the Self
- Manufacturing Consent
- Nudge theory
- Choice architecture
