= Crystallizing Public Opinion =

1923 book by Edward Bernays

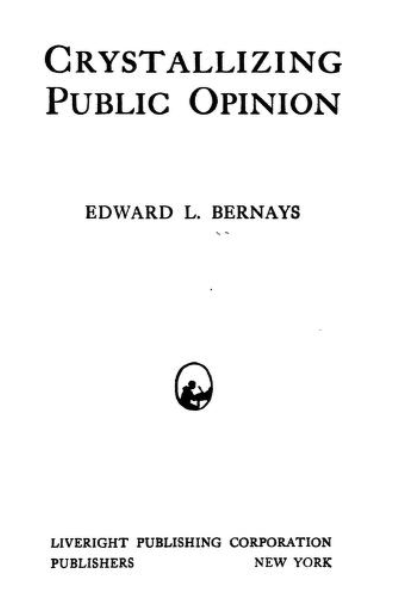
- Title page for Crystallizing Public Opinion (1923)
- Author: Edward Bernays
- Publication date: 1923

Crystallizing Public Opinion is a book written by Edward Bernays and published in 1923. It is perhaps the first book to define and explain the field of public relations.

Bernays defines the counsel on public relations, as, more than a press agent, someone who can create a useful symbolic linkage among the masses. Appropriate messages should be crafted based on careful study of group psychology, and disseminated by not merely purveying but actually creating news.

He gives examples from his early career and cites ideas from theorists including Walter Lippmann and Wilfred Trotter.

== Synopsis ==
=== Part I—Scope and Functions ===
Bernays describes how he solved various problems as a public relations counsel. These include:

- Helping a hotel to defeat a rumor it was closing, by publicly renewing the contract of the famous and well-paid maître d'hôtel. (pp. 14–16)
- Selling bacon by asking a physician to conduct a survey confirming the dietary soundness of eating bacon for breakfast. (pp. 16–17)
- Resolving a labor shortage in the Kansas wheat harvest by promoting the job, through the War Department and the Associated Press, to soldiers returning from World War I. Appealing to business men to hire soldiers in general. (pp. 21–24)
- Promoting Lithuanian national identity by forming a Lithuanian National Council, disseminating information of interest respectively to intellectuals, politicians, sports fans, and other demographically profiled groups. Thus: "He reflected to those communities whose crystallized opinion would be helpful in guiding other opinions, facts which gave them the basis for conclusions favorable to Lithuania." (pp. 24–27)
- Bolstering the League of Nations by forming a diverse committee to advocate for it. "The public relations consultant, having assisted in the formation of this committee, called a meeting of women representing Democratic, Republican, radical, reactionary, club, society, professional and industrial groups, and suggested that they make a united appeal for national support of the League of Nations." (pp. 31–32)

Public opinion, he writes, is becoming more and more a matter of interest, as people seek out information about the world, and as various organizations attempt to create favorable impressions. Especially interested in public opinion are those companies—the public utilities—which especially are supposed to serve the public. (pp. 41–46)

The public relations counsel is a student of psychology, but also "a practitioner with a wide range of instruments": the circumstances he creates, followed by advertising, movies, letters, booklets, parades, articles, etc. (pp. 52–54)

=== Part II—The Group and Herd ===
"Public opinion", according to Bernays, is an amorphous group of judgments which are not well elaborated even in the head of a single average individual. He extracts a quotation by Wilfred Trotter, which states that this average man has many strong convictions whose origin he can't explain (Instincts of the Herd in Peace and War, p. 36). People's minds have "logic-proof compartments" which must be approached by means beyond the rational. (pp. 61–68)

After discussing the mutual influence between the press and the public, suggesting that the public relations counsel should understand the established public opinion in its complexity. He invokes the concept of "stereotype" described by Walter Lippmann, noting that the stereotypes people already hold govern what new facts they will absorb. He cites Everett Dean Martin's 1920 book The Behavior of Crowds, discussing how herd mentality can exaggerate people's unconscious urges, lower inhibitions, and heighten antagonism to other groups. Educated people can display this mentality just as the ignorant can. Bernays quotes Trotter stating that herd mentality affects people all the time, not only when they are part of an actual mob in the street. (pp. 98–110)

The public relations practitioner, therefore, must tap into the current of group energy. (pp. 118–122)

=== Part III—Technique and Method ===
Modern America's size and heterogeneity "make it necessary to-day for the proponent of a point of view to engage an expert to represent him before society, an expert who must know how to reach groups totally dissimilar as to ideals, customs, and even language. It is this necessity which has resulted in the development of the counsel on public relations." The skilled public relations man provides a valuable service in overcoming heterogeneity to influence millions of people in the same way. This is done by using established communication media to communicate the right facts at the right time. (pp. 125–138)

People should be targeted as members of "interlapping groups" which involve different aspects of their identity. (139–146) For example, in promoting silk: silk was represented as fashionable to women's clubs, artistic to art-lovers, and historically interesting to schools. These different angles could appeal to different aspects of people's identity:

The school teacher was appealed to in the schoolroom as an educator, and after school hours as a member of a women's club. She read the advertisements about silk as a woman reader of the newspapers, and as a member of the women's group which visited the museums, she saw the silk there. The woman who stayed at home was brought into contact with the silk through her child. (p. 146)

Highlighting the correct group identity for the purpose at hand is much more effective than trying to change the stance of an individual group. Emphasizing changing external conditions, such as new technology, is also effective. Universal instincts such as self-preservation and sex can also be usefully invoked. Or, instinct-emotion pairs like flight-fear, revulsion-disgust, pugnacity-anger, and others. (pp. 146–153)

"The public relations counsel sometimes uses the current stereotypes, sometimes combats them, and sometimes creates new ones." (p. 162)

As the methods of psychological influence are many and various, Bernays proposes to focus on fundamentals. He encourages the public relations counsel to imagine himself in turn as a member of the different groups he must reach, and thereafter construct a campaign which will appeal to as many as possible. For example, a hotel wishing to demonstrate its prominence can hold a public celebration with carefully chosen guests —(including "a leading banker, a society woman, a prominent lawyer, an influential preacher, and so forth until a cross section of the city's most telling activities is mirrored in the committee." (166–169).

The public relations counsel must therefore generate news, "no matter what the medium which broadcasts this news."

The public relations counsel must lift startling facts from his whole subject and present them as news. He must isolate ideas and develop them into events so that they can be more readily understood and so that they may claim attention as news.

Once interesting news is created it will propagate itself through media channels which already seek to capture public attention. (p. 171)

=== Part IV—Ethical Relations ===
Bernays continues his discussion of news and observes that journalists see public relations practitioners as important sources of newsworthy information. He stresses the centrality of newspapers to culture and writes that the public relations counselor must supply "truthful, accurate, and verifiable news" to remain in the journalists' good graces. (p. 177–183)

The definition of "news" is not settled and varies from newspaper to newspaper. Bernays quotes William Henry Irwin's definition that news is "a departure from the established order". Then, he quotes Irwin's list of principles for newsworthiness, which he points out may somewhat contradict the definition:

1. "We prefer to read about the things we like." ("Power for the men, affections for the women.")
2. "Our interest in news increases in direct ratio to our familiarity with its subject, its setting, and its dramatis personæ."
3. "Our interest in news increases in direct ratio to the general importance of the persons or activities which it affects."

Often, Bernays quotes Lippmann, an "overt act" is necessary to clarify a state of affairs so that it can become news. Lippmann wrote that a press agent stands between the event and the press in order to control the flow of information. Bernays writes that a counsel on public relations does not merely purvey news but create it. The resulting material must of course be truthful and accurate—and furthermore it must be well-written and dispensed with sensitivity to the needs of the various media through which it will be broadcast. (pp. 191–198)

Beyond the newspaper, there is radio, lecture tours, meetings, advertising (including billboards and any other type of paid space), plays, cinema, and direct mail. (pp. 199–207)

Defending the role of the public relations counsel as a "special pleader", Bernays writes that the viewpoints which he fosters are not necessarily worse than those he would discourage. In reality, "the only difference between 'propaganda' and 'education,' really, is in the point of view. The advocacy of what we believe in is education. The advocacy of what we don't believe in is propaganda." He quotes Elmer Davis's observation that "the relativity of truth is a commonplace to any newspaper man, even to one who has never studied epistemology." (pp. 208–213)

"The social value of the public relations counsel lies in the fact that he brings to the public facts and ideas of social utility which would not so readily gain acceptance otherwise." (p. 216)

Bernays concludes with a quotation from Ferdinand Tönnies which warns that civilization is under threat from lower instincts and that the "higher strata of society" must "inject moral and spiritual motives into public opinion." (p. 217)

== Response ==
Commentators acknowledged that Bernays was mapping out new territory with his book, which claimed to define the "counsel on public relations" for the first time. The New York Times called it "the first book to be devoted exclusively to the occupation which is gradually becoming of overwhelming national importance." Opinions of its merit varied. H. L. Mencken called it a "pioneer book" at the time but later disparaged it. Future senator Ernest Gruening, in a review called "Higher Hokum", asked whether persuading the public was much preferable to corralling them by heavier-handed means (the "public be damned" approach)—whether the end result would "be greatly different for the public which, while it no longer tolerates being 'damned,' guilelessly permits itself to be 'bunked'? Is seduction preferable to ravishment?"

== Critical analysis ==
Crystallizing Public Opinion appeared the year after Lippmann's Public Opinion and can be construed as an application of Lippman's principles to the active manipulation of public opinion. Whereas Lippmann saw a bigger role for government in steering public opinion, Bernays focused on the corporation and its public relations attaché.

Professor Sue Curry Jansen argues that Bernays distorted Lippman's work (and that public relations historians such as Stuart Ewen and Larry Tye have uncritically recapitulated Bernays on this point). She writes that Public Opinion is an analysis of the constraints on rationality which confront a democratic society and that "Bernays systematically inverts Lippmann’s critique into an apology for public relations by selectively and deceptively quoting him in support of positions that Lippmann clearly rejects." Whereas Lippmann treated the stereotype as a sort of blind spot, or obstacle to rational thinking, Bernays viewed it as "a great aid to the public relations counsel" despite being "not necessarily truthful". She also finds that Crystallizing Public Opinion sometimes attributes quotations to Lippmann which do not match the text of Public Opinion at all.

== See also ==
- Reality-based community
