= Q. D. Leavis =

English literary critic (1906–1981)

Q. D. Leavis

Queenie Dorothy Leavis (née Roth, 7 December 1906 – 17 March 1981) was an English literary critic and essayist.

== Life ==
Queenie Leavis was born in Edmonton, London, to Morris Roth (1876–1953), hosier, and afterwards draper, and Jane Davis (1876–1940). She came from a Jewish family and her marriage to her Gentile husband F. R. Leavis caused a permanent rift with her relatives.

Leavis attended Latymer School, Edmonton, and in 1925 won a scholarship to study English at Girton College, Cambridge. She graduated in 1928 with a first-class degree with distinction in the English tripos. Her PhD thesis, carried out under the supervision of I. A. Richards, became the book Fiction and the Reading Public (1932). Fiction and the Reading Public was influenced by Robert and Helen Lynd's book Middletown, the work of the anthropologist A. C. Haddon, and Instincts of the Herd in Peace and War by Wilfred Trotter. It sought to account for what Leavis regarded as the cultural decline of literary standards by surveying the marketing of modern fiction. Leavis regarded modern literature as largely inferior to "unitary" literature of the 16th and 17th centuries. She wrote about the historical sociology of reading and the development of the English, the European, and the American novel. She paid particular attention to the writings of Jane Austen, George Eliot, Herman Melville, the Brontës, Edith Wharton and Charles Dickens.

Leavis was noted for scrupulous detail in her research, but also for being sometimes irrationally pertinacious in the maintenance of her opinions. An example was the experience of her one-time pupil Valerie Grosvenor Myer, who entered the University of Cambridge as a mature student and was taught by Leavis in her final year. In a supervision on Hardy's Jude the Obscure, as Leavis held forth on the virtues of the organic community (an article of faith among the Scrutiny set), her student Grosvenor Myer, who had been brought up in a remote part of the Forest of Dean, commented that such communities could have their drawbacks. "I grew up till the age of 19 in a house without electricity or indoor sanitation," she pointed out. "Nonsense, dear," rejoined Leavis in not-to-be-contradicted tones; "you're much too young!"

Leavis was unsympathetic to the feminist movement, and attacked Virginia Woolf's feminist polemic Three Guineas.

Much of her work was published collaboratively with her husband, F. R. Leavis. She contributed to and supported as an editor Scrutiny (1932–1951), an influential journal that sought to promote a stringent and morally serious approach to literary criticism.

Author and actor Stephen Fry reported that she had the reputation of being a harridan.

The mathematician Leonard Roth was her brother.

== Works ==
- Fiction and the Reading Public (1932)
- Lectures in America (1969, with F. R. Leavis)
- Dickens, the Novelist (1970, with F. R. Leavis)
- Collected Essays, Volume 1: The Englishness of the English Novel (1983)
- Collected Essays, Volume 2: The American Novel and Reflections on the European Novel (1985)
- Collected Essays, Volume 3: The Novel of Religious Controversy, (1989)
