= Nicholas Samstag =

Nicholas Samstag (1904–1968) was an American writer who composed poetry and advertisements. He worked as promotions director of Time magazine from 1943 through 1960.

Nicholas attended DeWitt Clinton High School in New York City. In 1928 and 29 he had several poems published in The New Yorker magazine. In 1952 he wrote a children's book Kay Kay Comes Home: a Fable of Enthusiasm in the form of a Russian folktale. The book was selected by New York Times as one of the best illustrated children's books of 1952.

In 1955 Samstag described strategies used to improve corporate public relations in the book The Engineering of Consent which was edited by Edward Bernays. Bernays defined public relations as "the attempt, by information, persuasion, and adjustment, to engineer public support for an activity, cause, movement, or institution". Samstag was a junior associate of Bernays at the time, and contributed a long chapter on "Strategy" which was noted as both enlightening and provocative. It illustrated with cases the variety of strategies in public relations. More notable was his willingness to air the controversial subject of ethics in the field. His chapter concluded,

It may be said that to take advantage of a man's credulity, to exploit his misapprehensions, to capitalize on his ignorance is morally reprehensible—and this may well be the case. [. . .] Where, then does the author of this chapter stand on these difficult and reproachful questions? I do not quite know—and I am neither contented nor arrogant in that unsatisfactory answer. But this should be said: a strategy is an instrument for winning.

Samstag closes by discussing warfare and business as synonymous, suggesting generals and bosses "must make terms with their own consciences. I cannot help them there" (p. 137).

In 1957 he wrote his own manual for promotion: Persuasion for Profit. In 1960 he was invited by the Minnesota Advertisers' Club to speak. He encouraged the advertisers to become generalists by reading widely so that they may better communicate with their markets. The speech was published by Vital Speeches of the Day.

Samstag died of cancer in Manhattan in 1968 at 64 years of age. The Time magazine article marking his death said:

A recognized, often flamboyant practitioner of his trade, Samstag wrote a number of successful books, including Bamboozled and The Uses of Ineptitude and, while running his own agency after 1960, took ads in Manhattan newspapers offering to teach anyone everything he knew about the advertising and promotion business—for a fee of $10,000. The day after Samstag's death, his fifth wife, Suzanne, 38, was found dead in her room at a Kennedy Airport hotel.

== Works ==
Samstag made several contributions to The New Yorker magazine: Poems Coq d’or (August 13, 1927), Tartuffe (September 3, 1927), Brahmin, A Juggernaut of Ivory (September 17, 1927), Trowel Couchant on a Field of Sugar (September 24, 1927), Lines, I could decry (March 24, 1928), Midnight at Grant’s Tomb (January 30, 1928), and Bad Loser, the Graybar is moody (January 1, 1929). He also contributed the fiction story Backdrop (June 2, 1928).

- 1952 Kay-Kay Comes Home: a Fable of Enthusiasm, with drawings by Ben Shahn, published by Kurt Valentin, NY
- 1957 Persuasion for Profit, reviewed by E.W. Martin (1958) in Business Horizons
- 1960 "Read and Grow Up, be more than a specialist", speech delivered January 21 to Minnesota Advertisers Club

The following book reviews were published:

- 1967: Life with the Kaufmans by Edward M. Cohen
- 1968: The Boots of the Virgin by Earl Shorris
- 1969: Prime Time by Alexander Kendrick
- 1969: Crisis of Confidence by Arthur M. Schlesinger Jr.

== Culture ==
Theodore Sturgeon's 1953 science fiction novel, More Than Human, is dedicated to Samstag:
