= Public Relations (book) =

1945 sociology book by Edward Bernays

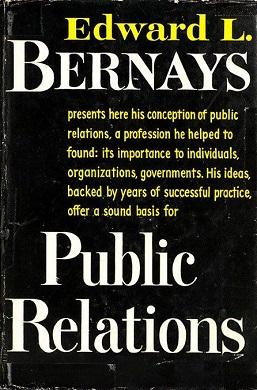
- 1952 edition
- Author: Edward Bernays
- Language: English
- Series: Vocational and Professional Monographs, no. 58
- Subject: Sociology
- Published: 1945
- Publication place: United States
- OCLC: 5458074

Public Relations is a sociology book written by American pioneer in the field of public relations and propaganda, Edward Bernays, and first published in 1945.
