= Leonard Roth =

British mathematician (1904–1968)

Leonard Roth (29 August 1904 – 28 November 1968) was a mathematician working in the Italian school of algebraic geometry. He introduced an example of a unirational variety that was not rational (though his proof that it was not rational was incomplete).

Roth was born in Edmonton, London. He was educated at Latymer Upper School, Dulwich College and Clare College, Cambridge, where he graduated as a Wrangler in 1926. He died in 1968 in Pittsburgh, Pennsylvania. His sister was Queenie Roth, literary critic and wife of F. R. Leavis.

== Publications ==
- Levy, H.; Roth, L. (1936), Elements of probability, The Clarendon press
- Roth, L. (1949), Modern elementary geometry, Modern Elementary Geometry, Thomas Nelson and Sons Ltd.
- Roth, L. (1955), Algebraic threefolds, with special regard to problems of rationality, Ergebnisse der Mathematik und ihrer Grenzgebiete (N.F.), Heft 6, Berlin, New York: Springer-Verlag, MR 0076426
- Semple, J. G.; Roth, L. (1985), Introduction to algebraic geometry, Oxford Science Publications, The Clarendon Press Oxford University Press, MR 0814690
