= J. A. Hadfield =

British psychotherapist (1882–1967)

James Arthur Hadfield (1882–1967) was a pioneer of psychodynamic psychotherapy in Britain, who became an influential figure at the interwar Tavistock Clinic.

He is perhaps best known as being the analyst of W. R. Bion, while Bion was analysing Samuel Beckett.

== Technique ==
Coming from an academic background, Hadfield was influenced in his psychological approach by both Carl Jung and William McDougall. Causally, Hadfield favoured lack of parental protection rather than the repression of sexual love as the source of childhood disturbances.

His writings were repeatedly criticised by Ernest Jones for their lack of Freudianism; while his analytic technique has been seen as a reductive attempt to uncover childhood trauma, at the expense of the use of the analytic relationship, and the exploration of transference and countertransference.

== Psychical research ==
Hadfield was also interested in psychical research. He was a believer in life after death and telepathy. He wrote the chapter "The Mind and the Brain" for the book Immortality: An Essay in Discovery Co-Ordinating Scientific, Psychical, and Biblical Research (London: Macmillan, 1917).

== Publications ==
Among his many publications were:

- Psychology and Morals (1923)
- Psychology of Power (1933)
- Psychology and Modern Problems (1935)
- Psychology and Morals: An Analysis of Character (1944)
- Dream and Nightmares (1954)
- Childhood and Adolescence (1962)

== See also ==
- War neurosis
- W. H. R. Rivers
- Wilfred Trotter
