= Propaganda (book) =

Book by Edward Bernays

- Author: Edward Bernays
- Language: English
- Publisher: Horace Liveright
- Publication date: November 1928
- Publication place: United States
- Pages: 159
- OCLC: 546935
- LC Class: HM263 .B4
- Preceded by: Verdict of Public Opinion on Propaganda
- Followed by: This Business of Propaganda

Propaganda is a book written by Edward Bernays in 1928. It incorporated the literature from social science and psychological manipulation into an examination of the techniques of public communication. Bernays wrote the book in response to the success of some of his earlier works such as Crystallizing Public Opinion (1923) and A Public Relations Counsel (1927). Propaganda explored the psychology behind manipulating masses and the ability to use symbolic action and propaganda to influence politics and effect social change. Walter Lippmann was Bernays's unacknowledged American mentor and his work The Phantom Public greatly influenced the ideas expressed in Propaganda a year later. The work propelled Bernays into media historians' view of him as the "father of public relations."

== Synopsis ==
Chapters one through six address the complex relationship between human psychology, democracy, and corporations. Bernays's thesis is that "invisible" people who create knowledge and propaganda rule over the masses, with a monopoly on the power to shape thoughts, values, and citizen response. "Engineering consent" of the masses would be vital for the survival of democracy. Bernays explained:

"The conscious and intelligent manipulation of the organized habits and opinions of the masses is an important element in democratic society. Those who manipulate this unseen mechanism of society constitute an invisible government which is the true ruling power of our country. We are governed, our minds are molded, our tastes formed, our ideas suggested, largely by men we have never heard of."

Bernays expands this argument to the economic realm, appreciating the positive impact of propaganda in the service of capitalism.

"A single factory, potentially capable of supplying a whole continent with its particular product, cannot afford to wait until the public asks for its product; it must maintain constant touch, through advertising and propaganda, with the vast public in order to assure itself the continuous demand which alone will make its costly plant profitable."

Bernays places great importance on the ability of a propaganda producer, as he views himself, to unlock the motives behind an individual's desires, not simply the reason an individual might offer. He argues, "Man's thoughts and actions are compensatory substitutes for desires which he has been obliged to suppress." Bernays suggests that propaganda may become increasingly effective and influential through the discovery of audiences' hidden motives. He asserts that the emotional response inherently present in propaganda limits the audience's choices by creating a binary mentality, which can result in quicker, more enthused responses. The final five chapters largely reiterate the concepts voiced earlier in the book and provide case studies for how to use propaganda to effectively advance women's rights, education, and social services.

== Reception ==
External videos
- Discussion of Propaganda with Anne Bernays (daughter of Edward Bernays) and NYU professor Mark Crispin Miller, September 29, 2004, C-SPAN

Despite the relative significance of Propaganda to twentieth century media history and modern public relations, surprisingly little critique of the work exists. Public relations scholar Curt Olsen argues that the public largely accepted Bernays's "sunny" view of propaganda, an acceptance eroded by fascism in the World War II era. Olsen also argues that Bernays's skill with language allowed terms such as "education" to subtly replace darker concepts such as "indoctrination." Finally, Olsen criticizes Bernays for advocating "psychic ease" for the average person to have no burden to answer for his or her own actions in the face of powerful messages. On the other hand, writers such as Marvin Olasky justify Bernays as killing democracy in order to save it. In this way, the presence of an elite, faceless persuasion constituted the only plausible way to prevent authoritarian control.

Concepts outlined in Bernays's Propaganda and other works enabled the development of the first "two-way model" of public relations, using elements of social science in order to better formulate public opinion. Bernays justified public relations as a profession by clearly emphasizing that no individual or group had a monopoly on the true understanding of the world. According to public relations expert Stuart Ewen, "What Lippmann set out in grand, overview terms, Bernays is running through in how-to-do-it-terms." His techniques are now staples for public image creation and political campaigns.
