= Instincts of the Herd in Peace and War =

1916 book by English surgeon Wilfred Trotter

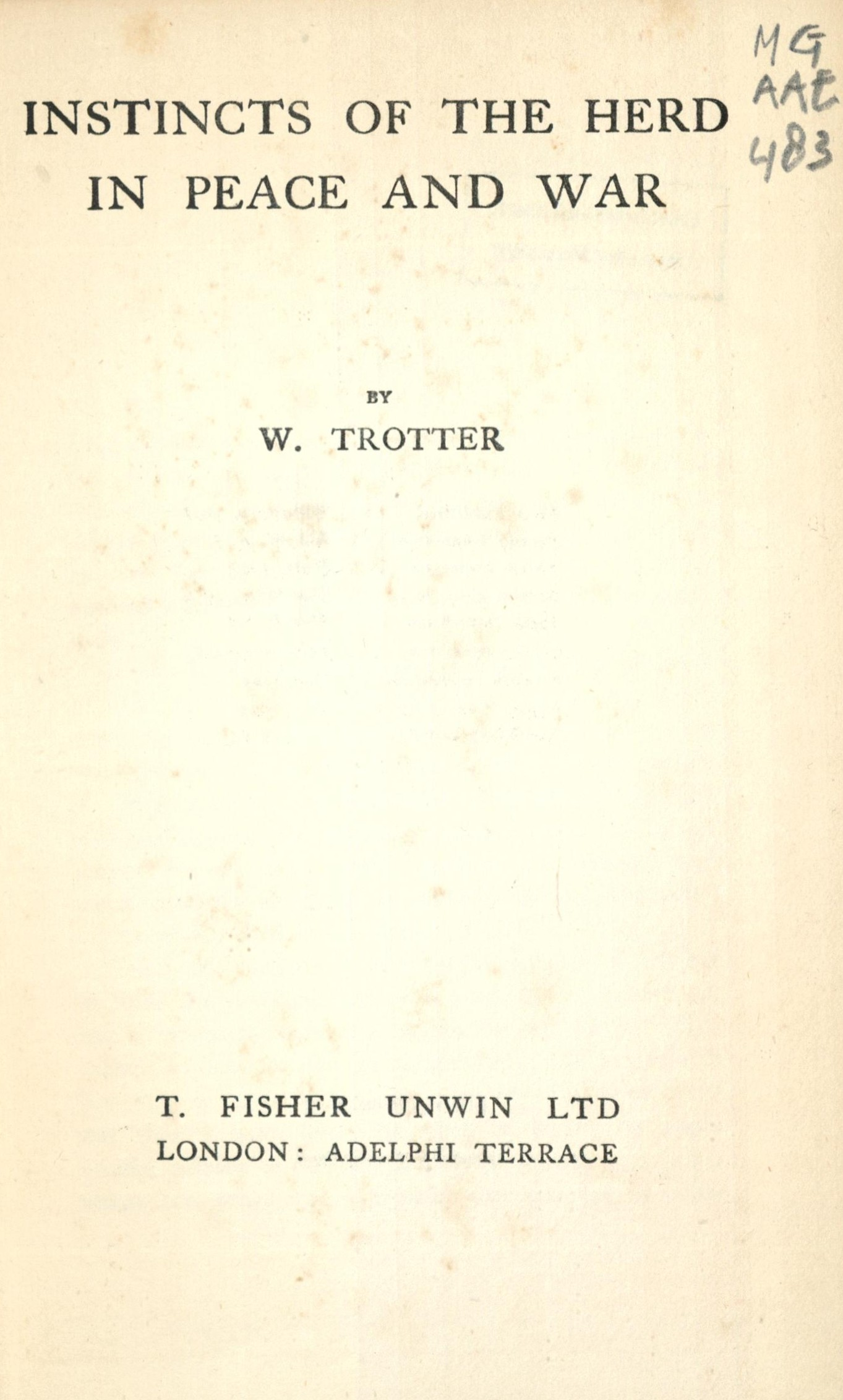
- Title page of Instincts of the Herd in Peace and War (1916)
- Author: Wilfred Trotter
- Language: English
- Genre: Non-fiction
- Publication date: 1916

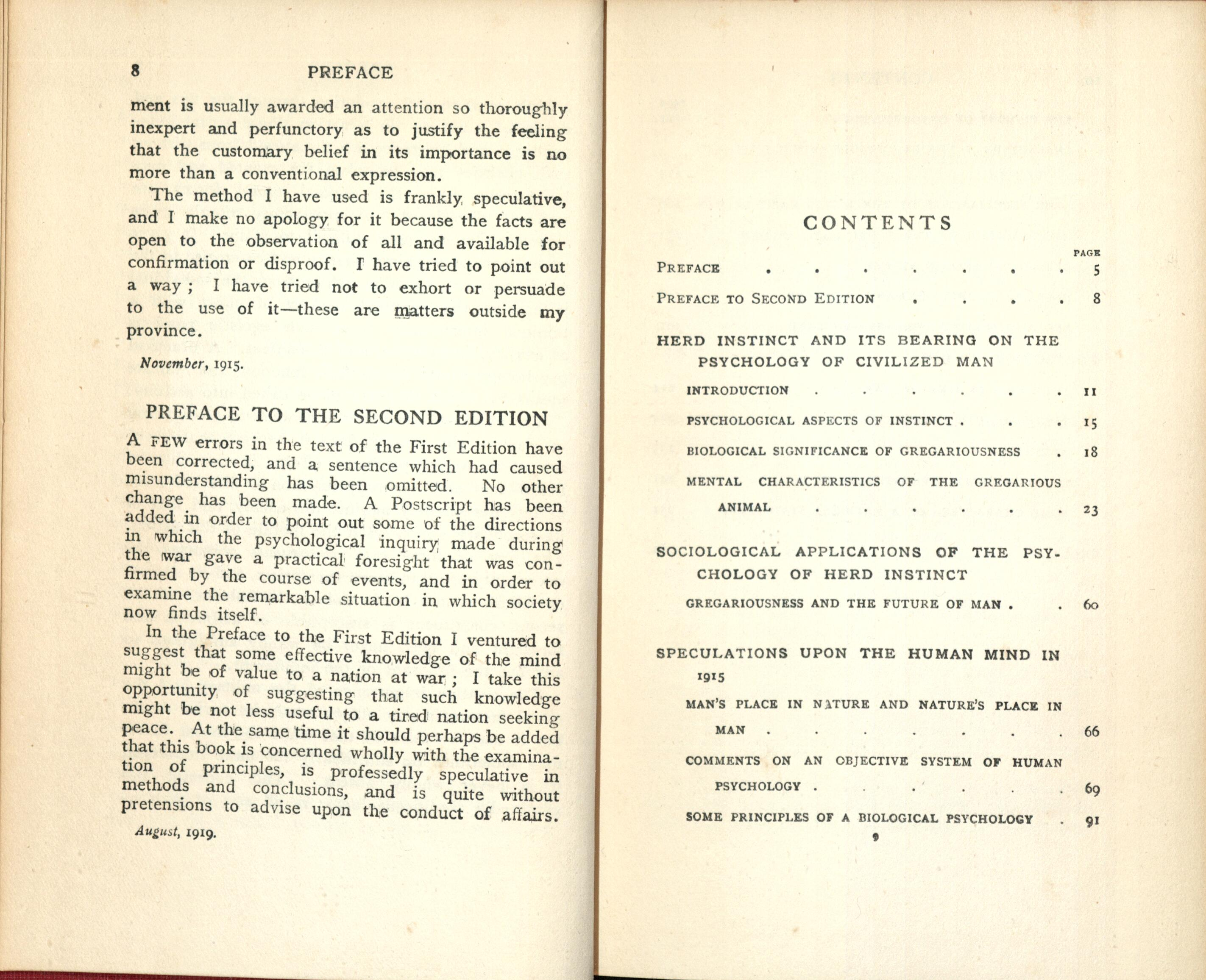
Table of contents

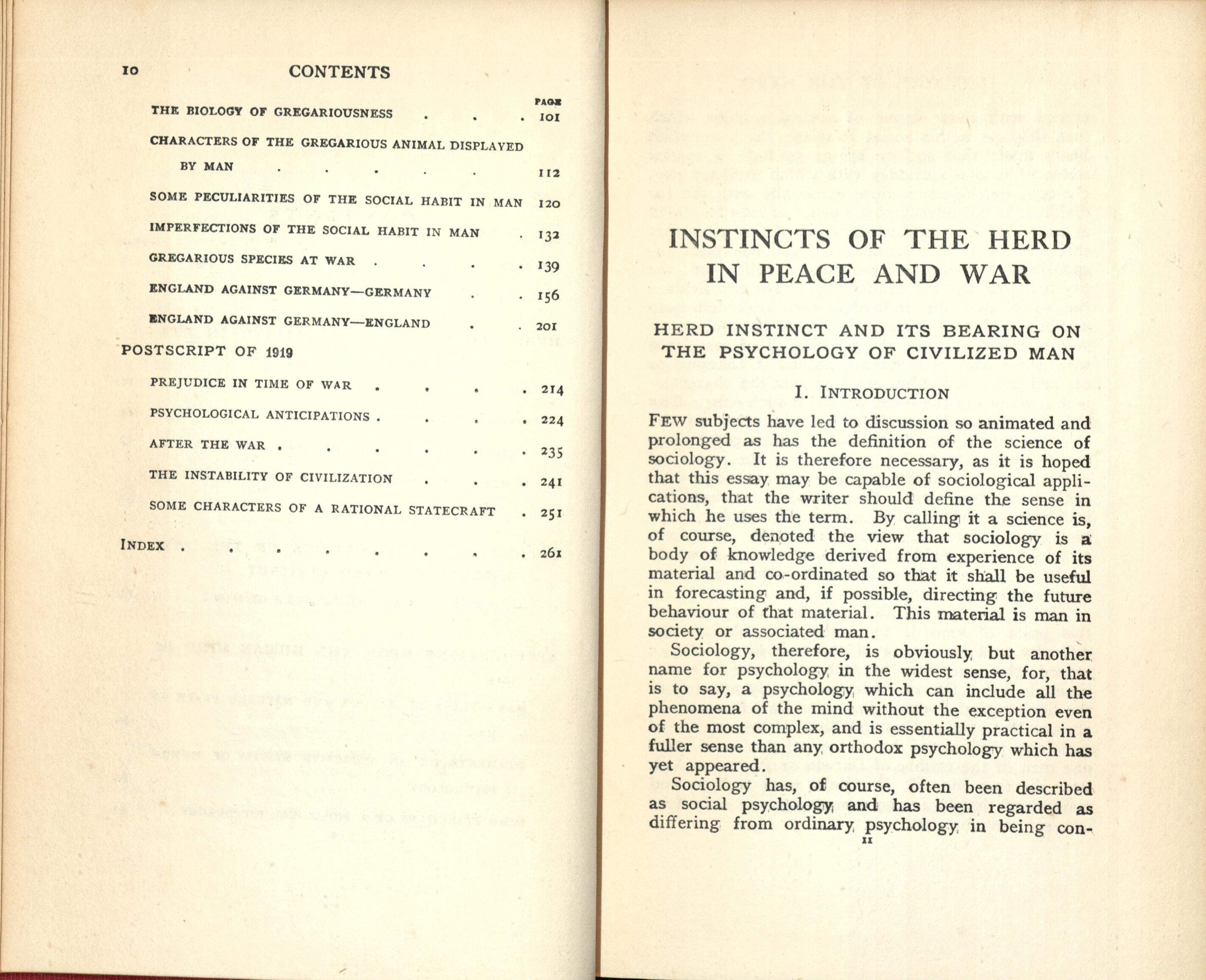

Instincts of the Herd in Peace and War is a book by English surgeon Wilfred Trotter, published in 1916. Based on the ideas of Gustave Le Bon, it was very influential in the development of group dynamics and crowd psychology, and the propaganda of Edward Bernays. It was also a key influence on Q. D. Leavis' book Fiction and the Reading Public (1932).

After its initial publication, the book was revisited by the author and published again in 1919. The 1919 edition also contained a postscript reflecting on the practical implications of the book's objectives during the First World War.

The book consists of a collection of essays which investigate the importance of human behaviour in relation to the human social environment and introducing the concept of "herd instinct". Explorations of human and collective behaviour are made within the contexts of peace and war, particularly in relation to social motivation and conformity. Due to its pioneer and theoretical background, the book became a foundational work in the field of social psychology.

== Context ==
The academic interest of studying crowd behaviour and groups emerged in the late 19th and early 20th century. Publications and research within the field were particularly prominent in response to urbanisation and the shifting political scenes of the 1900s Western world. The rise of new ideologies like nationalism and socialism, the wave of revolution in 1848 across Europe, the American Civil War, and social and political movements all contributed to the acceleration of studying social and group psychology. A seminal volume in the field of crowd psychology was written by the French polyhistor Gustave Le Bon, published in 1895. This pioneer publication focuses on the collective unconscious group mind and several characteristics of crowd behaviour, such as inherently emerging irrationality and suggestibility. In 1922, it was also used as an important inspiration for Freud's work based on his psychoanalytic approach on describing a mental mechanism behind mass movements. In the beginning of the 20th century, the French sociologist Gabriel Tarde's theories on crowd behaviour took a different approach from Le Bon's ideas, principally paying attention to group identity forming, imitation and the role of leaders in influencing crowd action. In his framework, crowd dynamics shaped the individual and society as well.

With a successful medical and neurological background as a surgeon, Wilfred Trotter entered the field of social psychology representing a biological viewpoint originating from his medical studies. Based on his knowledge about biology and his fascination with Freud's work and psychological approach, Trotter started to investigate the underlying causes of human behaviour. He observed several species living in herds, such as sheep, dogs and bees, noting aspects of their gregarious behaviour. His biological background set in Darwinism and evolutionary theory led him to the proposal that such herd-like tendencies can be applied to human behaviour as well, in the context of a social environment.

Based on his observations, he presented his first contribution to crowd psychology as an essay, titled "Herd Instinct and Its Bearing on the Psychology of Civilised Man", published in The Sociological Review in 1908, then republished in 1909. In this essay, Trotter presented his idea that human behaviour is essentially influenced by our social environment, and that animals and humans that live in groups have a motivational drive, called the "herd instinct", an instinct-like mechanism directing their behaviours. The publication was well received in the academic community, being published several times and attracting the attention of psychologists, philosophers, biologists and sociologists of the era. Inspired by the success of the essay, and with the aim of integrating his ideas of the early publication, the book Instincts of the Herd in Peace and War was written and published in 1919, containing the original essay separated into two chapters, together with the author's later work reflecting his ideas on the context of the First World War.

== Contents ==
Instincts of the Herd in Peace and War contains a collection of essays written between 1908 and 1915. In the second edition published in 1919, a postscript is added as a reflection on the book's main ideas manifested in wartime.

By beginning the book with an introductory essay, the author proposes his main ideas about crowd behaviour. It differentiates between sociology and psychology, and proposes the idea that the self and its social environment jointly influence the behaviour of the individual. The author introduces the terms "gregariousness", "suggestibility" and "herd instinct" to rationalise how the social environment shapes behaviour, and exemplified his ideas with his observations from the animal world.

The following chapter, titled "Herd Instinct and Its Bearing On the Psychology of the Civilised Man", is the first part of the author's original essay published in The Sociological Review. It continues with the main ideas proposed in the introductory chapter, stating that humans as a gregarious species have a biological tendency for gregariousness, that can influence their behaviour. The main argument describes how suggestibility and the herd instinct contributes to altruism. It also presents the notion of how extrinsic commands and norms formed by the herd become intrinsic to the self through rationalisation, acting as instincts in both social and isolated situations.

The second part of the original chapter, "Sociological Applications of the Psychology of the Herd Instinct", applies the proposed ideas to contemporary society as well as the future development of humans. Based on the theory depicted in the book, it also suggests that the herd instinct manifests in the self as feelings of duty, willpower, obligation, values and norms. The effects of suggestibility are also demonstrated by the rationalisation mechanism behind religion.

The first edition of the book was completed by the chapter "Speculations Upon the Human Mind in 1915"; however, the second edition of 1919 also includes "Postscript of 1919". These two chapters explore the manifestation of herd mentality and gregariousness during wartime as opposed to peace, addressing nationalism, social ideologies, conformity and propaganda as expressions of the herd instinct in the society under profound stress.

== Reception ==
Upon its publication, the book attracted the attention of many contemporary professionals in the field of social psychology. In a contemporary review published in the Australian Quarterly in 1954, T.W. Waddell praises the book's originality, logical clarity and theoretical applicability, while also criticising the author's over-simplified view on the causes of human behaviour and highlighting the book's theories' speculative nature.

In his work published in 1921, Group Psychology and the Analysis of the Ego, Freud repeatedly acknowledged the theories proposed by Trotter's book, further building on its ideas and incorporating them into his own psychoanalytic views about the regressing forces influencing the ego. He acknowledged the biological instinct of group formation, gregariousness and the effects of the herd instinct, only naming two limitations of the work, the disregard of the role of leaders within a group, and Freud's opinion that "it does not entirely escape the antipathies that were set loose by the recent great war." Complementing Trotter's views, Freud concluded that humans are horde animals - "an individual creature in a horde led by a chief."

Next to Freud, Trotter's work was cited by hundreds of subsequent publications, including contemporary work on group analysis by Richard M. Billow, highlighting its relevance in the social psychology field. Beyond its academic influence, the book also held important applications for the general population shaken by the First World War, who were searching for new group norms and answers on how to move on from the war. In the preface and postscript, the author directly addresses this topic, exploring prejudice and wartime behaviour. This grasped the interest of readers who were dealing with the leftover traumas of World War I and were looking for explanations and answers on what led the nations to war. One of these was the writer Vernon Lee, who owned a first edition copy of the book. Critically evaluating the book, Lee's notes disapprove of crowd-theory and a biological essentialist origin of war behaviour, suggesting that the book justifies mass obedience and compliance in an inadequate and dangerous way.

Since its publication, the central topic of the book has evolved from speculative theories to more practical and applied use. Contemporary social psychologists, such as Freud, used Trotter's idea of biological basis of human behaviour and crowd psychology in suggestibility, leadership and group dynamic theories and studies. Subsequently, during the late 20th century, researchers in organisational- and consumer psychology, such as Elton Mayo, adapted crowd behaviour theories to study decision-making and teamwork under leadership. Political scientists and sociologists, like Theodor Adorno, used herd behaviour to explain and understand political movements, propaganda, protests and social conformity, while educational psychologists examined peer influence and learning within groups. The book's original ideas are used in a wide variety of disciplines today, studying the connection between the innate reflex of crowd behaviour and different social phenomena.

After the publication of the book, the author returned to his original field of medicine and surgery. He served as consultant surgeon to King George V, and made contributions to the standard textbooks of surgery, such as System of Surgery and The British Encyclopaedia of Medical Practice, especially focusing on neck and head tumours. In 1928 he became knighted for his work by the king of England.

After the publication of the book, Trotter did not publish further books or articles within the field of social sciences, but he later mentored successful sociologists such as the English psychoanalyst Wilfred Bion.

== Quotes ==
From Instincts of the Herd in Peace and War (1942 ed., pg. 90):

- "It has already been pointed out how dangerous it would be to breed man for reason — that is, against suggestibility. The idea is a fit companion for the device of breeding against “degeneracy”. The degenerate — that is, the mentally unstable – have demonstrated by the mere fact of instability that they possess the quality of sensitiveness to feeling and to experience, for it is this which has prevented them from applying the remedy of rationalization or exclusion when they have met with experience conflicting with the herd suggestion."
- "It is interesting to notice that in discussing the mechanism of psychoanalysis in liberating the ‘abnormal’ patient from his symptoms, Freud repeatedly lays stress on the fact that the efficient factor in the process is not the actual introduction of the suppressed experiences into the conscious field, but the overcoming of the resistances to such an endeavour. I have attempted to show that these resistances or counter-impulses are of environmental origin, and owe their strength to the specific sensitiveness of the gregarious mind. Resistances of similar type and identical origin are responsible for the formation of the so-called normal type of mind. It is a principal thesis of an earlier essay in this book that this normal type is far from being psychologically healthy, is far from rendering available the full capacity of the mind for foresight and progress, and being in exclusive command of directing power in the world, is a danger to civilization."

== Response ==
Writer Vernon Lee owned a first edition of Instincts of the Herd in Peace and War, and wrote marginalia into her copy, taking issue with Trotter's ideas. Her notes criticised Trotter's ideas of organicism and his use of "crowd theory", and disagreed with Trotter's support for the First World War. Lee later wrote her 1932 book Music and its Lovers partly as a response to Trotter's book.

== In popular culture ==
In the James Bond novel Live and Let Die, the villain of the book, Mister Big, speaks about and quotes this book to James Bond, from chapter 21:

"You have doubtless read Trotter's Instincts of the Herd in War and Peace, Mister Bond. Well, I am by nature and predilection a wolf and I live by a wolf's laws. Naturally the sheep describe such a person as a "criminal".

‘The fact, Mister Bond,’ The Big Man continued after a pause, ‘that I survive and indeed enjoy limitless success, although I am alone against countless millions of sheep, is attributable to the modern techniques I described to you on the occasion of our last talk, and to an infinite capacity for taking pains. Not dull, plodding pains, but artistic, subtle pains. And I find, Mister Bond, that it is not difficult to outwit sheep, however many of them there may be, if one is dedicated to the task and if one is by nature an extremely well-equipped wolf."
