= Anne Bernays =

American novelist, editor, and teacher

- Born: September 14, 1930 (age 95); New York City, U.S.
- Education: Barnard College
- Occupations: Novelist; Editor; Teacher
- Spouse: Justin Kaplan (m. 1954; died 2014)
- Children: 3
- Parents: Edward Bernays (father); Doris Fleischman (mother)
- Relatives: Sigmund Freud (paternal great-uncle)

Anne Fleischman Bernays (born September 14, 1930) is an American novelist, editor, and teacher.

== Life ==
Bernays attended the Brearley School on New York City's Upper East Side, graduating in 1948. A 1952 graduate of Barnard College, she was managing editor of discovery, a literary magazine, before moving from New York City to Cambridge, Massachusetts, in 1959 when she began her career as a novelist.

Bernays has been published widely in national magazines and journals and is a long-time teacher of writing at Boston University, Boston College, Holy Cross, Harvard Extension, Nieman Foundation for Journalism at Harvard, and MFA Program at Lesley University.

She is a founder of PEN/New England and a member of the Writer's Union. She serves as chairman of the board of Fine Arts Work Center in Provincetown and co-president of Truro Center for the Arts at Castle Hill.

== Family ==
Her father, Edward L. Bernays, was a nephew of Sigmund Freud and is known as "the father of Public Relations." Bernays appeared in the Adam Curtis series The Century of the Self (2002) where she was critical of her father's shaky commitment to democracy and skill at manipulation. Her mother, Doris E. Fleischman, was a writer and feminist. Both her parents were nonpracticing, highly assimilated, wealthy German-American Jews.

She was married to the biographer and editor Justin Kaplan until his death in 2014; they lived in Cambridge, and Truro, Massachusetts, and had three daughters, Susanna Kaplan Donahue, Hester Margaret Kaplan Stein, and Polly Anne Kaplan Tigges; and six grandchildren.

== Selected novels ==
- Growing up Rich Little, Brown, 1975, ISBN 978-0-316-09188-6. (Edward Lewis Wallant Award)
- Professor Romeo reprint, University Press of New England, 1997, ISBN 978-0-874-51809-2. (a New York Times "Notable Book of the Year")
- Trophy House, Simon and Schuster, 2005, ISBN 978-0-743-28858-3.

She is co-author of three non-fiction books:

- What If? (with Pamela Painter) HarperCollins Publishers, 1990, ISBN 978-0-062-70038-4.
- The Language of Names (with Justin Kaplan) Simon & Schuster, 1999, ISBN 978-0-684-83867-0.
- Back Then (with Justin Kaplan). reprint HarperCollins, 2003, ISBN 978-0-060-95805-3
