= Abraham Brill =

Austrian-American psychiatrist and psychoanalyst

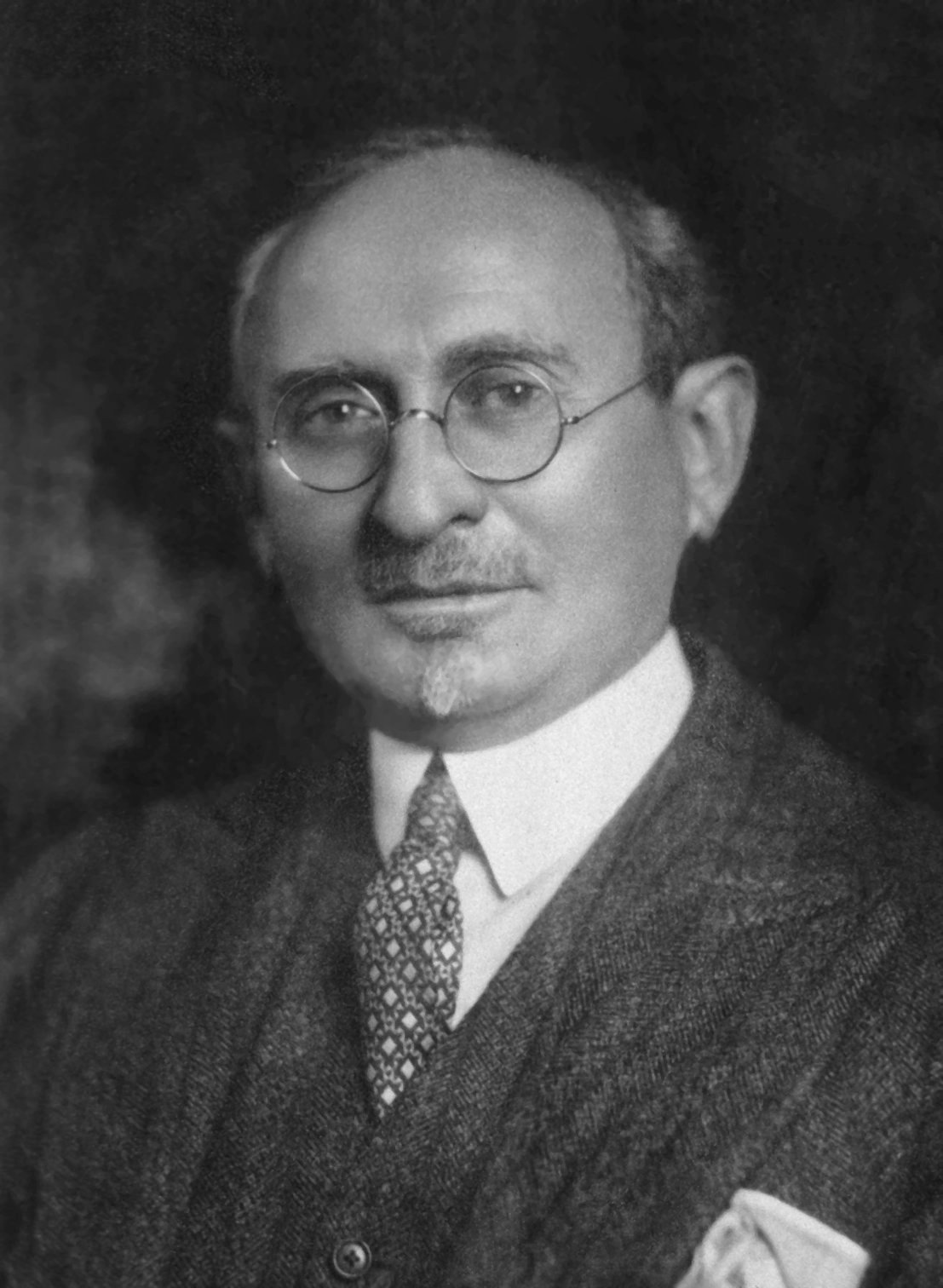
Abraham A. Brill

Abraham Arden Brill (Austrian German: [brɪl]; October 12, 1874 – March 2, 1948) was an Austrian-born American psychiatrist who spent almost his entire adult life in the United States. He was the first psychoanalyst to practice in the United States and the first translator of Sigmund Freud into English.

== Education ==
Brill was born in Kańczuga, Austrian Galicia, to Jewish parents. He arrived in the United States alone and penniless at the age of 15. Working continuously to finance his studies, he eventually graduated from New York University in 1901 and obtained his M.D. from Columbia University in 1903. Ernest Jones commented with admiration: "He might have been called a rough diamond, but there was no doubt about the diamond". Brill spent the next four years working at Central Islip State Hospital on Long Island.

== Life ==
Brill married K. Rose Owen, with whom he had two children. He died at Mount Sinai Hospital in New York City on March 2, 1948, at age 73.

== Career ==
After studying with Eugen Bleuler in Zurich, Switzerland, he met Freud, with whom he maintained a correspondence until Freud's death in 1939. He returned to the United States in 1908 to become one of the earliest and most active exponents of psychoanalysis, being the first to translate into English most of the major works of Freud, as well as books by Jung. His first translation of Freud appeared in 1909 as Some Papers on Hysteria; and while the quality of his translations might at times be challenged, his overall contribution to the fostering of psychoanalysis in America cannot. He campaigned for academic recognition of his field, lectured at Columbia University, and became clinical professor of psychiatry at New York University. He maintained a psychoanalytic practice as well.

In 1911 he founded the New York Psychoanalytic Society (or Institute) and later helped found the American Psychoanalytic Association. The library of the New York Psychoanalytic Institute is named in his honor. Although opposed in principle to lay analysis—"psychoanalysis...can be utilized only by persons who have been trained in anatomy and pathology"—rather than split the International movement, in 1929 he made a tactical concession to Freud and, as head of the New York Psychoanalytic Society, sanctioned the limited introduction of lay analysts to the profession, which had previously restricted its ranks to medical professionals. During the 1930s he played a key role in finding employment for psychiatric professionals exiled from Nazi Europe.

Once sympathetic to homosexuals, he revised his views and wrote in 1940 that "even so-called classical inverts are not entirely free from some paranoid traits".

Edward Bernays consulted with Brill on the subject of women's smoking and borrowed the term "torches of freedom" from Brill.

One of his last pieces of writing - his preface to Eric Berne's 1947 study, The Mind in Action - commends Berne's ability to "expound the new psychology without the affectivity of the older Freudians", placing his tribute in the context of himself "having read everything written on Freud and psychoanalysis since I first introduced him here".

== Publications ==
- Psychoanalysis: Its Theories and Practical Application (1912)
- Fundamental Conceptions of Psychoanalysis (1921)

Translations of Freud

- Selected Papers on Hysteria (1909)
- Three Contributions to the Theory of Sex (1910)
- The Interpretation of Dreams (1913)
- The Psychopathology of Everyday Life (1914)
- Selected Papers on Hysteria and other Psychoneuroses (1912)
- Leonardo da Vinci: A Psychosexual Study of an Infantile Reminiscence (1916)
- Wit and its Relation to the Unconscious (1917)
- Totem and Taboo (1919)
- Studies in Hysteria (1937)

Translations of Jung

- Psychology of Dementia Praecox (1909)

== See also ==
- Sándor Ferenczi
- Otto Rank
