= Torches of Freedom =

Term used to promote female smoking

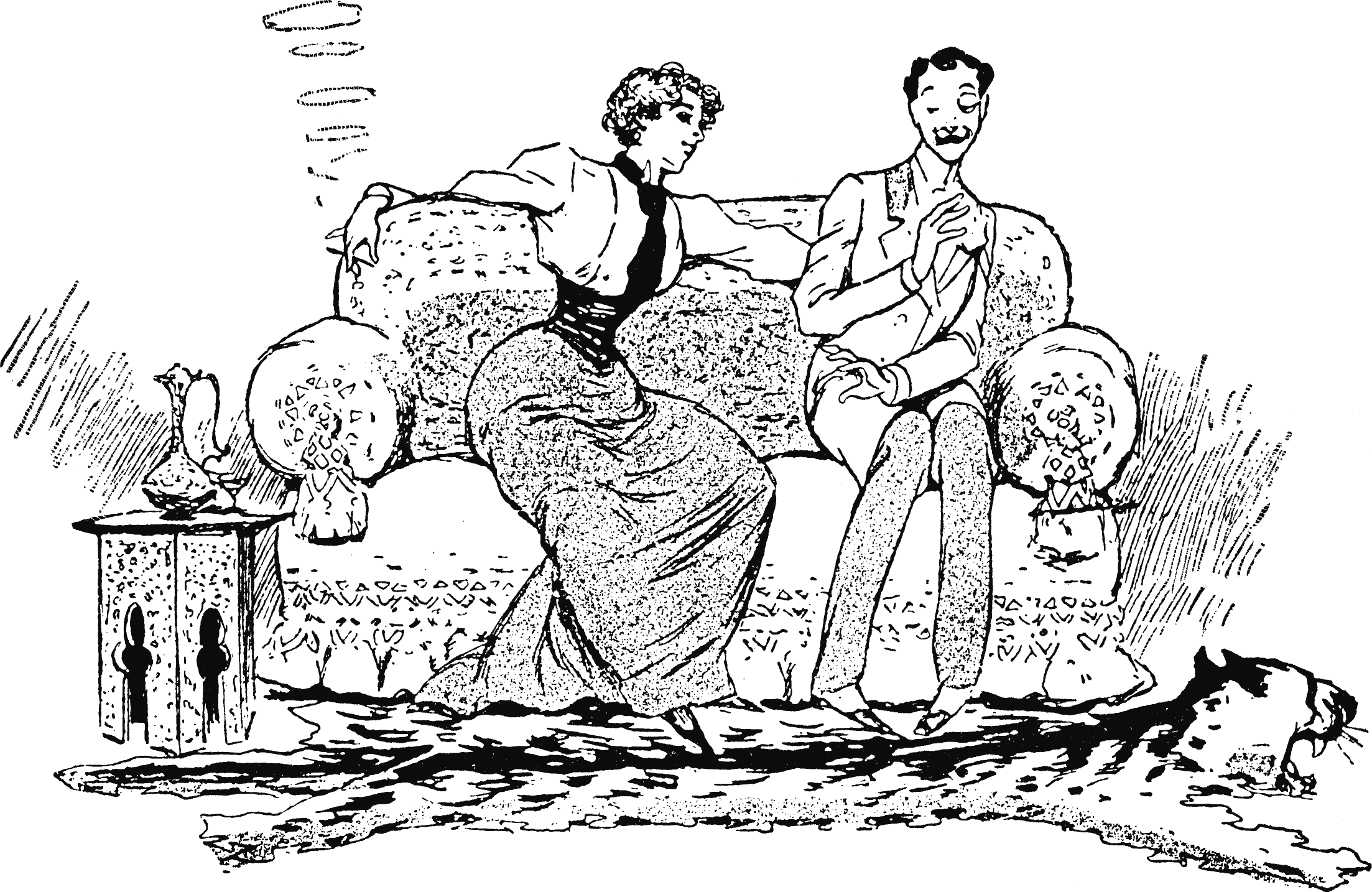
The 1929 "Torches of Freedom" public relations campaign equated smoking in public with female emancipation. Some women had been smoking decades earlier, but usually in private; this 1890s satirical cartoon from Germany illustrates the notion that smoking was considered unfeminine by some in that period.

"Torches of Freedom" was a phrase used to encourage women's smoking using the early twentieth century first-wave feminism in the United States. Cigarettes were described as symbols of emancipation and equality with men. The term was first used by psychoanalyst A. A. Brill when describing the natural desire for women to smoke and was used by Edward Bernays to encourage women to smoke in public despite social taboos. Bernays hired women to march while smoking their "torches of freedom" in the Easter Sunday Parade of 31 March 1929, which was a significant moment for fighting social barriers for women smokers.

== History ==
=== Smoking as an inappropriate act for women ===
Before the twentieth century smoking was seen as a habit that was corrupt and inappropriate for women. Dutch painters used tobacco as a symbol of human foolishness in the 17th century and in the 19th century, cigarettes were perceived as props of "fallen women" and prostitutes. Women's smoking was seen as immoral and some states tried to prevent women from smoking by enforcing laws. In 1904 a woman named Jennie Lasher was sentenced to thirty days in jail for putting her children's morals at risk by smoking in their presence and in 1908 the New York City Board of Aldermen unanimously passed an ordinance that prohibited smoking by women in public. Similarly in 1921 a bill was proposed to prohibit women from smoking in the District of Columbia. Some women's groups also fought against women smoking. The International Tobacco League lobbied for filmmakers to refrain from putting women smoking cigarettes in movies unless the women being portrayed were of "discreditable" character and other women's groups asked young girls to sign pledges saying that they would not use tobacco. These groups saw smoking as an immoral activity and a threat. Yet during World War I as women took the jobs of men who had gone to war, they also began smoking even though it was still considered a taboo act. Cigarettes were marketed as a way for women to challenge social norms and fight for equal rights as men. Eventually for women the cigarette came to symbolize "rebellious independence, glamour, seduction and sexual allure for both feminists and flappers."

=== Advertising to women ===
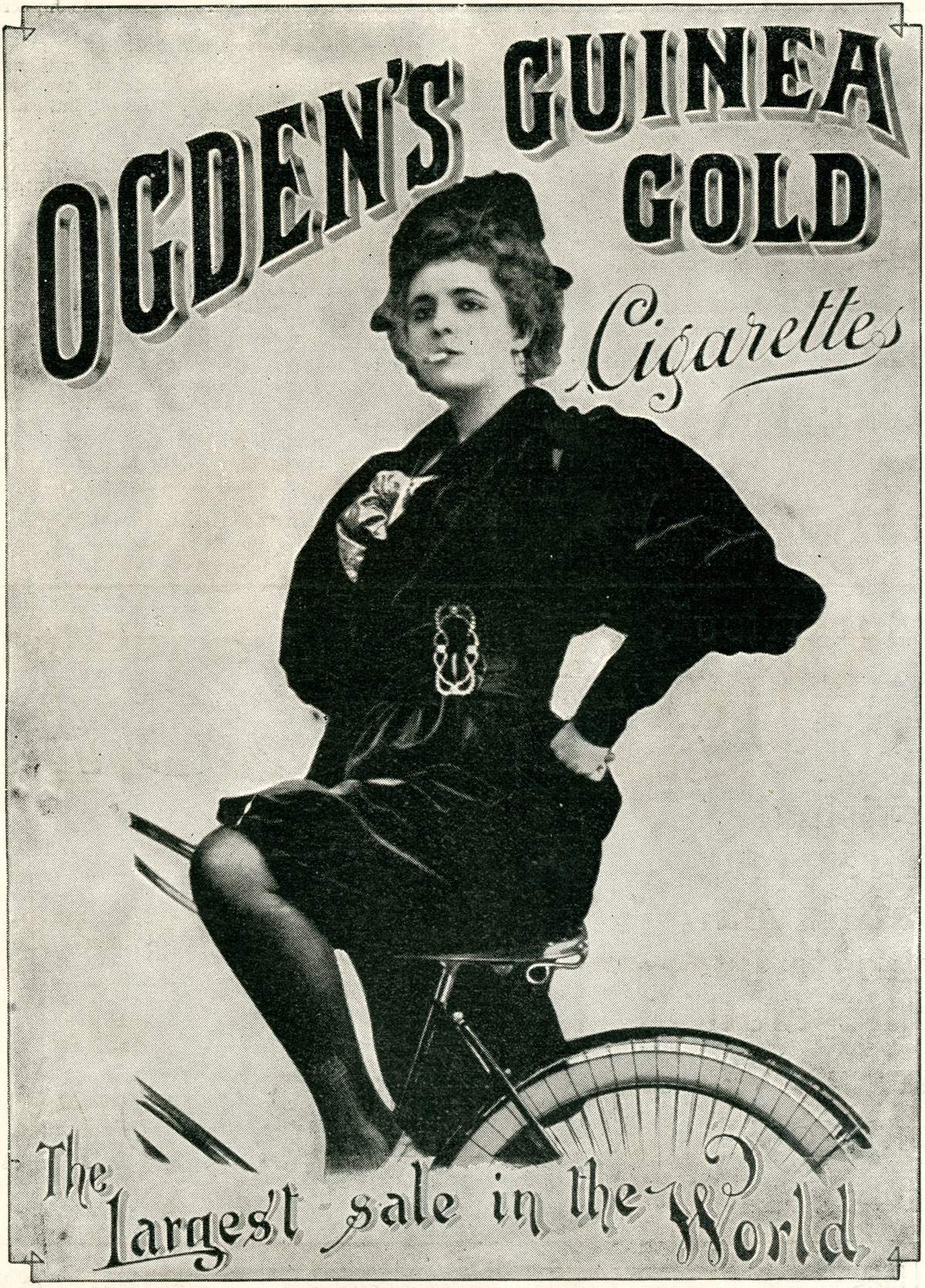
1900 cigarette ad

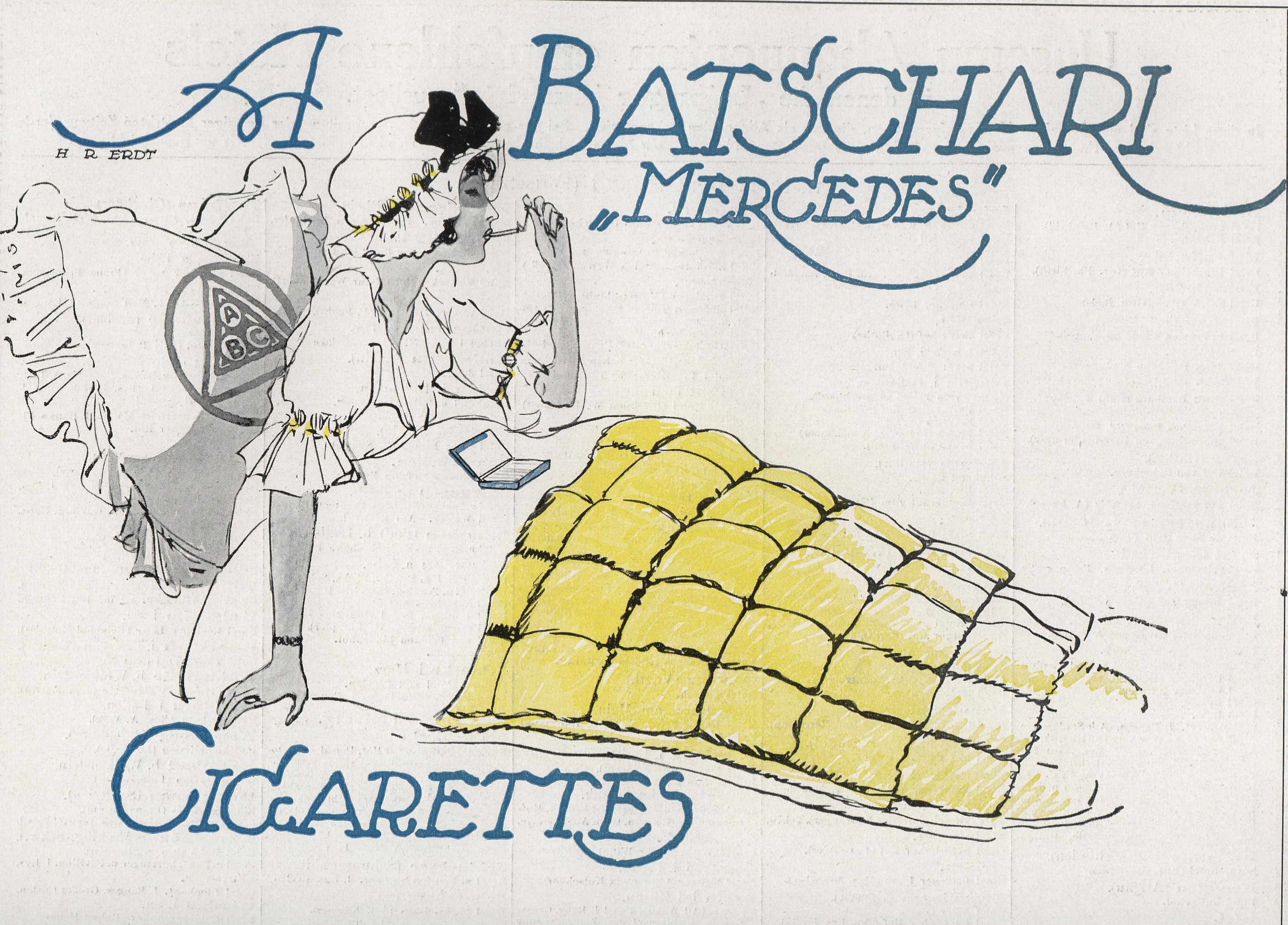
A 1914 ad targeting women. Tobacco companies have long targeted the female market, seeing it as a potential growth area.

Cigarette companies began to increase advertising to women in the late 1920s. In 1928 George Washington Hill, the president of the American Tobacco Company, realized the potential market that could be found in women and said, "It will be like opening a gold mine right in our front yard." Yet some women who were already smoking were seen as smoking incorrectly. In 1919 a hotel manager said that women "don't really know what to do with the smoke. Neither do they know how to hold their cigarettes properly. Actually they make a mess of the whole performance." Tobacco companies had to make sure that women would not be ridiculed for using cigarettes in public and Philip Morris even sponsored a lecture series that taught women the "art of smoking".

To expand the number of women smokers Hill decided to hire Edward Bernays, who today is known as the father of public relations, to help him recruit women smokers. Bernays decided to attempt to eliminate the social taboo against women smoking in public. He gained advice from psychoanalyst A. A. Brill, who stated that it was normal for women to smoke because of oral fixation and said, "Today the emancipation of women has suppressed many of their feminine desires. More women now do the same work as men do. Many women bear no children; those who do bear have fewer children. Feminine traits are masked. Cigarettes, which are equated with men, become torches of freedom." In 1929 Bernays decided to pay women to smoke their "torches of freedom" as they walked in the Easter Sunday Parade in New York. This was a shock because until that time, women were only permitted to smoke in certain places such as in the privacy of their own homes. He was very careful when picking women to march because "while they should be good looking, they should not look too model-y" and he hired his own photographers to make sure that good pictures were taken and then published around the world. Feminist Ruth Hale also called for women to join in the march saying, "Women! Light another torch of freedom! Fight another sex taboo!" Once the footage was released, the women's walk was seen as a protest for equality and sparked discussion throughout the nation. The targeting of women in tobacco advertising led to higher rates of smoking among women. In 1923 women only purchased 5% of cigarettes sold; in 1929 that percentage increased to 12%, in 1935 to 18.1%, peaking in 1965 at 33.3%, and remained at this level until 1977.

== 1990s resurgence ==
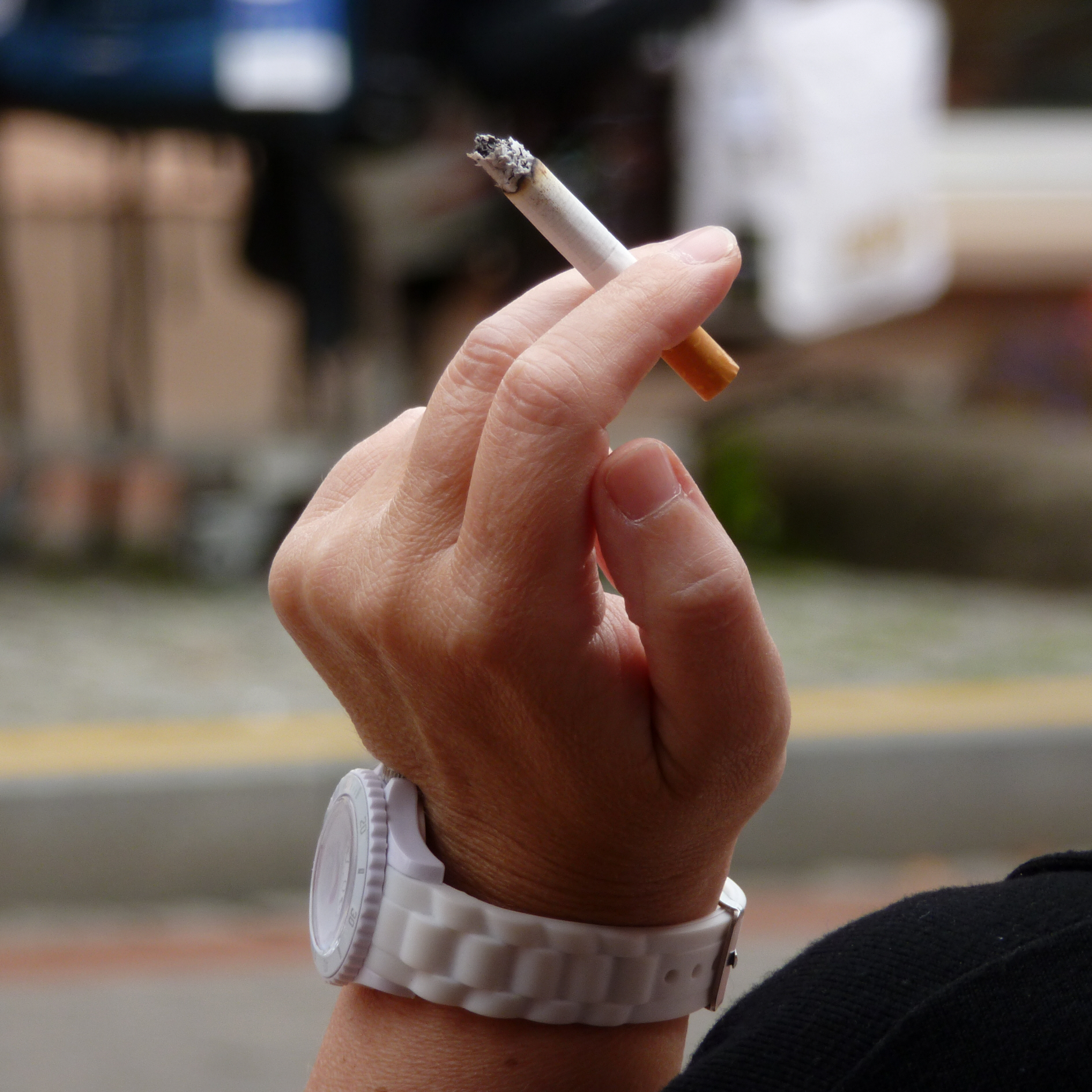
The "Torches of Freedom" idea saw a resurgence in the 1990s far beyond the borders of America, where tobacco advertising was now becoming increasingly restricted.

In the 1990s, tobacco companies continued to advertise cigarettes as "torches of freedom" as they sought to expand their markets around the world. Such brands as Virginia Slims continued to put forward the idea of modernity and freedom in new markets. The use of this imagery when advertising the cigarette has been specifically targeted at women in countries where women are gaining more equality and liberation.

The images used in the advertising campaigns differ by region. In Spain they use images of women in masculine jobs, such as a fighter pilot, to appeal to young women—and the smoking rates among young women in Spain increased from 17% in 1978 to 27% in 1997. Tobacco companies are also using the cigarette as an image of emancipation in eastern and central Europe where cigarettes are shown as symbols of Western freedom. In the 1990s Germany was a focus for advertising, and between 1993 and 1997 the smoking rates among women aged 12–25 in Germany went from 27% to 47% even though the increase in men's smoking for the same age group is much smaller. In Japan, various cigarettes advertised to women have encouraged women to be unique. A survey by the Japanese Ministry of Health and Welfare showed that between 1986 and 1999 smoking among women had increased from 10.5% to 23.2%. Advertisements in South Africa have shown women crossing racial barriers as black women are shown accepting cigarettes from white men and in India women have been portrayed in Western clothes with cigarettes as a sign of liberation and upward mobility. In Asia it is becoming more acceptable for women to smoke and this is leading to a greater demand. Tobacco companies advertise to women around the world, showing cigarettes as symbols of upward mobility, gender equality and freedom. The impacts of tobacco companies targeting women can be seen by the increase in the number of women who started smoking in recent years.

== Negative health effects ==
The initial expansion of female-targeted cigarette marketing during the 1920s, including Edward Bernays's "Torches of Freedom" campaign, marked the beginning of a sustained rise in cigarette smoking among women in the United States. Because chronic diseases associated with tobacco consumption typically manifest after a multi-decade lag period, the population-wide health impacts of this increased uptake did not peak until the late 20th and early 21st centuries.

Epidemiological research tracking 50-year mortality trends demonstrated that as female smoking behaviors gradually matched those of men in initiation age, duration, and intensity, disease outcomes converged as well. Between the 1960s and the 2000s, the relative risk of dying from lung cancer among female current smokers increased nearly tenfold—from 2.7 times higher than never-smokers in the 1960s to 25.7 times higher in 2000–2010—matching the risk ratio of male smokers. Similarly, relative risk of death from chronic obstructive pulmonary disease (COPD) among female smokers rose from 4.0 to 22.5 over the same. By 1987, lung cancer had surpassed breast cancer as the leading cause of cancer-related mortality among American women, a demographic shift directly attributed to the multi-generational cohort effects set in motion by early 20th-century market expansions.

== See also ==
- Nicotine marketing
- Women and smoking
- Public relations campaigns of Edward Bernays
