= Wilfred Trotter =

British head and neck surgeon (1872–1939)

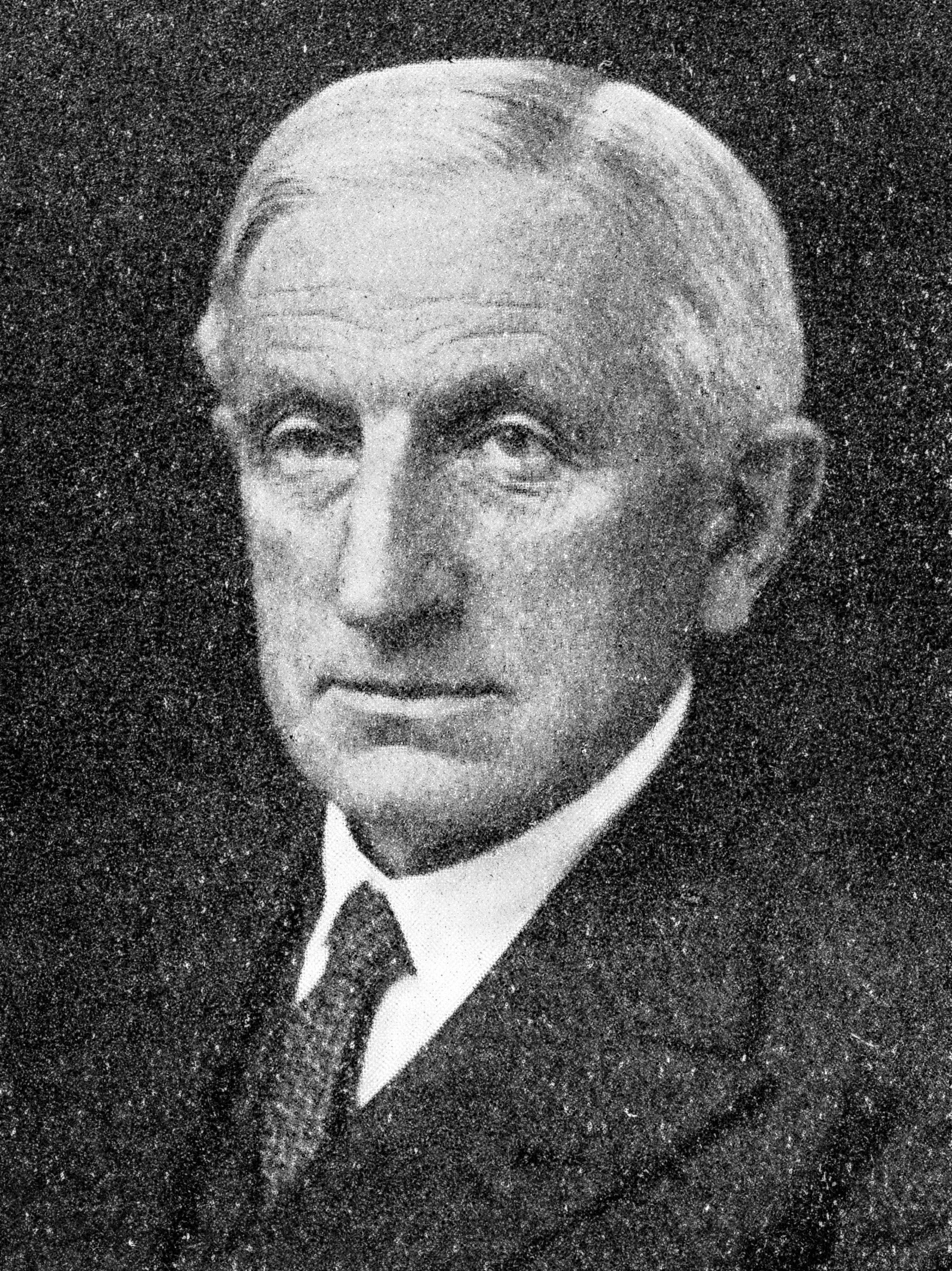
- Born: 3 November 1872; Coleford, Gloucestershire, England
- Died: 25 November 1939 (aged 67); Blackmoor, Hampshire, England
- Known for: Neurosurgery herd instinct
- Awards: Fellow of the Royal Society
- Scientific career
- Fields: Surgery social psychology

Wilfred Batten Lewis Trotter, FRS (3 November 1872 – 25 November 1939) was an English surgeon, a pioneer of neurosurgery. He was also known for his studies concerning social psychology, most notably for his concept of the herd instinct, which he outlined first in two published papers in 1908, and later in his famous popular work Instincts of the Herd in Peace and War (1916), an early classic of crowd psychology. Trotter argued that gregariousness was an instinct, and studied beehives, flocks of sheep and wolf packs.

== Life ==
Working at University College Hospital in London as professor of surgery, he had the office of Honorary Surgeon to King George V from 1928 to 1932. He was also a member of the Council of the Royal Society that conferred their Honorary Membership on Professor Freud, whom he had met earlier at psychoanalytic gatherings, and whom he attended after his relocation to England. He was consulted about Freud's terminal cancer, in 1938. He was elected a Fellow of the Royal Society in May 1931.

Trotter was also the surgeon, at University College London for whom Wilfred Bion worked as a resident during his own medical training, before he famously studied groups and trained as a psychoanalyst at the Tavistock Clinic. In her account of Bion's life "The Days of our Years," his wife, Francesca, writes of the great influence Trotter had on the direction of Bion's work concerning group relations.

Edward Bernays, author of Propaganda and nephew of Freud, also refers to Trotter and Gustave Le Bon in his writings. Trotter met Sigmund Freud several times. According to Ernest Jones (Freud's first biographer), "he was one of the first two or three in England to appreciate the significance of Freud's work, which I came to know through him. He was one of the rapidly diminishing group who attended the first International Congress at Salzburg in 1908".

== Bibliography ==
- Trotter, W. (1908). "Herd instinct and its bearing on the psychology of civilized man – part 1." Sociological Review, July.
- Trotter, W. (1909). "Herd instinct and its bearing on the psychology of civilized man – part 2." Sociological Review, January.
- Trotter, W. (1919). Instincts of the Herd in Peace and War – 4th impression, with postscript. New York, MacMillan.
- Cooke, D. (1987). "Book review – WILFRED TROTTER, Instincts of the herd in peace and war 1916–1919, London, Keynes Press, 1985." Medical History 31(1): 113–4.
- Holdstock, D. (1985). Introduction. in: Instincts of the herd in peace and war 1916-1919. W. Trotter. London, Keynes Press: pp xxviii.
- Rosen, I (2006). "Wilfred Trotter: Surgeon, Philosopher". Can J Surg. 49 (4): 278–280. PMC 3207557. PMID 16948887.

== See also ==
- Crowd psychology
- Ernest Jones
- Group dynamics
- Gustave Le Bon
- J. A. Hadfield
- Wilfred Bion
