= Doris Fleischman =

American women's rights journalist

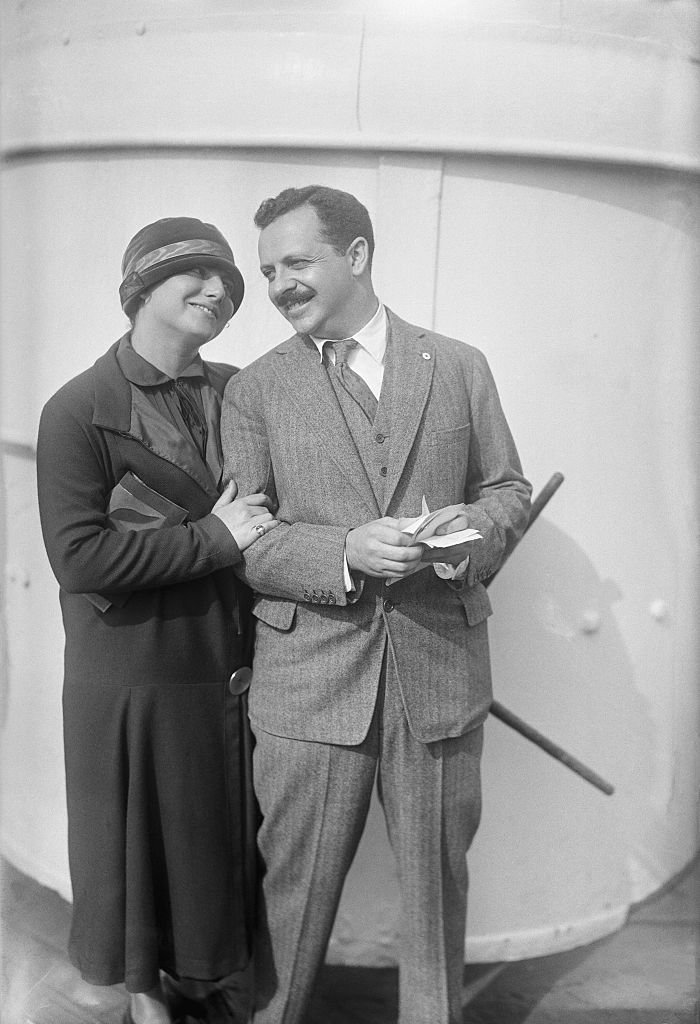
- Doris E. Fleischman and her husband Edward Bernays (March 1923)
- Born: Doris Elsa Fleischman; July 18, 1891; New York City, U.S.
- Died: July 10, 1980 (aged 88); Cambridge, Massachusetts, U.S.
- Education: Barnard College, bachelor's, 1913; Horace Mann School, 1909
- Occupations: Writer, public relations executive, feminist activist
- Spouse: Edward L. Bernays
- Children: Anne Bernays; Doris Bernays

Doris Elsa Fleischman Bernays (July 18, 1891 – July 10, 1980), was an American writer, public relations executive, and feminist activist. Fleischman was a member of the Lucy Stone League, a group which encouraged women to keep their names after marriage. She was the first married woman to be issued a United States passport in her maiden name, Doris Fleischman, in 1925.

== Personal life ==
Doris Fleischman was born to a Jewish family in New York City, New York, on July 18, 1891, the daughter of attorney Samuel Fleischman and Harriet Rosenthal Fleischman. She was one of three children, and was the niece of Sigmund Freud through her marriage to Edward Bernays.

=== Education ===
Fleischman attended Hunter Normal School before graduating from Horace Mann School in 1909. She went on to study philosophy, psychology, and English at Barnard College and graduated with a bachelor's degree in 1913. While attending Barnard, Fleischman enjoyed painting and singing and earned varsity letters in a multitude of activities, including softball, basketball, and tennis. She also studied music and psychiatry and considered each as a career path. In 1917, Fleischman marched in the first Women's Peace Parade in New York City, New York. At this time, she also became an active advocate in the Women's Suffrage Movement.

=== Adult life ===
Fleischman stayed in contact with her childhood friend Edward Bernays throughout her college career. She was friends with his sister, Hella at Barnard, and he helped her get a job at the New York Tribune. In 1919, when Bernays opened a publicity firm, Fleischman was his first hire. They married at New York City Hall in 1922. Immediately after the wedding, she signed into the Waldorf-Astoria Hotel using her maiden name. This was considered extremely unusual and the story made headlines the next morning. She also traveled to Europe, and before doing so, had a passport issued to her under her maiden name. She was the first American woman to do so. Fleischman later became an active member in the Lucy Stone League, which empowered women and urged them to keep their maiden names after marriage.

Fleischman and Bernays became parents to their daughters Doris in 1929 and Anne in 1930. In 1962, Bernays and Fleischman left their home in New York City to move to Cambridge, Massachusetts.

Fleischman died of a stroke in Cambridge, Massachusetts, on July 10, 1980. Her obituary in the New York Times described her as an "enthusiastic feminist."

== Career and publications ==
After graduating from Barnard, Fleischman briefly worked for a New York charity. She left this job in 1914 to write for the women's page at the New York Tribune, where she would eventually be promoted to assistant Sunday editor. At the Tribune, she interviewed a wide variety of people, including everyday people like boarding house resident Margaret Sherer, activists like Rosalie Jones and Ira S. Wile, and public figures like Theodore Roosevelt, Irene Castle, and Jane Addams. She traveled to San Francisco to cover the International Conference of Women Workers to Promote Permanent Peace, and she was the first woman, as far as she knew, to report on a professional boxing match. As a reporter, she often covered women's efforts to live independently, organize politically, and pursue careers that were typically reserved for men. She wrote on many topics, including cooking, fashion, working women's worth and dignity, single women's access to housing and leisure, women's rights to serve in government and war, and men's responsibilities as parents.

Fleischman left the Tribune in 1916, for reasons she never made public. Over the next three years, she took on various freelance writing, publicity, and fundraising assignments. Some of them came from her longtime friend Edward Bernays, who was launching a "publicity direction" firm. She wrote press releases on a freelance basis for Bernays's first two clients: the Lithuanian National Council and the US Department of War.

In 1919, Bernays expanded his firm, renting an office space and hiring Fleischman as a full-time staff writer and "balance wheel". (They both maintained for decades that Bernays had lured Fleischman away from her job at the Tribune, not acknowledging that Fleischman had left that job three years earlier. This version of the story appears in Bernays's memoirs, and in some biographies of Fleischman and Bernays.) Fleischman helped Bernays set up the firm's new office and hire its next few employees. Bernays, Fleischman, and their growing staff promoted products like cottonseed salad oil and radium; films and plays like The Heart of the Jungle and The Famous Mrs. Fair; events hosted by the ACLU, the New York Society for Ethical Culture, and the Women's Non-Partisan Committee for the League of Nations; and a fundraising campaign organized by the New York Federation of Jewish Philanthropies. They also worked on two political campaigns: an effort to remove the American valuation clause from the Fordney–McCumber Tariff Bill, and a brief 1920 attempt by Al Smith to lay groundwork for a presidential run.

After marrying Bernays in 1922, Fleischman became an equal partner in the firm, and wrote its press releases, speeches, and letters. In 1946, she became the vice president of the newly created Edward L. Bernays Foundation. Among her accomplishments were an internal client publication Contact (which explained the nature and value of public relations to clients) and securing press coverage for the NAACP convention in Atlanta. This convention in particular was extremely important, as it was the first to ever be held below the Mason-Dixon line. At the conference, Fleischman experienced discrimination and threats of violence based on her gender, but continued to work to have southern press agencies cover the conference, a difficult feat at the time. She also proved herself by going on to work with important clients like Dwight D. Eisenhower, Sigmund Freud, Jane Addams, Irene Castle, Theodore Roosevelt, and Thomas A. Edison.

In 1927, Fleischman joined the Woman Pays Club. This club was created by a group of women in 1919 with the purpose of mocking a well-known men's club in New York. The members of the Woman Pays Club typically met biweekly and had guests come to speak about fighting prejudice against women. Around this time, Fleischman took her passion for feminism and wrote about women's issues for national publications and had numerous published articles in magazines like Ladies' Home Journal and American Mercury. In addition to articles and columns written for larger publications, she also worked on her own books and journals. In 1928, she published "An Outline of Careers for Women: A Practical Guide to Achievement," which detailed career options available for young women and encouraged them to pursue them. She wrote a chapter for Fred J. Ringel's book, America as Americans See It, and described women's work both in and out of the domestic setting. In 1939, she addressed the importance of women in domestic work at a conference on women's work in the home. Starting with her essay "Notes of a Retiring Feminist," published in the American Mercury in 1949, she began to use her married name Doris Fleischman Bernays professionally.

In 1950, Fleischman was contacted by Ruth Hale, founder of the Lucy Stone League, to help revive her organization which had been inactive for almost two decades following its founding in 1921. Upon the revival of the League, Fleischman served as its vice president and worked with other women who were pioneers in their fields such as Jane Grant, Doris Stevens, Anna M. Kross, and Fannie Hurst. Together, they worked to conduct research about women's pay and women's position in the American economy. In 1952, Fleischman was invited by the director of the Women's Bureau of the U.S. Department of Labor to attend a conference on pay equity and women in the workplace. Later that year, she resigned from her position in the Lucy Stone League. Around this time, Fleischman also began searching for publishers to print a book she had been working on for over three years which detailed the struggles women face in the domestic and professional settings. After being rejected by multiple publishers over the course of two years, Fleischman finally had success with Crown Publishing Company. In 1955, she published her memoir, A Wife Is Many Women, under her married name.

Fleischman moved to Cambridge, Massachusetts with her husband in 1962 so that he could finish writing his book and they could retire together. However, these retirement plans did not last, and Fleischman and Bernays continued to work after they sold their New York office to establish a new public relations business in Cambridge. Upon the establishment of their new "public relations counsel," as Bernays called it, they gained many new clients including the U.S. Department of Commerce; the U.S. Department of Health, Education, and Welfare; the West Valley Community College; and the Massachusetts Law Association.

In 1971, Fleischman joined Theta Sigma Phi, which became the Association for Women in Communications. As an older member, she was enthusiastic about helping students in the organizations, and she gave them advice and helped them land jobs in the field. Theta Sigma Phi awarded her their highest honor, the National Headliner Award, in 1972. Fleischman worked with her husband's agency and Women in Communications, Inc. to develop two competitions that took place in 1974 and 1977. These competitions consisted of submissions by organizations and individuals and sought out the best plans for solutions in pay equity and justice for women in the workplace and the home. Winners received scholarship money to continue research in hopes of making these plans become reality. The Chicago Chapter of Public Relations Society of America recognized Fleischman's work and presented her with a leadership award in 1976.

Towards the end of her career, Fleischman wrote many book reviews for the Worcester Sunday Telegram in Cambridge. With the help of her husband, she also self-published 22 of her own poems in a book called Progression in 1977.
