= Edward Bernays =

American public relations pioneer (1891–1995)

Edward L. Bernays
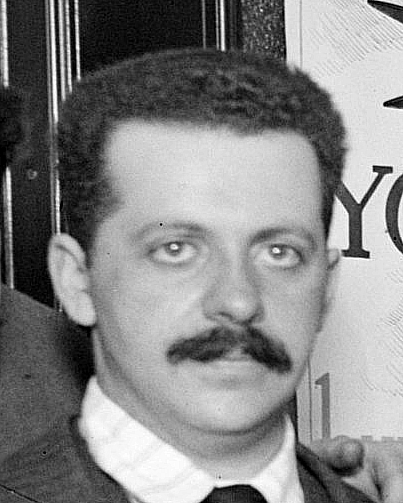
- Bernays in 1917
- Born: Edward Bernays; November 22, 1891; Vienna, Austria-Hungary
- Died: March 9, 1995 (aged 103); Cambridge, Massachusetts, U.S.
- Education: Cornell University (BS)
- Known for: Public relations (campaigns); Advertising; Books; Crystallizing Public Opinion (1923); Propaganda (1928); Public Relations (1945); The Engineering of Consent (1955)
- Spouse: Doris Fleischman (m. 1922; died 1980)
- Children: Doris Held; Anne Bernays
- Parents: Ely Bernays (father); Anna (Freud) Bernays (mother)
- Relatives: Martha Bernays (aunt); Sigmund Freud (uncle); Isaac Bernays (great-grandfather); Marc Randolph (great-nephew); Nicolae Steinhardt (cousin)
- Scientific career
- Fields: Psychology, sociology

Signature
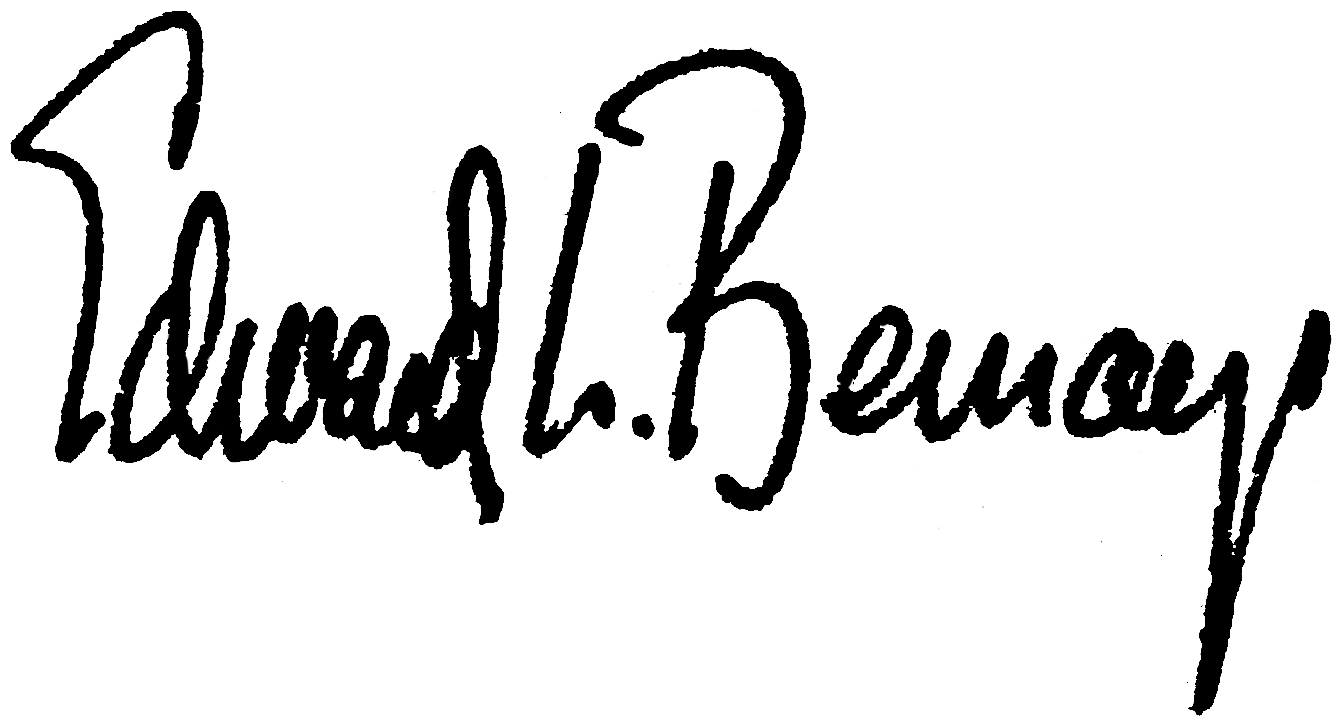

Edward Louis Bernays (/bɜːrˈneɪz/ bur-NAYZ; Austrian German: [bɛrˈnaɪs]; November 22, 1891 − March 9, 1995) was an Austrian-American pioneer in the field of public relations and propaganda, referred to in his obituary as "the father of public relations". While credited with advancing the profession of public relations, his techniques have been criticized for manipulating public opinion, often in ways that undermined individual autonomy and democratic values.

His best-known campaigns include a 1929 effort to promote female smoking by branding cigarettes as feminist "Torches of Freedom", and his work for the United Fruit Company in the 1950s, connected with the CIA-orchestrated overthrow of the democratically elected Guatemalan government in 1954. Bernays's involvement in Guatemala facilitated US imperialism and contributed to decades of civil unrest and repression, raising ethical concerns about his role in undermining democratic governance.

He worked for dozens of major American corporations, including Procter & Gamble and General Electric, and for government agencies, politicians, and non-profit organizations.

Of his many books, Crystallizing Public Opinion (1923) and Propaganda (1928) gained special attention as early efforts to define and theorize the field of public relations. Citing works of writers such as Gustave Le Bon, Wilfred Trotter, Walter Lippmann, and Sigmund Freud (his own double uncle), he described the masses as irrational and subject to herd instinct—and he outlined how skilled practitioners could use crowd psychology and psychoanalysis to control them in desired ways. Bernays later synthesized many of these ideas in his post-war book, Public Relations (1945), which outlines the science of managing information released to the public by an organization, in a manner most advantageous to the organization. He does this by first providing an overview of the history of public relations, and then provides insight into its application.

Bernays was named one of the 100 most influential Americans of the twentieth century by Life. His work has been linked to the rise of modern propaganda techniques that some argue have eroded democratic engagement and suppressed dissent. He was the subject of a full-length biography by Larry Tye entitled The Father of Spin (1999) and later an award-winning 2002 documentary for the BBC by Adam Curtis entitled The Century of the Self.

== Family and education ==
Bernay's 1912 yearbook photo at Cornell University

Edward Bernays was born in Vienna to a Jewish family. His mother, Anna (1858–1955), was Sigmund Freud's sister, and his father Eli (1860–1921) was the brother of Freud's wife, Martha Bernays; their grandfather, Isaac Bernays (through their father Berman), was the chief rabbi of Hamburg and a relative of the poet Heinrich Heine.

The Bernays family moved from Vienna to the United States in the 1890s. After Eli Bernays started working as a grain exporter at the Manhattan Produce Exchange, he sent for his wife and children. In 1892, his family moved to New York City, where Bernays attended DeWitt Clinton High School. In 1912 he graduated from Cornell University with a degree in agriculture, but chose journalism as his first career.

He married Doris E. Fleischman in 1922. Fleischman was a member of the Lucy Stone League, a group which encouraged women to keep their names after marriage.

Later, however, she changed her mind and her name, becoming Doris Bernays. By all accounts, Fleischman played a major though quiet role in the Bernays public relations business—including ghost-writing numerous memos and speeches, and publishing a newsletter.

== Career ==
After graduating from Cornell, Bernays wrote for the National Nurseryman journal. Then he worked at the New York City Produce Exchange, where his father was a grain exporter. He went to Paris and worked for Louis Dreyfus and Company, reading grain cables. By December 1912, he had returned to New York.

=== Medical editor ===
Following a meeting in New York with school friend Fred Robinson, Bernays became co-editor of Medical Review of Reviews and Dietetic and Hygienic Gazette in 1912. They took editorial positions in favor of showers and against corsets, and distributed free copies to thousands of physicians across the country.

Two months later they took up the cause of Damaged Goods, an English translation of Les Avariés by Eugène Brieux. After publishing a positive review of the play, Bernays and Robinson wrote to its lead actor, Richard Bennett: "The editors of the Medical Review of Reviews support your praiseworthy intention to fight sex-pruriency in the United States by producing Brieux's play Damaged Goods. You can count on our help."

The play controversially dealt with venereal disease and prostitution—Bernays called it "a propaganda play that fought for sex education." He created the "Medical Review of Reviews Sociological Fund Committee" and successfully solicited the support of such elite figures as John D. Rockefeller Jr., Franklin Delano Roosevelt and Eleanor Roosevelt, Reverend John Haynes Holmes, and Anne Harriman Sands Rutherford Vanderbilt, wife of William Kissam Vanderbilt.

=== Press agent ===
After his foray into the world of theater, Bernays worked as a creative press agent for various performers and performances. Already, he was using a variety of techniques that would become hallmarks of his later practice. He promoted the Daddy Long Legs stage play by tying it in with the cause of charity for orphans. To create interest in Sergei Diaghilev's Ballets Russes, he educated Americans about the subtleties of ballet—and publicized a picture of Flore Revalles, wearing a tight-fitting dress, at the Bronx Zoo, posed with a large snake. He built up opera singer Enrico Caruso as an idol whose voice was so sensitive that comically extreme measures were taken to protect it.

=== World War I ===
After the US entered the war, the Committee on Public Information (CPI) hired Bernays to work for its Bureau of Latin-American Affairs, based in an office in New York. Bernays, along with Lieutenant F. E. Ackerman, focused on building support for war, domestically and abroad, focusing especially on businesses operating in Latin America. Bernays referred to this work as "psychological warfare".

After fighting ended, Bernays was part of a sixteen-person publicity group working for the CPI at the Paris Peace Conference. A scandal arose from his reference to propaganda in a press release. As reported by the New York World, the "announced object of the expedition is 'to interpret the work of the Peace Conference by keeping up a worldwide propaganda to disseminate American accomplishments and ideals.'"

Bernays later described a realization that his work for the CPI could also be used in peacetime:

There was one basic lesson I learned in the CPI—that efforts comparable to those applied by the CPI to affect the attitudes of the enemy, of neutrals, and people of this country could be applied with equal facility to peacetime pursuits. In other words, what could be done for a nation at war could be done for organizations and people in a nation at peace.

=== Counsel on public relations ===
Bernays, who pursued his calling in New York City from 1919 to 1963, styled himself a "public relations counsel". He had very pronounced views on the differences between what he did and what people in advertising did. A pivotal figure in the orchestration of elaborate corporate advertising campaigns and multi-media consumer spectacles, he is among those listed in the acknowledgments section of the seminal government social science study Recent Social Trends in the United States (1933).

== Notable clients and campaigns ==
Bernays used ideas of his uncle Sigmund Freud to help convince the public, among other things, that bacon and eggs was the true all-American breakfast.

In the 1930s, his Dixie Cup campaign was designed to convince American consumers that only disposable cups were sanitary, by linking the imagery of an overflowing cup with subliminal images of genitalia and venereal disease.

He was publicity director for the 1939 New York World's Fair.

=== Political clients ===
In 1924 Bernays set up a vaudeville "pancake breakfast" for Calvin Coolidge to change his stuffy image prior to the 1924 election. Entertainers including Al Jolson, Raymond Hitchcock, and the Dolly Sisters performed on the White House lawn. The event was widely reported by American newspapers, with The New York Times running the story under the headline "President Nearly Laughs".

A desperate Herbert Hoover consulted with Bernays a month before the 1932 presidential election. Bernays advised Hoover to create disunity within his opposition and to present an image of him as an invincible leader.

Bernays advised William O'Dwyer, in his candidacy for mayor of New York City, on how to appear in front of different demographics. For example, he should tell Irish voters about his actions against the Italian mafia—and Italian voters about his plans to reform the police department. To Jews he should appear as a committed opponent of the Nazis.

He helped to name the President's Emergency Committee for Employment, suggesting this name as preferable to the "Committee for Unemployment".

During World War II, Bernays advised the Office of War Information, as well as the Army and Navy. He was chairman of the National Advisory Committee of the Third U.S. War Loan, co-chairman of the Victory Book campaign, and part of the New York State Defense Council. During the Cold War he advised the United States Information Agency.

Bernays reported turning down the Nazis, Nicaragua under the Somoza family, Francisco Franco, and Richard Nixon as clients.

=== Non-profit clients ===
Bernays also worked on behalf of many non-profit institutions and organizations. These included, to name just a few, the Committee on Publicity Methods in Social Work (1926–1927), the Jewish Mental Health Society (1928), the Book Publishers Research Institute (1930–1931), the New York Infirmary for Women and Children (1933), the Committee for Consumer Legislation (1934), and the Friends of Danish Freedom and Democracy (1940).

=== Freud ===
In 1920, Bernays organized the publication of Freud's Introductory Lectures on Psychoanalysis in the U.S., sending royalty money to his uncle in Vienna. Freud turned down further offers at promotion, such as a possible lecture tour and an invitation to write 3,000-word newspaper columns, for $1,000 each, on topics such as "The Wife's Mental Place in the Home" and "What a Child Thinks About."

=== Tobacco ===
In 1927, Bernays worked briefly for Liggett and Myers, makers of Chesterfield cigarettes. He pulled a stunt against the competing brand, Lucky Strike, which involved mocking the endorsements of opera singers who said Lucky Strikes were "kind to your voice". George Washington Hill, head of the American Tobacco Company, which made Lucky Strike, promptly hired Bernays away from Liggett and Myers.

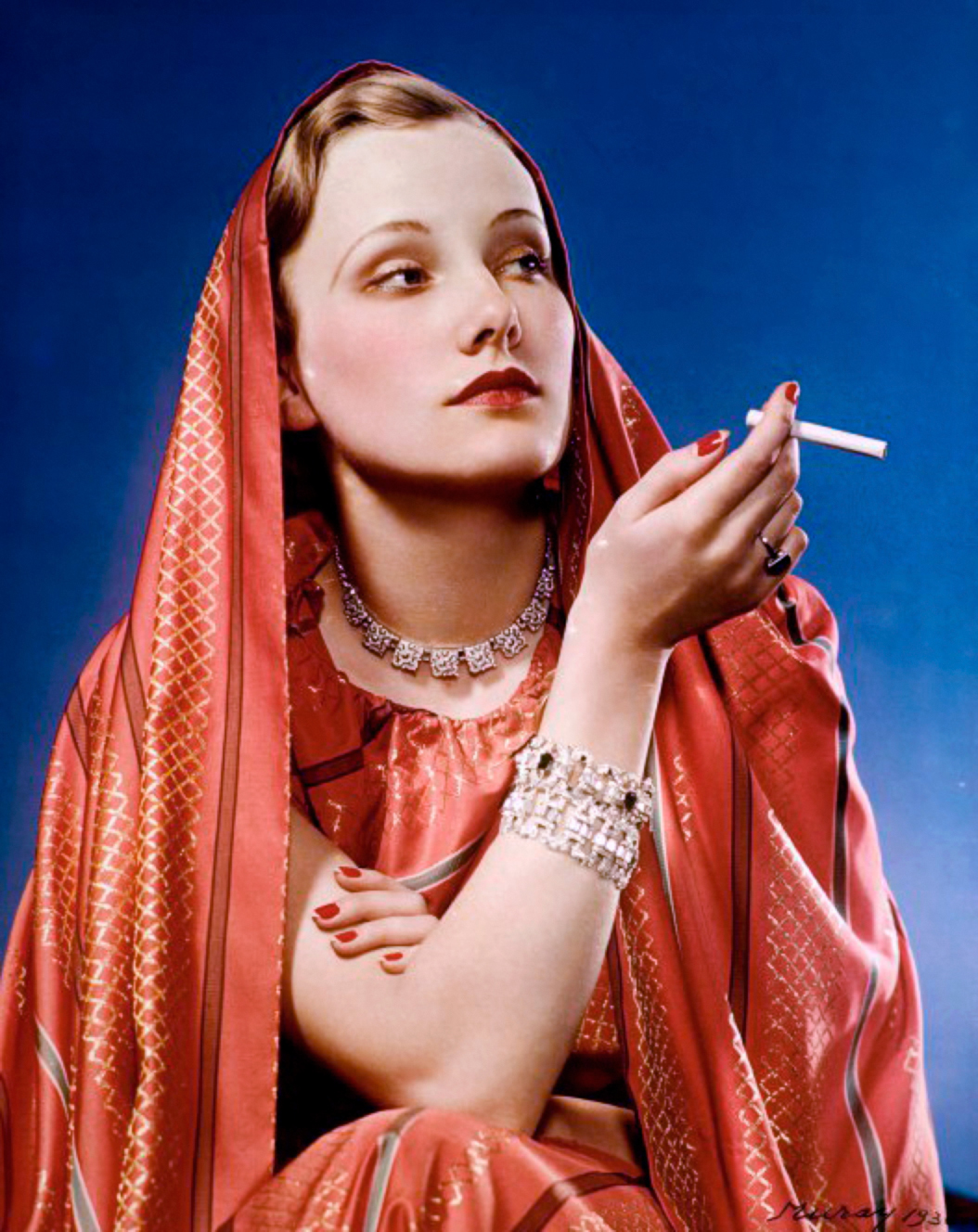
"Girl in Red" advertisement for Lucky Strike; shot by Nickolas Muray, a photographer enlisted by Bernays to help popularize feminine thinness and cigarette smoking

When he started working for American Tobacco Company, Bernays was given the objective of increasing Lucky Strike sales among women, who, for the most part, had formerly avoided smoking. The first strategy was to persuade women to smoke cigarettes instead of eating. Bernays began by promoting the ideal of thinness itself, using photographers, artists, newspapers, and magazines to promote the special beauty of thin women. Medical authorities were found to promote the choice of cigarettes over sweets. Home-makers were cautioned that keeping cigarettes on hand was a social necessity.

==== Torches of Freedom ====
The first campaign succeeded; women smoked more cigarettes; American Tobacco Company brought in more revenue; and Lucky Strike led the market in growth. But a taboo remained on women smoking in public. Bernays consulted with psychoanalyst Abraham Brill, a student of Freud's, who reported to him that cigarettes represented "torches of freedom" for women whose feminine desires were increasingly suppressed by their role in the modern world.

Bernays wrote:

Because it should appear as news with no division of the publicity, actresses should be definitely out. On the other hand, if young women who stand for feminism—someone from the Women's Party, say—could be secured, the fact that the movement would be advertised too, would not be bad. . . While they should be goodlooking, they should not be too 'model-y.' Three for each church covered should be sufficient. Of course they are not to smoke simply as they come down the church steps. They are to join in the Easter parade, puffing away.

The march went as planned, as did the ensuing publicity, with ripples of women smoking prominently across the country.

==== Green Ball ====
In 1934, Bernays was asked to deal with women's apparent reluctance to buy Lucky Strikes because their green and red package clashed with standard female fashions. When Bernays suggested changing the package to a neutral color, Hill refused, saying that he had already spent millions advertising the package. Bernays then worked to make green a fashionable color.

The centerpiece of his efforts was the Green Ball, a social event at the Waldorf Astoria, hosted by Narcissa Cox Vanderlip. The pretext for the ball and its unnamed underwriter was that proceeds would go to charity. Famous society women would attend wearing green dresses. Manufacturers and retailers of clothing and accessories were advised of the excitement growing around the color green. Intellectuals were enlisted to give highbrow talks on the theme of green. Before the ball had taken place, newspapers and magazines (encouraged in various ways by Bernays's office) had latched on to the idea that green was all the rage.

==== Modus operandi ====
Throughout the job, Bernays concealed the fact that he was working for the American Tobacco Company, and succeeded in keeping his own name out of the affair as well. Staff were instructed never to mention his name. Third parties were used, and various notable people received payments to promote smoking publicly as if on their own initiative. Decades later, however, Bernays boasted about his role.

Bernays did not smoke cigarettes himself, and persistently tried to induce his wife Doris to quit.

=== United Fruit and Guatemala ===
The United Fruit Company (Chiquita) hired Bernays in the early 1940s for the purpose of promoting banana sales within the United States, which he did by linking bananas to good health and to American interests and by placing them strategically in the hands of celebrities, in hotels, and other conspicuous places. Bernays also argued that United Fruit needed to put a positive spin on the banana-growing countries themselves, and for this purpose created a front group called the Middle America Information Bureau, which supplied information to journalists and academics.

United Fruit shut down the Middle America Information Bureau in 1948 under the new presidency of Thomas Dudley Cabot. Bernays resented this change but stayed on with the company, for a reported annual fee of more than $100,000 (equivalent to nearly $1.27 million in 2023).

In 1952, Guatemala' s democratically elected President Jacobo Arbenz seized 40% of United Fruit's Guatemalan land holdings. United Fruit engaged Bernays, who worked on the national press and successfully drummed up coverage of Guatemala's 'Communist menace'.

He recommended a campaign in which universities, lawyers, and the U.S. government would all condemn expropriation as immoral and illegal; the company should use media pressure "to induce the President and State Department to issue a policy pronouncement comparable to the Monroe Doctrine concerning expropriation." In the following months, The New York Times, the New York Herald Tribune, Time, Newsweek, and the Atlantic Monthly had all published articles describing the threat of Communism in Guatemala. A Bernays memo in July 1951 recommended that this wave of media attention should be translated into action by promoting:

(a) a change in present U.S. ambassadorial and consular representation, (b) the imposition of congressional sanctions in this country against government aid to pro-Communist regimes, (c) U.S. government subsidizing of research by disinterested groups like the Brookings Institution into various phases of the problem.

Per Bernays's strategy, United Fruit distributed favorable articles and an anonymous Report on Guatemala to every member of Congress and to national "opinion molders". They also published a weekly Guatemala Newsletter and sent it to 250 journalists, some of whom used it as a source for their reporting. Bernays formed close relationships with journalists including The New York Times reporter Will Lissner and columnist Walter Winchell. In January 1952 he brought a cohort of journalists from various notable newspapers on a tour of Guatemala, sponsored by the company. This technique proved highly effective and was repeated four more times.

In June 1954, the U.S. Central Intelligence Agency effected a coup d'état code-named Operation PBSuccess. The CIA backed a minimal military force, fronted by Carlos Castillo Armas, with a psychological warfare campaign to portray military defeat as a foregone conclusion. During the coup itself, Bernays was the primary supplier of information for the international newswires Associated Press, United Press International, and the International News Service.

Following the coup, Bernays built up the image of Guatemala's new president Carlos Castillo Armas, giving advice for his public appearances both in Guatemala and in the U.S. In 1956, Bernays produced a pamphlet comparing the Communist way and the Christian way.

In 1959, United Fruit dispensed with all external advisors including Bernays.

== Techniques ==
=== Third parties ===
Bernays argued that the covert use of third parties was morally legitimate because those parties were morally autonomous actors.

"If you can influence the leaders, either with or without their conscious cooperation, you automatically influence the group which they sway", he said. In order to promote sales of bacon, for example, he conducted research and found that the American public ate very light breakfast of coffee, maybe a roll and orange juice. He went to his physician and found that a heavy breakfast was sounder from the standpoint of health than a light breakfast because the body loses energy during the night and needs it during the day. He asked the physician if he would be willing, at no cost, to write to 5,000 physicians and ask them whether their judgment was the same as his—confirming his judgment. About 4,500 answered back, all concurring that a more significant breakfast was better for the health of the American people than a light breakfast. He arranged for this finding to be published in newspapers throughout the country with headlines like '4,500 physicians urge bigger breakfast' while other articles stated that bacon and eggs should be a central part of breakfast and, as a result of these actions, the sale of bacon went up.

Describing the response to his campaign for Ivory Soap, Bernays wrote: "As if actuated by the pressure of a button, people began working for the client instead of the client begging people to buy."

Businesses found these covert methods irresistible. Strother Walker and Paul Sklar wrote in Business Finds Its Voice (1938) that Bernays had offered a solution to popular skepticism of business which arose in the depression: better "to implant an idea in a group leader's mind and let him spread it than to write up an idea and send it to the papers as a release, in the old-fashioned way …".

=== Scientific approach ===
Bernays pioneered the public relations industry's use of mass psychology and other social sciences to design its public persuasion campaigns: "If we understand the mechanism and motives of the group mind, is it not possible to control and regiment the masses according to our will without their knowing about it? The recent practice of propaganda has proved that it is possible, at least up to a certain point and within certain limits." He later called this scientific technique of opinion-molding the engineering of consent.

Bernays expanded on Walter Lippmann's concept of stereotype, arguing that predictable elements could be manipulated for mass effects:

But instead of a mind, universal literacy has given [the common man] a rubber stamp, a rubber stamp inked with advertising slogans, with editorials, with published scientific data, with the trivialities of tabloids and the profundities of history, but quite innocent of original thought. Each man's rubber stamp is the twin of millions of others, so that when these millions are exposed to the same stimuli, all receive identical imprints. [...] The amazing readiness with which large masses accept this process is probably accounted for by the fact that no attempt is made to convince them that black is white. Instead, their preconceived hazy ideas that a certain gray is almost black or almost white are brought into sharper focus. Their prejudices, notions, and convictions are used as a starting point, with the result that they are drawn by a thread into passionate adherence to a given mental picture.

Not only psychology but sociology played an important role for the public relations counsel, according to Bernays. The individual is "a cell organized into the social unit. Touch a nerve at a sensitive spot and you get an automatic response from certain specific members of the organism."

== Philosophy ==
Bernays touted the idea that the "masses" are driven by factors outside their conscious understanding, and therefore that their minds can and should be manipulated by the capable few. "Intelligent men must realize that propaganda is the modern instrument by which they can fight for productive ends and help to bring order out of chaos."

The conscious and intelligent manipulation of the organized habits and opinions of the masses is an important element in democratic society. Those who manipulate this unseen mechanism of society constitute an invisible government which is the true ruling power of our country. ... We are governed, our minds are molded, our tastes formed, our ideas suggested, largely by men we have never heard of. This is a logical result of the way in which our democratic society is organized. Vast numbers of human beings must cooperate in this manner if they are to live together as a smoothly functioning society. ... In almost every act of our daily lives, whether in the sphere of politics or business, in our social conduct or our ethical thinking, we are dominated by the relatively small number of persons ... who understand the mental processes and social patterns of the masses. It is they who pull the wires which control the public mind.

— – Propaganda (1928) pp. 9–10

Propaganda was portrayed as the only alternative to chaos.

One way Bernays reconciled manipulation with liberalism was his claim that the human masses would inevitably succumb to manipulation—and therefore the good propagandists could compete with the evil, without incurring any marginal moral cost. In his view, "the minority which uses this power is increasingly intelligent, and works more and more on behalf of ideas that are socially constructive."

Unlike some other early public relations practitioners, Bernays advocated centralization and planning. Marvin Olasky calls his 1945 book Take Your Place at the Peace Table "a clear appeal for a form of mild corporate socialism."

== Death and legacy ==
External videos
- Discussion with Edward Bernays (age 97) at the American University School of Communications, January 23, 1989, C-SPAN
- Discussion of Propaganda with Anne Bernays (daughter of Edward Bernays) and NYU professor Mark Crispin Miller, September 29, 2004, C-SPAN

Edward Bernays died in 1995 at the age of 103, in his Cambridge, Massachusetts home. In his obituary, The New York Times said that "Over the years, he was instrumental in the formation of opinion-shaping methods that were used on behalf of many business and industrial enterprises, welfare and civic groups, and governments at home and abroad."

Near his 100th birthday, he led an unsuccessful campaign to pass legislation in Massachusetts and other states requiring public relations practitioners to be licensed.

Much of Bernays's reputation today stems from his persistent public relations campaign to build his own reputation as "America's No. 1 Publicist". During his active years, many of his peers in the industry were offended by Bernays's continuous self-promotion. According to Scott Cutlip, "Bernays was a brilliant person who had a spectacular career, but, to use an old-fashioned word, he was a braggart."

Bernays attracted positive and negative attention for his grand statements about the role of public relations in society. Reviewers praised Crystallizing Public Opinion (1923) as a pioneering study of the importance of something called public opinion. Propaganda (1928) drew more criticism for its advocacy of mass manipulation.

In the 1930s, his critics became more harsh. As the leading figure in public relations and a notorious advocate of "propaganda", Bernays was compared to European fascists such as Joseph Goebbels and Adolf Hitler. (Bernays wrote in his 1965 autobiography that Goebbels read and used his books.)

Rather than retreating from the spotlight, Bernays continued to play up his ideas—for example, stating in a 1935 speech to the Financial Advertisers Association that strong men (including publicists) should become human symbols to lead the masses. On other occasions he tempered this message with the idea that, while propaganda is inevitable, the democratic system allows a pluralism of propaganda, while fascist systems offer only a single official propaganda.

At the same time, Bernays was praised for his apparent success, wisdom, foresight, and influence as an originator of public relations.

While opinions ranged from negative to positive, there was widespread agreement that propaganda had a powerful effect on the public mind. According to John Stauber and Sheldon Rampton, in a published review of Larry Tye's biography of Bernays:

It is impossible to fundamentally grasp the social, political, economic and cultural developments of the past 100 years without some understanding of Bernays and his professional heirs in the public relations industry. PR is a 20th-century phenomenon, and Bernays—widely eulogized as the "father of public relations" at the time of his death in 1995—played a major role in defining the industry's philosophy and methods.

The Edward L Bernays Foundation, founded in 1949, is still active and incorporated in Northampton, Massachusetts.

== Publications ==
=== Books ===
- Bernays, Edward L.; Hoffenstein, Samuel; Kingsley, Walter J.; Pemberton, Murdock (1917). The Broadway Anthology. New York: Duffield & Co.
- Bernays, Edward L. (1923). Crystallizing Public Opinion. New York: Boni and Liveright. OCLC 215243834.
- Bernays, Edward L. (1927). A Public Relations Counsel. New York: Privately printed.
- Bernays, Edward L. (1927). An Outline of Careers: A Practical Guide to Achievement by Thirty-Eight Eminent Americans. New York: George H. Doran Company.
- Verdict of Public Opinion on Propaganda (1927).
- Bernays, Edward L. (1928). Propaganda. New York: Horace Liveright. LCCN 28028779.
- This Business of Propaganda (1928).
- Universities—Pathfinders in Public Opinion (1937).
- Careers for Men: A Practical Guide to Opportunity in Business, Written by Thirty-Eight Successful Americans (1939).
- Speak Up for Democracy: What You Can Do—A Practical Plan of Action for Every American Citizen. New York: The Viking Press (1940).
- Future of Private Enterprise in the Post-War World (1942).
- Democratic Leadership in Total War (1943).
- Psychological Blueprint for the Peace—Canada, U.S.A. (1944).
- Public Relations (1945).
- Bernays, Edward L. (1945). Your Place at the Peace Table. What You Can Do to Win a Lasting United Nations Peace (PDF). New York: The Gerent Press.
- What the British Think of Us: A Study of British Hostility to America and Americans and Its Motivation, with Recommendations for Improving Anglo-American Relations, with Doris Fleischman (1950).
- The Engineering of Consent (as contributor). Norman: University of Oklahoma Press (1955). OCLC 550584.
- Your Future in Public Relations (1961).
- Survey of the World's Greatest Square Mile: Manhattan Island Below Fulton Street. New York: One Wall Street (1964).
- Biography of an Idea: Memoirs of Public Relations Counsel. New York: Simon and Schuster (1965).
- The Case for Reappraisal of U.S. Overseas Information Policies and Programs (Incorporating Congressman Fascell's Report), with Burnet Hershey, eds. New York: Praeger (1970).

=== Selected articles ===
- "The Minority Rules." The Bookman (Apr. 1927), pp. 150–155.
- "Manipulating Public Opinion: The Why and the How." American Journal of Sociology, vol. 33, no. 6 (May 1928).
- "The Marketing of National Policies: A Study of War Propaganda." Journal of Marketing, vol. 6, no. 3 (Jan. 1942). JSTOR 1245869.
- "Attitude Polls—Servants or Masters?" Public Opinion Quarterly, vol. 9, no. 3 (Autumn 1945).
- "The Engineering of Consent." Annals of the American Academy of Political and Social Science, vol. 250 (Mar. 1947).
- "An Educational Program for Unions." Industrial and Labor Relations Review, vol. 1, no. 1 (Oct. 1947). JSTOR 2518569.
- "Emergence of the Public Relations Counsel: Principles and Recollections." Business History Review, vol. 45, no.3 (Autumn 1971). JSTOR 3113663.

== See also ==
- The Culture of Narcissism (1979)
- Propaganda: The Formation of Men's Attitudes
