= List of Ethical Culture Fieldston School alumni =

Graduates and former students of Fieldston school

This list of alumni of Ethical Culture Fieldston School includes graduates and non-graduate former students.

- Jill Abramson – former executive editor of The New York Times
- Carolyn Adams – dancer, choreographer, teacher
- Debo Adegbile – civil rights attorney
- Clifford Alexander Jr. – former secretary of the Army
- George J. Ames – former Lazard executive
- Joseph Amiel – author
- Diane Arbus – photographer
- Mary T. Bassett – physician and public health researcher and public advocate
- Melinda Beck – artist
- Richard D. Brown – historian of colonial and revolutionary-era America; professor emeritus at the University of Connecticut
- Nancy Cantor – chancellor, Syracuse University
- Peter H. Christensen – academic
- Ernest Courant – physicist, known as the "father of modern particle accelerators"
- Jerry Craft – children's book author, cartoonist
- Ralph de Toledano – author
- Glen de Vries – entrepreneur in the field of medical science and pharmacology
- Andrew Delbanco – critic and author; director of American studies, Columbia University
- Nicholas Delbanco – novelist
- David Denby – film critic, The New Yorker
- Joseph Leo Doob – mathematician
- Douglas Durst – real estate magnate
- Jeff Eliasoph - television news anchor
- Francis Fergusson – literary critic and writer
- David Frankel – film maker
- Rita Gam – film actress
- Jim Gardner – longtime WPVI-TV news anchor
- Alan Gilbert – music director of the New York Philharmonic
- Ailes Gilmour – dancer
- Leonie Gilmour – educator and writer
- Rob Glaser – internet pioneer
- Matt Goldman – performance artist
- Maggie Haberman – The New York Times political reporter
- Patricia Harris – former deputy mayor of NYC, president of Bloomberg Philanthropies
- Judith Lewis Herman – psychiatrist
- Charles Herman-Wurmfeld – film director
- Robert Jervis – political scientist, Adlai E. Stevenson Professor, Columbia University
- Elizabeth Jonas – physician, neuroscientist, and professor, Yale School of Medicine
- Rodney Jones – jazz guitarist
- Bess Kalb – comedic writer, author and writer
- Jeffrey Katzenberg – film producer, media mogul
- Yosuke Kawasaki – violinist
- Sinah Estelle Kelley – chemist
- William Melvin Kelley – author (A Different Drummer, Dunfords Travels Everywhere)
- Charlie King – New York civic leader and politician
- Arthur Kinoy – civil rights lawyer
- Ernest Kinoy – screenwriter
- Walter Koenig – actor
- Joseph Kraft – public affairs columnist
- Jake Lamar – author, writer and playwright
- Louise Lasser – actress
- Christopher Lehmann-Haupt – author, The New York Times book reviewer
- Sean Ono Lennon – musician (did not graduate from Fieldston)
- Eda LeShan – child psychologist and author
- Carl P. Leubsdorf – Washington bureau chief, Dallas Morning News
- Doug Liman – film director (Bourne Identity, Mr. & Mrs. Smith)
- Susie Linfield – author, critic, editor and NYU professor
- Andrew Litton – conductor, New York City Ballet
- Beulah Livingstone – motion picture publicist
- Douglas Lowenstein – president and CEO of Private Equity Council, founder and former president of Entertainment Software Association
- Nicholas Lowry – auctioneer, poster expert and media personality
- Douglas Lowy – cancer biologist; director of U.S. National Cancer Institute
- Staughton Lynd – peace activist and civil rights activist
- Jeffrey Lyons – film critic, WNBC-TV, New York City
- Bob Marshall – conservationist, writer, and the founder of the Wilderness Society
- Andy Marvel – award-winning musician
- Grace M. Mayer – curator at the Museum of the City of New York and the Museum of Modern Art
- Jane Mayer – best selling author, investigative journalist, The New Yorker
- Zach McGowan – actor
- Marguerita Mergentime – industrial designer
- Nicholas Meyer – film director
- Mark A. Michaels – author and sexuality educator
- Jo Mielziner – stage designer
- Olivette Miller – jazz harpist
- Marvin Minsky – pioneer in artificial intelligence at MIT
- Tim Minton – television journalist and media executive
- Alfred Mirsky – cell biologist
- Jeannette Mirsky – writer
- Frederic S. Mishkin – governor of the Federal Reserve Board
- Joan Morgan – Jamaican-American writer and author
- Howard Nemerov – former United States Poet Laureate
- J. Robert Oppenheimer (1904–1967) – physicist, scientific director of the Manhattan Project, "father of the atomic bomb"
- Jeremiah Ostriker – astrophysicist, Columbia University, Princeton University (provost 1995–2001)
- Eleanor Pepper (1904–1997) – architect, interior designer
- Marjorie Perloff (1931–2024) – poetry scholar and critic, known for her study of avant-garde poetry
- Emanuel R. Piore (1908–2000, class of 1926) – chief scientist of IBM, and electrical engineering pioneer
- Belva Plain (1915–2010) – author
- Letty Cottin Pogrebin (born 1939) – author
- Susan Poser (born 1963) – president of Hofstra University
- Eve M. Troutt Powell – historian of Middle East Studies
- Edward R. Pressman (1943–2023) – film producer
- Richard Ravitch – business and civic leader
- Nancy Reiner – graduating as Nancy Russek, cover artist of Jimi Hendrix album The Cry of Love (1971), among others
- Jonathan Rosand – neurologist, Massachusetts General Hospital
- Menachem Z. Rosensaft – attorney and founding chairman of the International Network of Children of Jewish Survivors
- Dan Rottenberg – journalist and author
- Muriel Rukeyser – poet and playwright
- David Sarasohn – associate editor and syndicated columnist for The Oregonian newspaper
- James H. Scheuer – US congressman (NY)
- Steven H. Scheuer – film and television historian and critic
- Daniel P. Schrag – climate scientist, geologist Harvard University
- Deborah Schrag – oncologist, Memorial Sloan Kettering Cancer Center
- Gil Scott-Heron – musician
- Nicole Seligman – lawyer, Sony executive
- Alex Shapiro – composer and creator advocate
- Cynthia Propper Seton – novelist
- Laura Silber – author, former journalist and vice president for Advocacy and Communications at the Open Society Foundations
- Mariko Silver – former president of Bennington College, president of Luce Foundation
- Lucy Simon – composer, singer
- Stephen Slesinger – creator of the Red Ryder comic strip
- Tess Slesinger – author/screenwriter
- Alan B. Slifka – investor and philanthropist; founder of Big Apple Circus
- Jay Smooth – radio host and cultural commentator
- Donald J. Sobol – author of juvenile short stories; creator of Encyclopedia Brown
- Stephen Sondheim – composer; attended the Fieldston Lower School
- Dan Squadron – New York state senator
- Andy Stein – musician
- Stewart Stern – screenwriter
- Paul Strand – photographer and filmmaker
- A. G. Sulzberger – chairman of The New York Times Company; publisher of The New York Times
- James Toback – filmmaker
- Richard Tofel – journalist, attorney, administrator, nonfiction writer
- Doris Ulmann – photographer of Appalachia
- Laurence Urdang – lexicographer, dictionary editor
- Helen Valentine – founder of Seventeen magazine
- Elliot Villar – actor
- Andrew Weisblum – Oscar-nominated film editor
- Andrew Weissmann – attorney and professor
- Michael Wertheimer – psychologist and professor
- Chris Wink – performance artist; co-founder, Blue Man Group
- Howard Wolfson – deputy mayor of New York City
- Jane C. Wright – oncologist
- Keith L. T. Wright – New York State Assemblyman
- Sheryl WuDunn – investment banker, Pulitzer Prize-winning journalist
- Adam Yarmolinsky – academic and author who served in the Kennedy, Johnson and Carter administrations
- Eli Zabar – New York City restaurateur
- Lynn Zelevansky – museum curator
