= Broun =

Broun is a surname. It is the Middle English and Scots spelling of Brown. Notable people with the surname include:

- Agnes Broun (1732–1820), mother of Scottish poet Robert Burns
- Alex Broun (born 1965), Australian playwright and screenwriter
- Dauvit Broun (born 1961), Scottish historian
- Elizabeth Broun (born 1946), American museum director
- Frank Broun (1876–1930), Australian politician
- Heywood Broun (1888–1939), American journalist
- Heywood Hale Broun (1918–2001), American journalist, son of Heywood Broun
- Hob Broun (1950–1987), American author
- Jeremy Broun, British furniture designer and maker, writer, film maker and musician
- John Allan Broun (1817–1879), Scottish scientist who worked on magnetism in India
- Jorge Broun (born 1986), Argentine professional footballer
- Maurice Broun (1906–1979), American ornithologist and naturalist
- Paul Broun (born 1946), US Congressman from Georgia
- Peter Broun (1797–1846), first Colonial Secretary of Western Australia
- Thomas Broun (1838–1919), New Zealand soldier, farmer, teacher and entomologist
- William Leroy Broun (1827–1902), President of the Alabama Polytechnic Institute

== See also ==
- Broun Baronets, descendants of Sir Patrick Broun, 1st Baronet, of Colstoun (c. 1630–1688)
- Clan Broun, Scottish clan name
