= Hob Broun =

American novelist

- Born: Heywood Orren Broun; 1950
- Died: December 16, 1987 (aged 37)
- Education: Reed College
- Occupation: Author
- Writing career
- Genres: Short story, novel
- Notable work: Inner Tube

Hob Broun (born Heywood Orren Broun; 1950 – December 16, 1987) was an American author who lived in Portland, Oregon.

Broun was born in Manhattan and graduated from the Dalton School. He attended Reed College in Portland. He was the son of Heywood Hale Broun, the writer and broadcaster, and the grandson of Ruth Hale, a freelance writer and founder of the Lucy Stone League, and Heywood Broun, the newspaper columnist.

Following the publication of his first novel, Odditorium, Broun required spinal surgery to remove a tumor. The surgery saved his life, but he became paralyzed. Subsequently, he wrote two books by blowing air through a tube that activated the specially outfitted keyboard of a computer. Using this technology, he completed a second novel, Inner Tube, and wrote the short stories contained in a posthumously published collection entitled Cardinal Numbers, which won an Oregon Book Award in 1989.

He was working on a third novel when he died of asphyxiation after his respirator broke down in his home in Portland, Oregon. He was thirty-seven years old.
