= Ruth Hale (feminist) =

American journalist and women's rights activist (1887–1934)

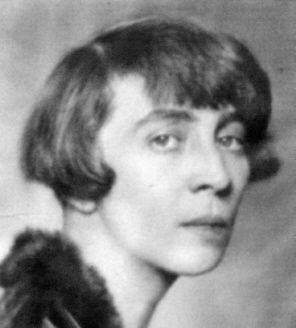
- Born: July 5, 1886; Rogersville, Tennessee, U.S.
- Died: September 18, 1934 (aged 47); New York City, U.S.
- Spouse: Heywood Broun (m. 1917; div. 1933)
- Children: Heywood Hale Broun

Ruth Hale (July 5, 1886 – September 18, 1934) was an American journalist who worked for women's rights in New York City during the era before and after World War I. She was married to journalist Heywood Broun and was an associate of the Algonquin Round Table.

Hale was the founder of the Lucy Stone League. Its motto is "A wife should no more take her husband's name than he should hers. My name is my identity and must not be lost." Hale's beliefs led her to fight for women to be able to legally preserve their names after marriage. She challenged in the courts any government edict that would not recognize a married woman by the name she chose to use.

== Early life ==
Hale was born in Rogersville, Tennessee in 1886. Her younger brother, Richard Hale, also born in the town, later became a singer and then a longtime Hollywood character actor. At age 13, she entered the Hollins Institute (today Hollins University) in Roanoke, Virginia. Three years later, she left to attend Drexel Academy of Fine Art (today Drexel University) in Philadelphia, where she studied painting and sculpture, but writing was her true calling.

== Career in journalism ==
When Hale was 18, she became a journalist in Washington, DC, writing for the Hearst syndicate. She was a sought-after writer and socialite, and attended parties at the White House when President Woodrow Wilson was in office. She worked at the Washington Post until she went back to Philadelphia to become drama critic for the Philadelphia Public Ledger. Hale also dabbled in sports writing, which was uncommon for women to do at the time.

Hale moved to New York City about 1915 and became a feature writer for The New York Times, Vogue and Vanity Fair. Hale also did a bit of acting, appearing on Broadway three times in her life.

== Marriage and family ==
Hale was introduced to Heywood Broun, a popular newspaper columnist and sportswriter, at a New York Giants baseball game at the Polo Grounds. They were married on 6 June 1917. When Broun was sent to France to report on the war, Hale went with him, writing for the Paris edition of the Chicago Tribune.

In 1918, Hale gave birth to her only child, Heywood Hale Broun, in New York City.

== Women's rights and other activism ==
Early in 1921, Hale took a stand with the U.S. State Department, demanding that she be issued a passport as "Ruth Hale", not as "Mrs. Heywood Broun". The government refused; no woman had been given a passport with her birth name to that time. She was unable to cut through the red tape, and the government issued her passport reading "Ruth Hale, also known as Mrs. Heywood Broun." She refused to accept the passport, and cancelled her trip to France, as did her husband.

In May 1921, Hale was believed to be the first married woman to be issued a real estate deed in her own name for an apartment house on Manhattan’s Upper West Side. Not long afterward, she was chosen to be president of the Lucy Stone League, a group she founded based on Lucy Stone's decision to keep her birth name after marriage. The group also chose Rose Falls Bres to serve as its legal counsel. Mrs. Bres, soon to be named president of the National Association of Women Lawyers, had been Hale's lawyer during her battle with the State Department. Heywood Broun was among the men present, and supported his wife in her endeavors. Other Lucy Stoners were Jane Grant, wife of Harold Ross, the co-founder of The New Yorker, and Beatrice Kaufman, wife of playwright George S. Kaufman.

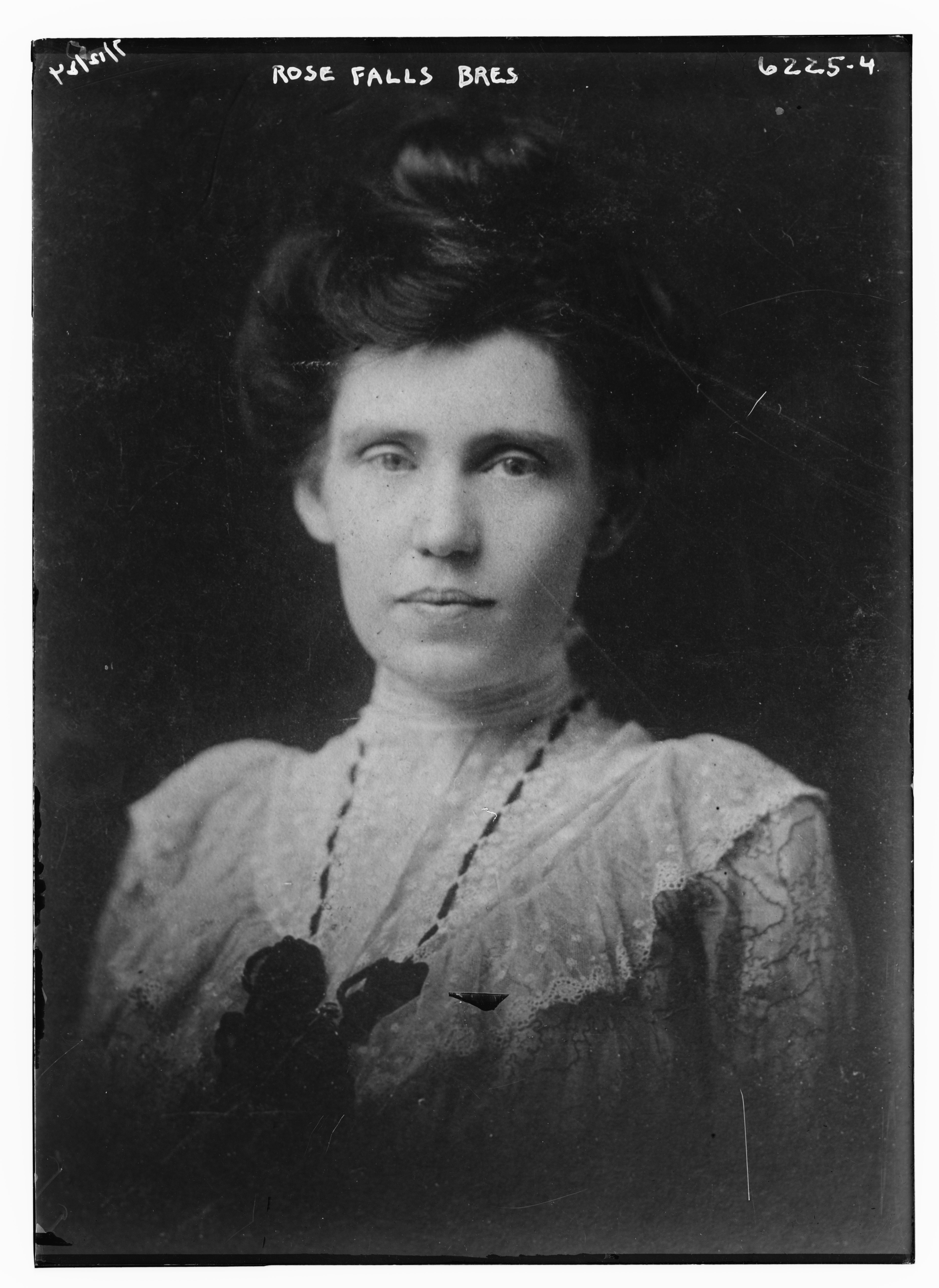
Rose Falls Bres in 1924

Hale and Broun bought a farm in Stamford, Connecticut, but resided in separate homes. She started to spend more time on women’s rights causes and less time on journalism.

In August 1927, Hale took a leading role in protesting the executions of anarchists and accused murderers Sacco and Vanzetti. She traveled to Boston as part of the defense committee, along with Dorothy Parker and John Dos Passos, but Sacco and Vanzetti were executed in spite of the fierce protests of the group. As well, Hale and Parker were arrested. Still, the campaign had a galvanizing effect on Hale, leading her to fight against capital punishment.

In 1929 Edward Bernays decided to pay women to smoke their “torches of freedom” as they walked in the Easter Sunday Parade in New York. This was a shock because until that time, women were only permitted to smoke in certain places such as in the privacy of their own homes. He was very careful when picking women to march because “while they should be good looking, they should not look too model-y,” and he hired his own photographers to make sure that good pictures were taken and then published around the world. Hale called for women to join in the march saying, “Women! Light another torch of freedom! Fight another sex taboo!” Once the footage was released, the campaign was being talked about everywhere, and the women's walk was seen as a protest for equality and sparked discussion throughout the nation and is still known today.

An unintended consequence of the walk was to expose women to tobacco advertising, which led to higher rates of smoking among women. In 1923 women only purchased 5% of cigarettes sold; in 1929 that percentage increased to 12%, in 1935 to 18.1%, peaking in 1965 at 33.3%, and remaining at this level until 1977.

== Later life and death ==
While Hale was intelligent, fearless, and honest, some were frustrated throughout her life by her extremely earnest, often hectoring style. The writer and lawyer Newman Levy, a longtime friend of Hale and Broun, recalled a bitter exchange between Hale and an unidentified person. Adversary: "The trouble with you, Ruth, is that you have no sense of humor." Hale: "Thank God I am not cursed with the albatross of a sense of humor."

During the 1920s and 1930s, Hale continued to write, reviewed books for the Brooklyn Eagle, and worked as a theatrical press agent. She was a leading figure in New York’s writer’s community, and, with her husband, she was an associate of the Algonquin Round Table at the Algonquin Hotel.

By 1931 Hale, who believed that a woman is "through after forty," became depressed.

Hale and Broun were quietly divorced in Mexico in November 1933, although the two remained close and continued to reside on the same property in Connecticut.

Ten months later, in September 1934, Hale came down with an intestinal fever at her home in Stamford. Broun rushed his former wife to Doctor's Hospital on the Upper East Side of Manhattan, but it was too late. She died on September 18 at age 47. She was buried in her hometown of Rogersville, Tennessee.

== Film portrayal ==
Hale was portrayed by the actress Jane Adams in the 1994 film Mrs. Parker and the Vicious Circle.
