= Henry Street Settlement =

Social service agency in New York City

- Henry Street Settlement and Neighborhood Playhouse
- U.S. National Register of Historic Places
- U.S. National Historic Landmark
- U.S. Historic district – Contributing property
- New York State Register of Historic Places
- New York City Landmark
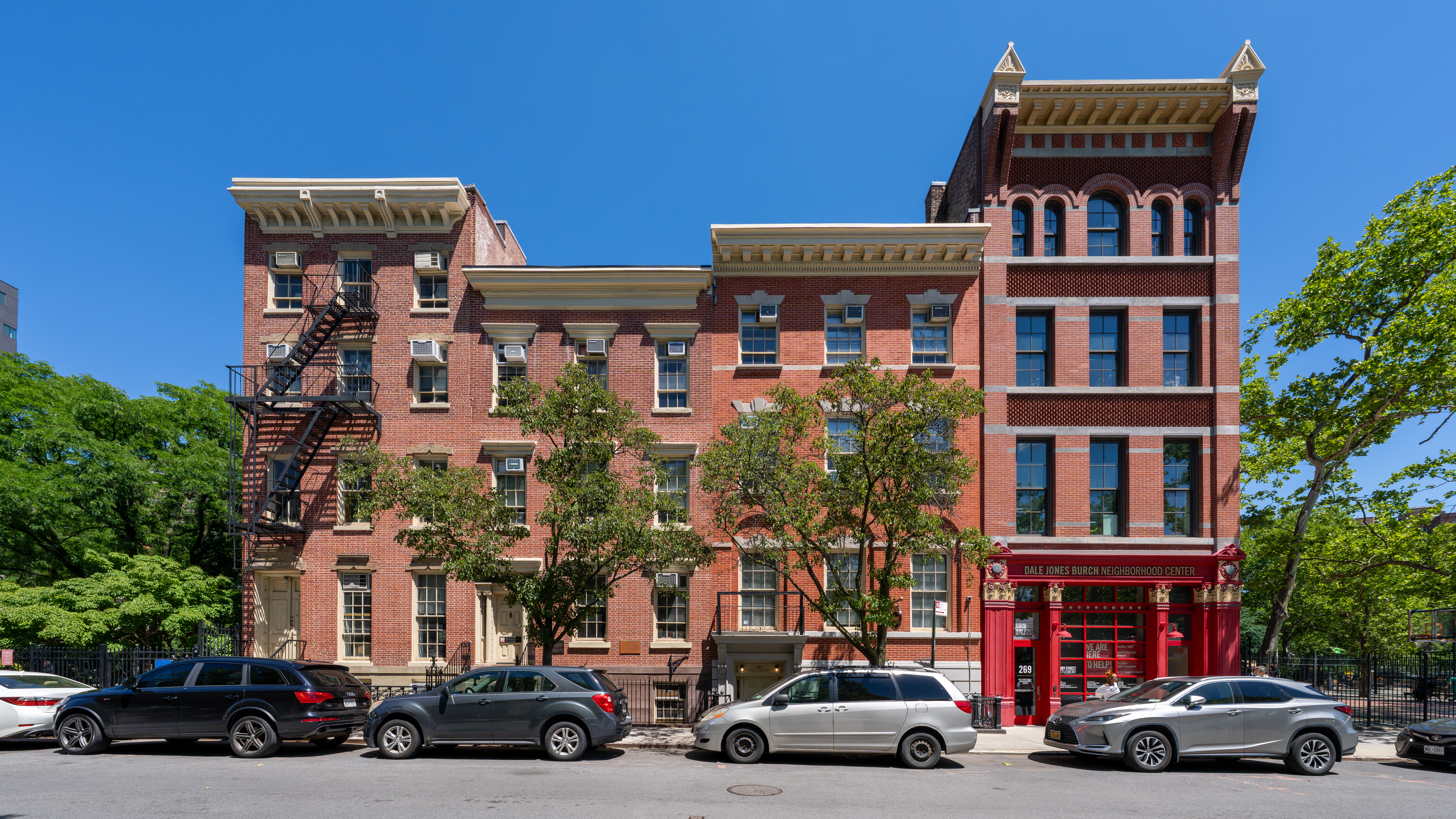
- (2026)

- Location within Lower Manhattan
- Location: 263–267 Henry St., and 466 Grand Street; Manhattan, New York, U.S.
- Coordinates: 40°42′50″N 73°59′7″W
- Area: 1 acre (0.40 ha)
- Built: 1827
- Architect: 267: Buchman & Fox
- Architectural style: Federal, Greek Revival, Colonial Revival
- Website: henrystreet.org
- Part of: Lower East Side Historic District (ID00001015)
- NRHP reference No.: 74001272
- NYSRHP No.: 06101.011800 (263 Henry Street); 06101.003320 (265 Henry Street); 06101.003321 (267 Henry Street); 06101.003322 (Neighborhood Playhouse)
- NYCL No.: 0095 (263 Henry Street); 0096 (265 Henry Street); 0097 (267 Henry Street); 2433 (Neighborhood Playhouse)

Significant dates
- Added to NRHP: May 30, 1974 (263, 265, and 267 Henry Street and 466 Grand Street); February 11, 2022 (redesignation of 265 and 267 Henry Street)
- Designated NHL: May 30, 1974
- Designated NYSRHP: June 23, 1980
- Designated NYCL: January 18, 1966 (263, 265, and 267 Henry Street); March 22, 2011 (Neighborhood Playhouse)

The Henry Street Settlement is a not-for-profit social service agency on the Lower East Side of Manhattan, New York City that provides social services, arts programs and health care services to New Yorkers of all ages. It was founded under the name Nurses' Settlement in 1893 by progressive reformer and nurse Lillian Wald.

== Description ==
The Settlement serves about 50,000 people each year. Clients include low-income individuals and families, survivors of domestic violence, youth ages 2 through 21, individuals with mental and physical health challenges, senior citizens, and arts and culture enthusiasts who attend performances, classes and exhibitions at Henry Street's Abrons Arts Center.

The Settlement's administrative offices are still located in its original (c. 1832) federal row houses at 263, 265 and 267 Henry Street in Manhattan. Services are offered at 17 program sites throughout the area, many of them located in buildings operated by the New York City Housing Authority.

The Settlement's buildings at 263, 265 and 267 Henry Street became New York City designated landmarks in 1966. These buildings, along with the Neighborhood Playhouse building at 466 Grand Street, were collectively added to the National Register of Historic Places (NRHP) in 1974 and designated a National Historic Landmark in 1989. The buildings at 265 and 267 Henry Street were re-added to the NRHP in 2022 under the name Lillian Wald House.

== History ==
=== Founding and early expansion ===
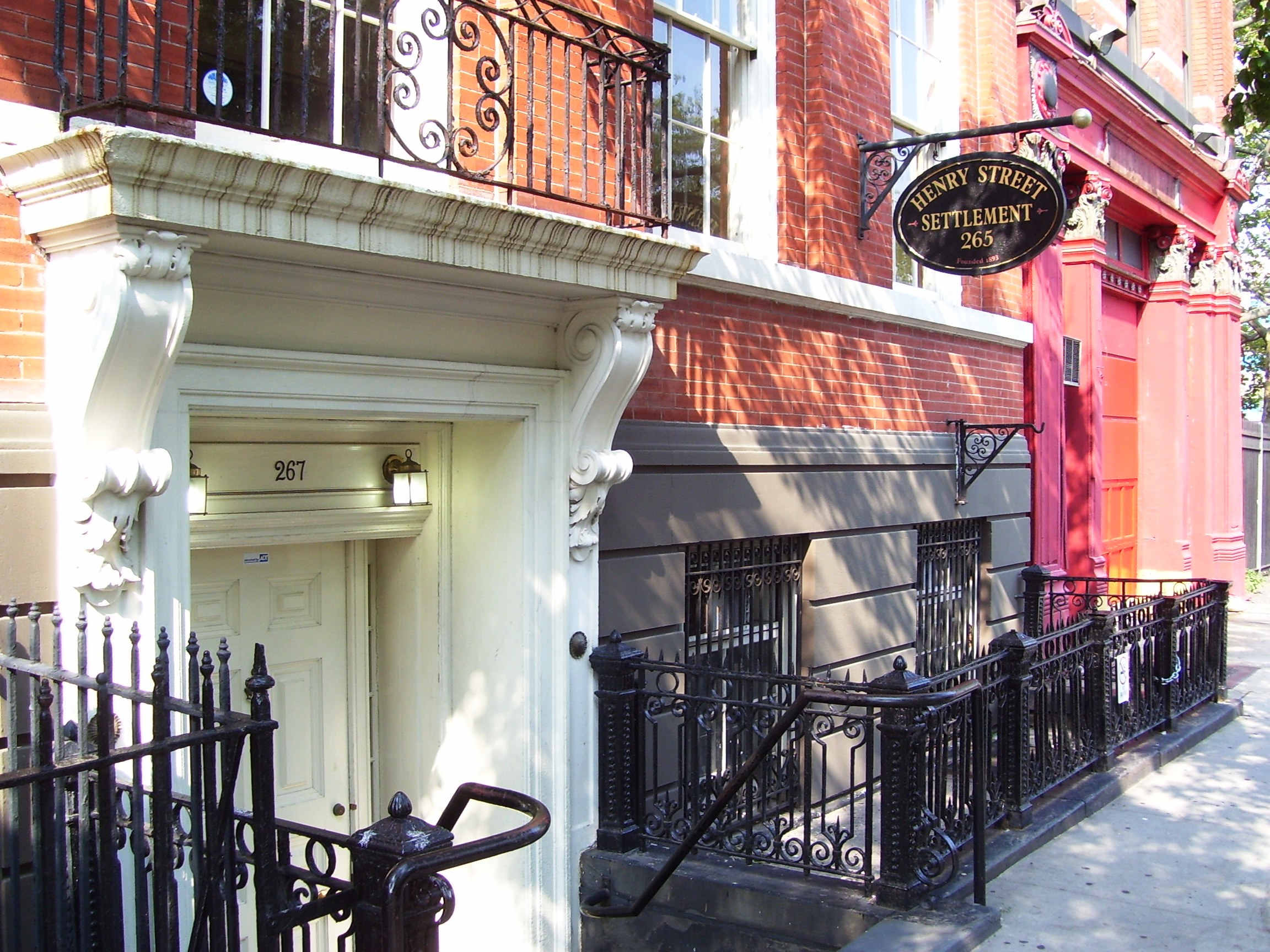
A street-level view of 267 Henry Street

In 1892, Lillian Wald, a 25-year-old nurse then enrolled in the Women's Medical College, volunteered to teach a class on home health care for immigrant women at the Louis Down-Town Sabbath and Daily School on the Lower East Side. One day, she was approached by a young girl who kept repeating "mommy ... baby ... blood". Wald gathered some sheets from her bed-making lesson and followed the child to her home, a cramped two-room tenement apartment. Inside, she found the child's mother who had recently given birth and in need of health care. The doctor tending to her had left because she could not afford to pay him. This was Wald's first experience with poverty; she called the episode her "baptism by fire" and dedicated herself to bringing nursing care, and eventually education and access to the arts, to the immigrant poor on Manhattan's Lower East Side. The next year she founded the Nurses' Settlement, which later changed its name to the Henry Street Settlement. One worker with Wald in the Settlement was Mabel R. Goodlander, who later became a significant figure in progressive education in New York through her work with the Ethical Culture School.

Two years later, in 1895, Jacob Schiff, a banker and philanthropist purchased the Federal style townhouse at 265 Henry Street for the new organization to use. The building was expanded upwards with an additional story to provide more space, and Schiff donated the building to the Settlement in 1903. The year before, the Settlement had added new facilities, including a gymnasium at 299, 301 and 303 Henry Street.

The organization expanded again in 1906, when Morris Loeb bought the building at 267 Henry Street for it to use. This Greek Revival townhouse was purchased from the Hebrew Technical School for Girls, which had previously employed the architectural firm of Buchman & Fox in 1900 to redo the facade in Colonial Revival style. Alice P. Gannett served as Associate headworker in 1912.

=== 20th century ===
In 1915, the Neighborhood Playhouse, one of the first "Little Theatres", was created by the sisters Alice and Irene Lewisohn at the corner of Grand and Pitt Streets, offering classical drama for the people of the area. The theater still operates, as the Harry De Jur Playhouse.

In 1927, the Henry Street Music School began operation. It had its formal opening in November 1928. Early supporters of this addition to the settlement included Aaron Copland and Walter Damrosch. In 1937, the school premiered the play-opera The Second Hurricane, which featured music by Copland, libretto by Edwin Denby, direction by Orson Welles, and orchestral conduction by Lehman Engel. The director at the time, Grace Spofford, initially suggested the idea of a play-opera for school performers, and was largely responsible for bringing the production together. Alumni of the music school include violinists Berl Senofsky, Stuart Canin, Isidor Lateiner, and Helen Kwalwasser (who later became a faculty member); pianists Martin Canin and Jacob Lateiner; and singer Billie Lynn Daniel. Faculty have included violinist Ivan Galamian, pianist Isabelle Vengerova, bassoonist Stephen Maxym, conductor Arnold Gamson, and composers Paul Creston, Roy Harris, and Robert Starer.

The Settlement began leasing the townhouse at 263 Henry Street, on the other side of its original building, in 1938, using it for classrooms and residences, and in 1949 it purchased the building, which was originally built in the Federal style but had been extensively altered. This combining of the three townhouse – 263, 265 and 267 – had the consequence of preserving part of the 1820s streetscape amid what later became a crowded tenement district. The block of Henry Street between Montgomery Street and Grand Street, which also includes St. Augustine's Church, gives an impression of uptown Manhattan as it would have looked in the 1820s and 1830s. #263 Henry Street was restored in 1989 and #265 in 1992.

Henry Street is known for its pioneering efforts in social service and health care delivery. Its innovations included the establishment of one of New York City's first off-street playgrounds (1902); funding the first public school nurse (1902); starting the Visiting Nurse Service, which became independent as the Visiting Nurse Service of New York in 1944; opening one of the nation's first mental health clinics (1946), one of the first transitional housing facilities for the homeless (1972), the first Naturally Occurring Retirement Community (NORC) in public housing (1994) and the city's first Safe Haven shelter for homeless women (2007).

=== 21st century ===
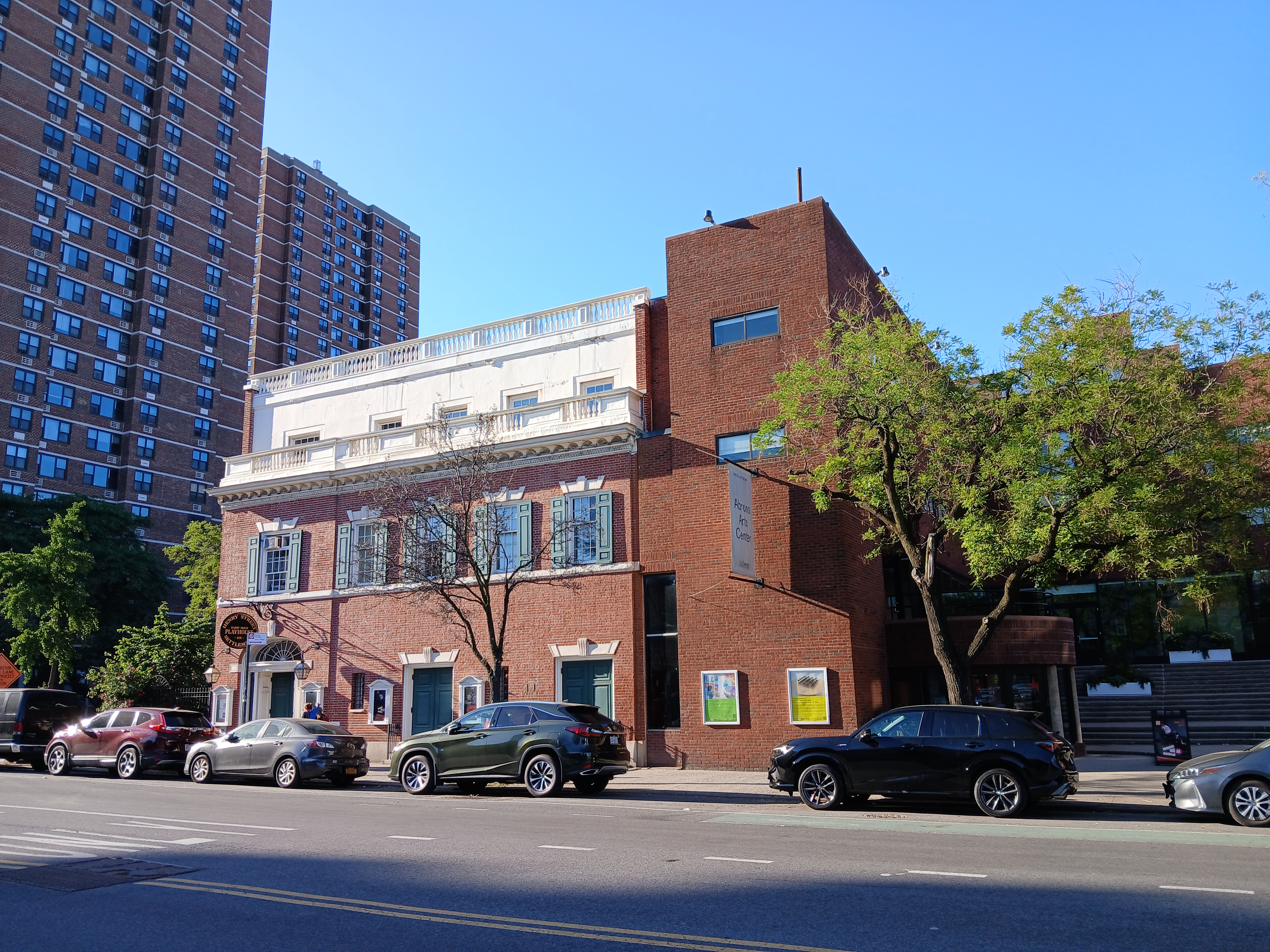
The Neighborhood Playhouse building on Grand Street

In 2018, Sylvia Bloom, a secretary at Cleary Gottlieb Steen & Hamilton for 67 years, donated $6.24 million to the settlement's Expanded Horizons College Success Program, which helps disadvantaged students prepare for and complete college.

In honor of Henry Street's 125th anniversary, American artist, KAWS, collaborated with the Settlement to hold an interactive workshop for art students from the Lower East Side community.

At his death, actor and comedian Jerry Stiller bequeathed an undisclosed sum to Henry Street Settlement's Abrons Arts Center and Boys & Girls Republic, community programs that aid in the educational and artistic development of Lower East Side youth.

In 2021, the New York State Historic Preservation Office approved Henry Street Settlement's headquarters at 265–267 Henry Street as an LGBT historic site. The designation is founded upon Lillian Wald's romantic and platonic relationships with the women she affectionately called "The Family" (a concept commonly used in women-run settlement houses), who provided an essential support network for her from the 1890s until her retirement in the 1930s.

== Services ==
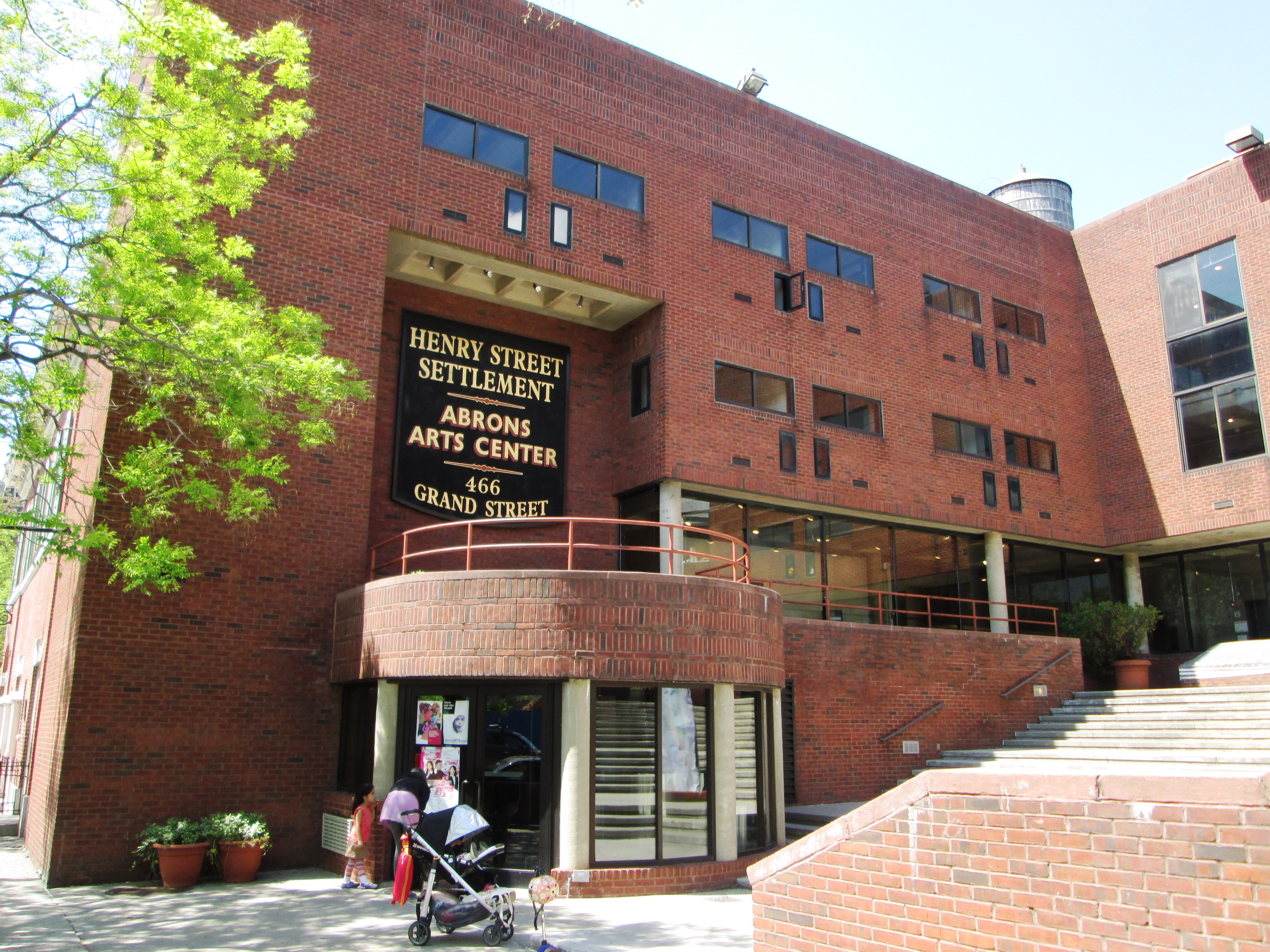
Abrons Arts Center

Henry Street Settlement offers:

- Housing – Four homeless shelters, including one for domestic violence survivors, and supportive permanent housing for formerly homeless individuals with mental health issues.
- Senior Programs – a Naturally Occurring Retirement Community, the Good Companions Senior Center, a Senior Companion Program and a Meals-on-Wheels program.
- Youth Programs – Day care centers, after-school services, college prep programs, youth employment, GED classes, sports and recreation programs, a peer HIV prevention program, and summer day camp.
- Workforce Development Center – Job training and placement, customized staffing services.
- Health and Wellness Services – State-licensed mental and primary care clinics, psychological counseling, continuing day treatment program, a parent center, HIV family services, and home housekeeping services.
- Neighborhood Resource Center – A walk-in facility for benefits screening, legal counseling and access to affordable health insurance.
- Abrons Arts Center – Located at 466 Grand Street, the Abrons Arts Center offers arts instruction (dance, music, visual arts and theater) at affordable prices to children and adults and offers performances in three theaters, including the playhouse (circa 1915). It also has visual arts exhibitions, artist-in-residence workspaces, an arts-in-education program, and two summer camps (arts and architecture).

== In literature ==
- The House on Henry Street by Lillian Wald
- The House on Henry Street: The Enduring Life of a Lower East Side Settlement, by Ellen Snyder-Grenier
- Sue Barton, Visiting Nurse, by Helen Dore Boylston

== See also ==
- List of New York City Designated Landmarks in Manhattan below 14th Street
- National Register of Historic Places listings in Manhattan below 14th Street
- National Historic Landmarks in New York City
