= Hebrew Technical School for Girls =

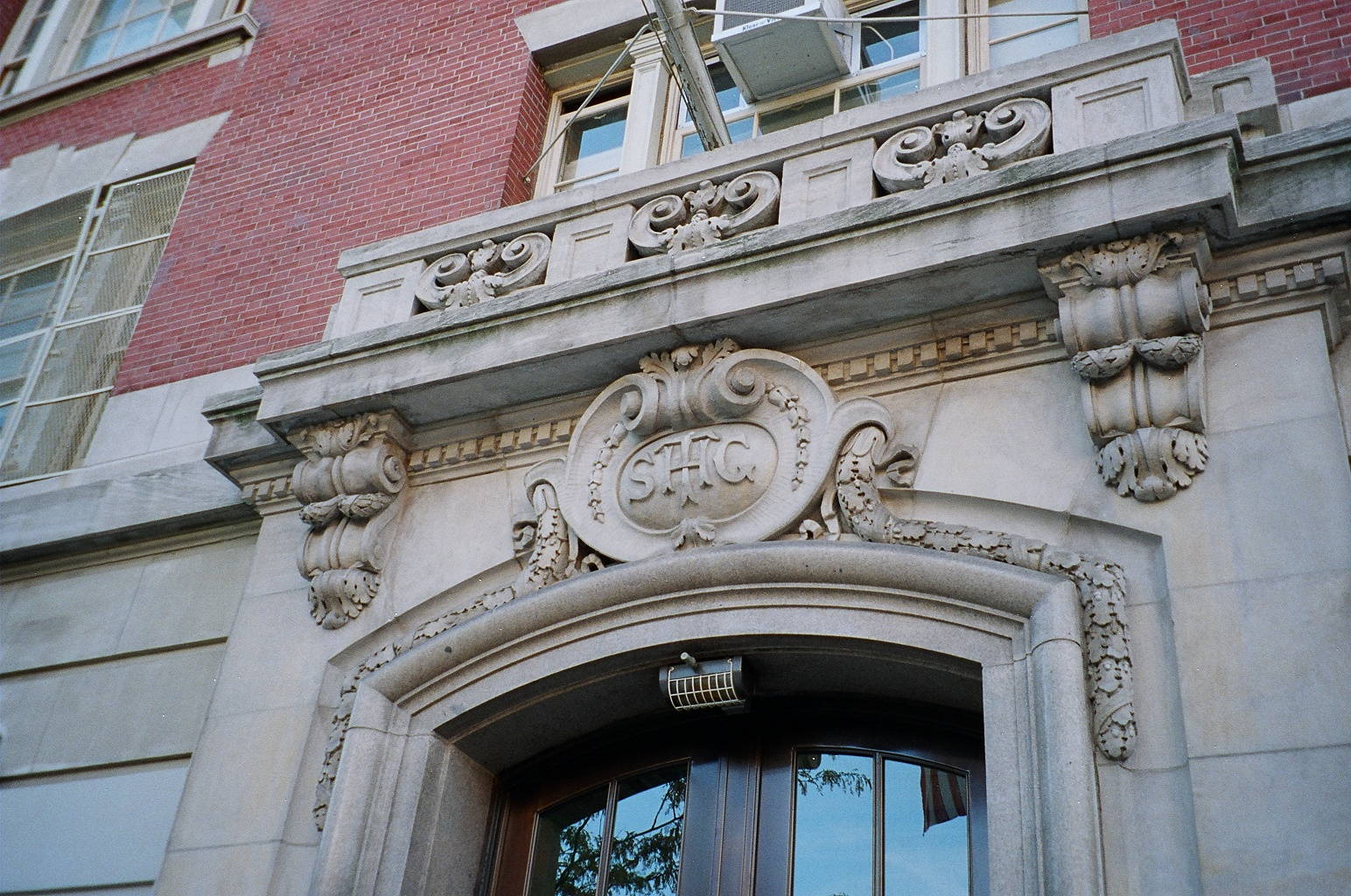
Initials above the door of the HSTC's former building on 2nd Avenue and 15th Street in New York

The Hebrew Technical School for Girls was a vocational school whose goal was to provide free instruction for women to pursue jobs in commercial and industrial sectors. It was founded in 1880 as the Louis Down-Town Sabbath and Day School by the educator Minnie Dessau Louis (1841-1922). It was founded with the assistance of Temple Emanu-el for "the express purpose of elevating working-class Jewish immigrant girls." Their building was located at 240 Second Avenue in Manhattan, New York City.

The school had two divisions. The Commercial Department provided courses in stenography, typewriting, bookkeeping, English, penmanship, commercial arithmetic and geography. The Manual Department, intended for those going into millinery or dressmaking, offered courses in sewing, millinery, embroidery, drawing and costume design.

In 1892, Lillian Wald, a 25-year-old nurse then enrolled in the Women’s Medical College, volunteered to teach a class on home health care for immigrant women at the Louis Down-Town Sabbath and Daily School. Because of her encounters there, she eventually founded the Nurses' Settlement, which eventually became the Henry Street Settlement.

The school closed in 1932, as New York City public schools began to offer similar courses. The charity renamed itself the Jewish Foundation for Education of Women, and provided grants for undergraduate and graduate study. The building now houses the Manhattan Comprehensive Night and Day School.
