= Mabel R. Goodlander =

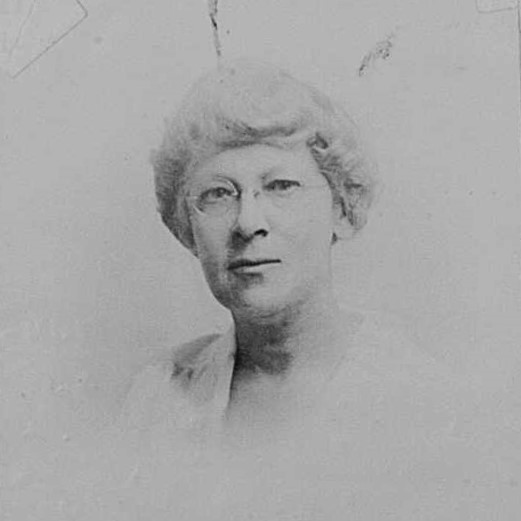
- Born: March 1, 18691 March 1869 – 25 February 1944; Rockford, Illinois
- Died: February 25, 1944 (aged 74); Rockford, Illinois
- Occupations: Teacher, school principal, writer
- Employer: Ethical Culture School, New York
- Movement: Ethical Culture

Mabel Ray Goodlander (1 March 1869 – 25 February 1944) was an American educator, writer, and a "leader in progressive education" in the city of New York through her long career with the Ethical Culture School.

== Early life and education ==
Mabel Ray Goodlander was born in Rockford, Illinois.

Goodlander studied at Bradford Academy, Massachusetts, and at Rockford College. She did graduate work under John Dewey at the University of Chicago, and obtained her B.S. from the Teachers College at Columbia University.

== Teaching and Ethical Culture ==
Goodlander was a student of Felix Adler, founder of the Ethical Culture movement. She ultimately spent 33 years working for the schools of the New York Society for Ethical Culture.

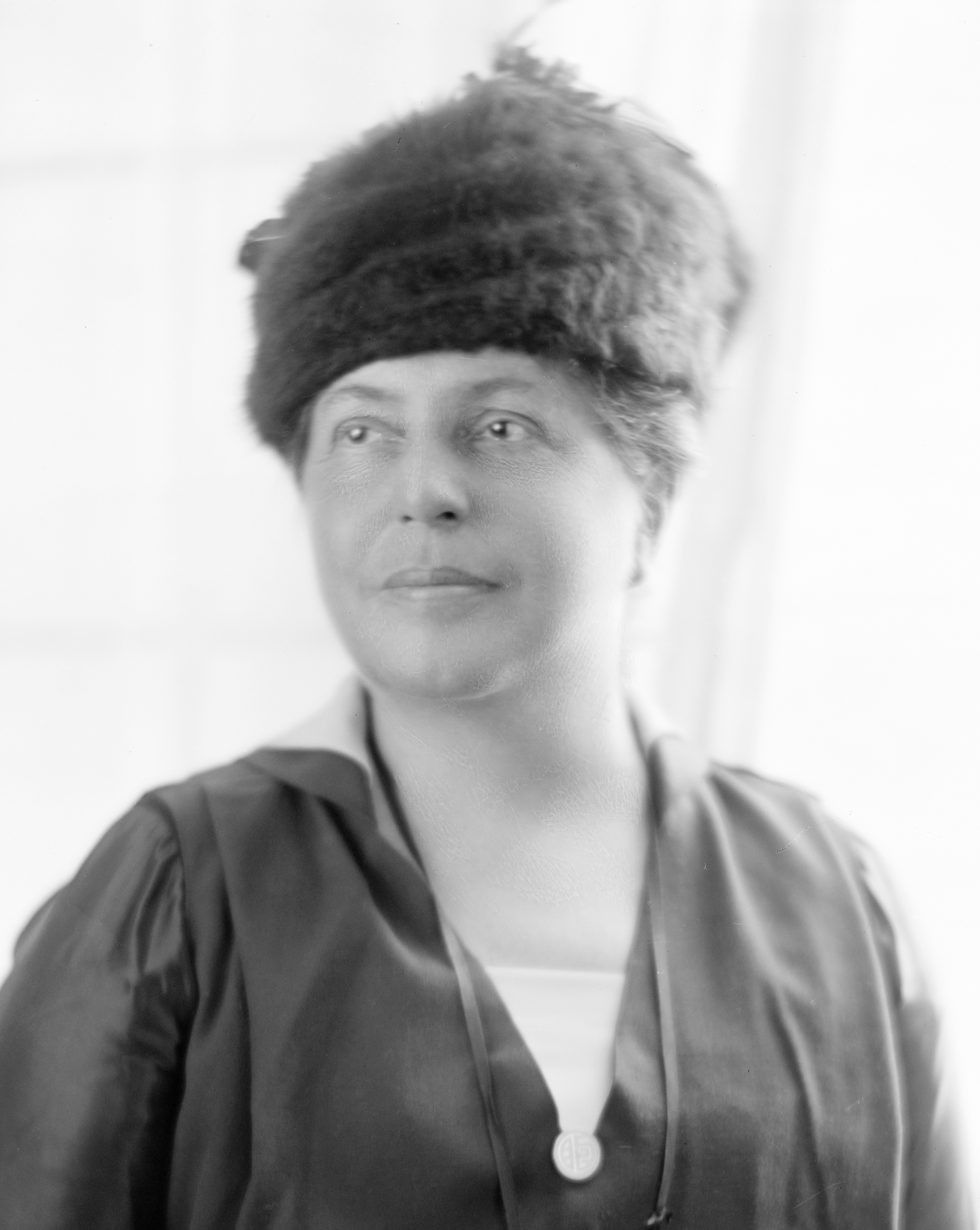
Lillian Wald, a friend and colleague of Goodlander

Goodlander's first teaching position was at the Henry Street Settlement, working in the kindergarten. There, she was a close friend of the settlement's founder, Lillian Wald. She left to take up graduate study under Dewey at the University of Chicago.

In 1903, she became associated with the Ethical Culture schools, and from 1918 to 1924 oversaw an "Experimental Class". The object of this was described in a preface to Goodlander's book Education Through Experience as being

to try to work out in class room practice the more recent theories of elementary education under normal conditions, as to number of pupils, class room space, and teaching force.

Goodlander herself wrote:

Doctor Adler has set the aim of our school as that of education for leadership in a democracy, and has emphasized the necessity of the fullest development of the individual, in order that each may render the greatest possible service to society. Looking forward to this end in education, we have endeavored in this class to create a free social environment, where children, in co-operation with others of their own age, may make a beginning in democratic living, under conditions more like life outside of school than those which have commonly been considered appropriate for the school regime.

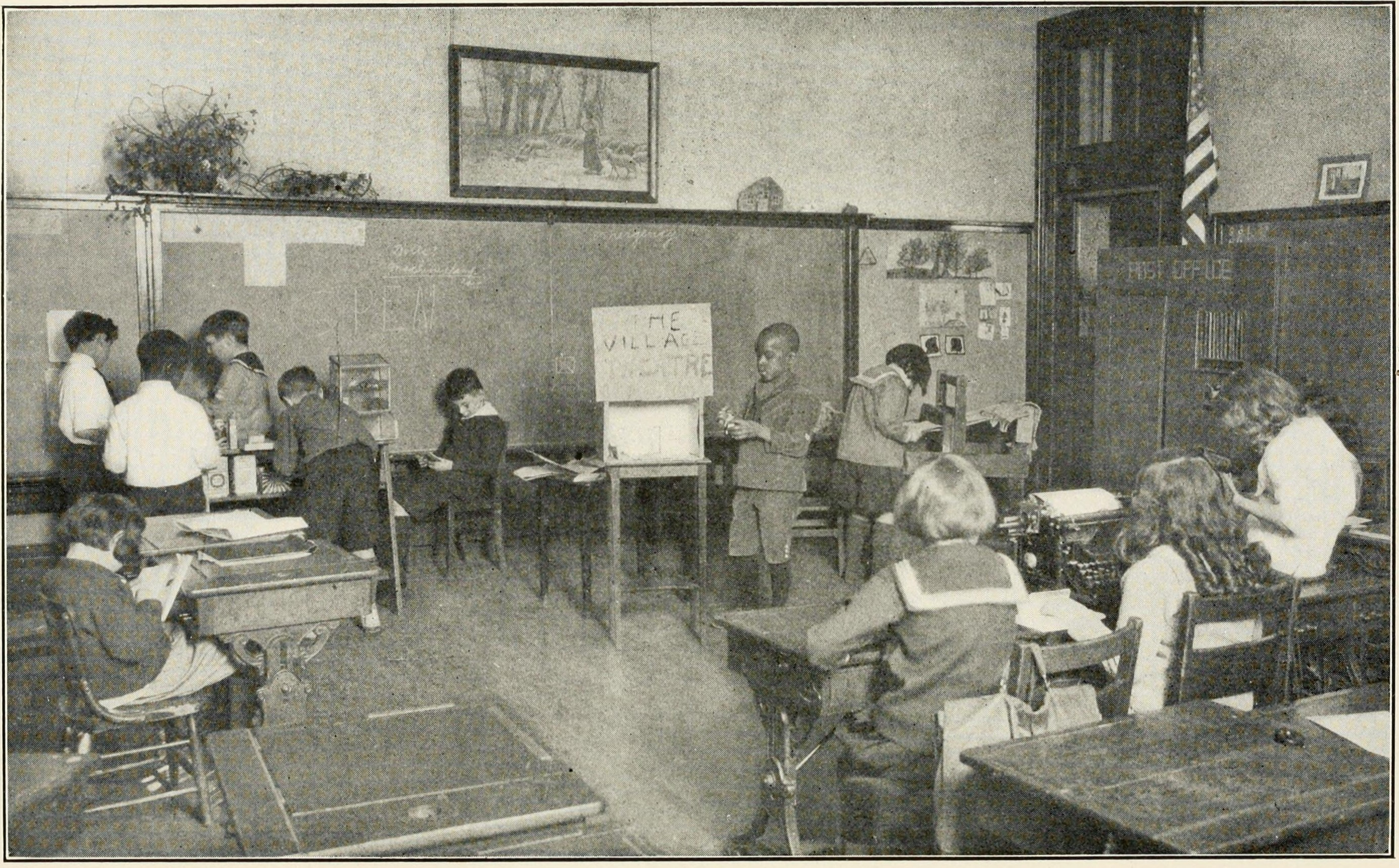
Self-elected Work and Play in the Class Room from Education Through Experience (1921)

The experiment led to the foundation of a branch elementary school of the Ethical Culture schools, of which Goodlander was principal from 1924 to 1932. From 1932 to 1935 she was principal of its successor, the Fieldston Lower School.

Goodlander retired in 1935. A dinner organised by Fieldston's Parents and Teachers Association was attended by 175 colleagues, friends, teachers and pupils. Among the speakers were John Dewey and John Lovejoy Elliott, a leader in the Ethical Culture movement.

In addition to her teaching, Goodlander was the author of a number of books, magazine articles on education, and plays for children.

== Death ==
Goodlander died in Rockford, Illinois, aged 74. An obituary in the New York Times remembered her as a "leader in progressive education" in the city of New York.

== Select bibliography ==
- "Development in the School Grades" in Festivals and Plays in School and Elsewhere by Percival Chubb and his associates in the Ethical Culture School, New York (1912)
- Fairy Plays for Children (1915)
- Education Through Experience: A Four Year Experiment in the Ethical Culture School (1921)
- The First Sixty Years: An Historical Sketch of the Ethical Culture School, 1878–79 to 1938–39 (1939)
