= Beulah Livingstone =

Publicist in the theatrical and motion picture industries

Beulah Livingstone (May 29, 1886 – January 12, 1975) was an American publicist in the theatrical and motion picture industries. In 1926 she was named by the Associated Motion Picture Advertisers as one of the 12 women who had accomplished the most for the motion picture industry; the other 11 women were all actresses or screenwriters.

Beulah Livingstone Frank, daughter of Harry and Lucy Frank, graduated from the Ethical Culture School in 1905. After teaching kindergarten for three years, she began newspaper and magazine work, writing stories, articles and interviews. Using the name Beulah Livingstone, she transitioned into theatrical publicity, doing publicity work for Lou Tellegen, Anna Pavlova, Irene Castle, David Belasco and other theatrical stars and producers.

In 1916 she handled New York publicity for Thomas Ince's motion picture Civilization.

In 1916-1917 she wrote a column for Billboard under various headings including "Broadway in Brief," "Times Square Tattle" and "Gossip of the Fair Sex."

In 1917 she became publicity agent for Olga Petrova. In 1919 she was hired by Joseph Schenck to direct publicity for Norma Talmadge, and her success prompted Schenck to later expand her duties to include publicity for Constance Talmadge, Buster Keaton, Rudolph Valentino, and others.

In 1925 she accompanied Valentino to a New York theater and they had great difficulty leaving due to the large mob of fans. In 1938 she wrote the small book Remember Valentino: Reminiscences of the World's Greatest Lover.

She was vice president of the Lucy Stone League, honorary president of The Woman Pays Club of New York, vice president of the Theatrical Press Representatives of America, and member of the New York Newspaper Women's Club.

Beulah Livingstone died in New York City on January 12, 1975. Her sister, Mabel Livingstone, also worked as a publicist during the silent film era.
