= Swann Galleries =

New York City auction house

Coordinates: 40.74100°N 73.98493°W

Swann Auction Galleries
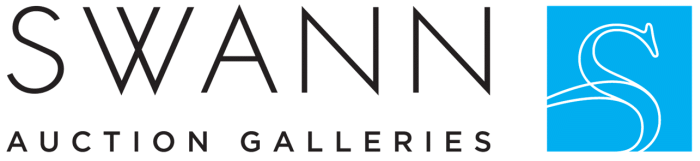

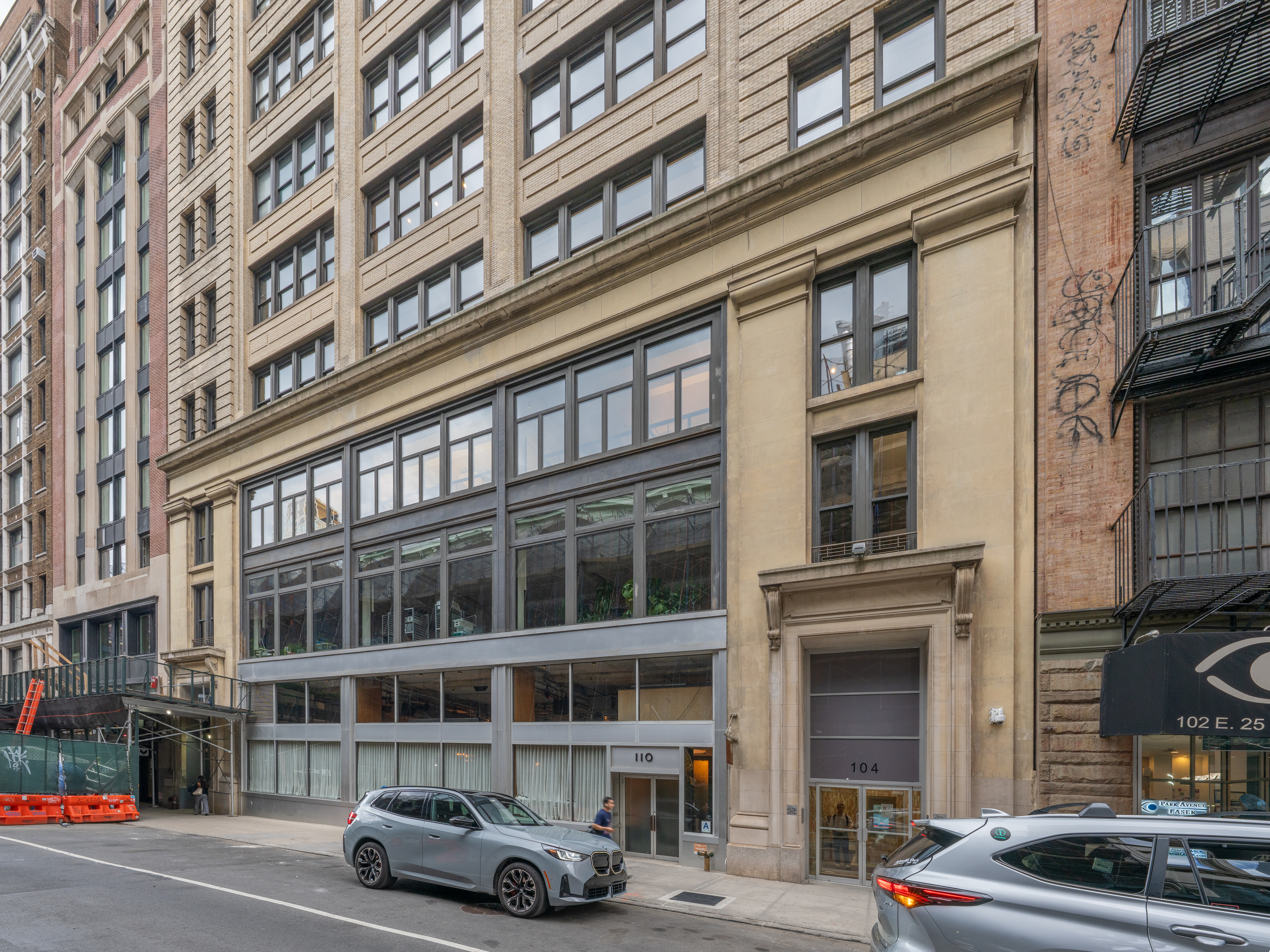
- Industry: Auctioneering
- Founded: New York City, New York, U.S. (1941)
- Founder: Benjamin Swann
- Headquarters: 104 East 25 Street, New York City, New York, U.S.
- Key people: George Lowry, Chairman; Nicholas Lowry, President, Principal Auctioneer
- Products: Rare Books/Fine Art
- Website: swanngalleries.com

Swann Galleries is a New York City auction house founded in 1941. It is a specialist auctioneer of antique and rare works on paper, and it is considered the oldest continually operating New York specialist auction house.

The company has separate specialist departments for books, autographs and manuscripts, maps and atlases, photographs and photographic literature, prints and drawings, vintage posters, illustration art, and African-American fine art. Additionally, Swann conducts annual sales of printed and manuscript African Americana. In total, Swann conducts over 35 catalogued live auctions a year.

== History ==
Book dealer Benjamin Swann founded the family-owned firm in 1941. In 1970, George Lowry acquired the business from Mr. Swann, and it is now headed by Nicholas Lowry, the third generation at the company’s helm.

For over thirty years, Swann has been located on East 25th Street, just one block east of Madison Square Park, at the boundaries of the historic Murray Hill, Gramercy Park, and Flatiron districts.

== Affiliations ==
Swann is one of the founding members of International Auctioneers (IA), formed in 1993 by some of the world’s leading independent auction houses. Current European members are located in Stockholm, Cologne, Milan, Paris, Zurich, Geneva, and Vienna.

Swann is the only auction house that is a member of the Antiquarian Booksellers' Association of America, which actively promotes an ethical professionalism in the dealing and trading of rare books.

Many of the specialists at Swann share their expertise on PBS’ Antiques Roadshow, where they assess people’s antiques and collectibles in the quest for hidden gems.
