= Melinda Beck (illustrator) =

American illustrator

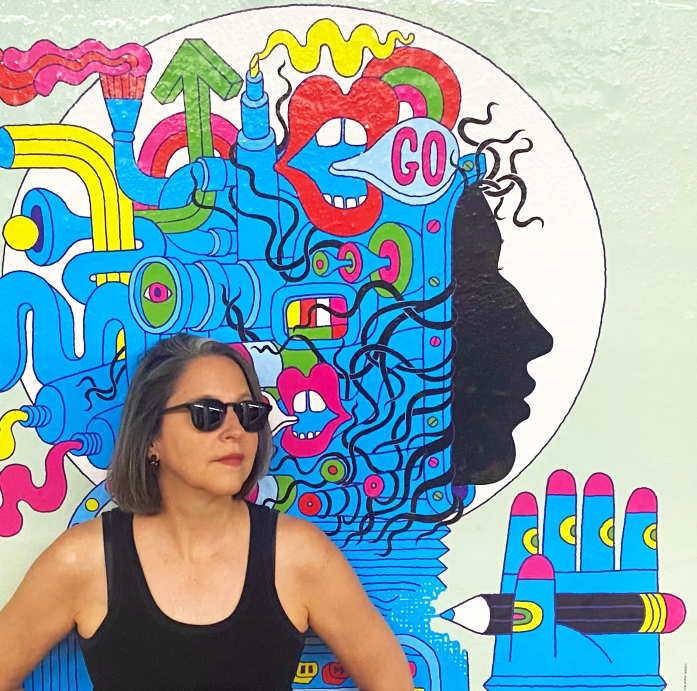
- Born: Melinda Joy Beck
- Education: Rhode Island School of Design
- Website: https://melindabeck.com

Melinda Beck is an Emmy nominated illustrator, animator, and graphic designer.

== Early life and education ==
At the age of twelve, Beck took life drawing courses at the Art Students League of New York. She attended the Ethical Culture Fieldston School in the Bronx (class of 1985), and then studied graphic design at the Rhode Island School of Design, which she graduated from in 1989.

== Career ==
Beck's clients include 2K Games, Athena Health, Chicco baby products, Chronicle Books, GQ, Harper’s Magazine, Hasbro, Neiman Marcus, Netflix, Nickelodeon, Nike, Partnership to End Addiction, ProPublica, Random House, Real Simple magazine, Sesame Workshop, Scholastic, Simon & Schuster, Southern Poverty Law Center, Supreme, Target, The New York Public Library, The New Yorker, The New York Times, Time Magazine, and the United States Postal Service. Her work has also been exhibited in various shows. A series of her prints was acquired by the Library of Congress for their permanent collection. Beck currently teaches poster design at the School of Visual Arts, and has created artwork for the SVA subway poster series, featured at more than a hundred New York City subway stations. In 2022, the United States Post Office issued a collection of stamps designed by Beck to commemorate the 50th anniversary of the passage of Title IX. Beck is featured in "The Illustrator: 100 Best From Around The World" edited by Steven Heller (design writer) and Julius Wiedemann, and published by Taschen. She is based in Brooklyn, New York.

In a June 14, 2009 New York Times article titled, "Use Their Work Free? Some Artists Say No to Google" by Andrew Adam Newman, Beck is mentioned as one of several illustrators who were approached by Google in 2009 to contribute their art for free, and declined the offer as part of what Newman describes as "a tide of indignation toward Google (that) swelled among illustrators"..."who are rankled that Google is asking them to work for exposure alone."

In a July 4, 2021 New York Times architecture review of the Stavros Niarchos Foundation Library (a branch of the New York Public Library) titled, "A Glowing Shrine to the Printed Word," the author James Russell comments, "The rest of the library could use more of the nutty exuberance of murals designed by Melinda Beck."

Matthew Duntemann, who was the executive director of Nickelodeon Parenting and Preschool Group, and a long-term client of Beck's when she did interstitials and drawings for animated shorts for Noggin (brand) remarked, "For NOGGIN, our mantra from the beginning was 'hand of the child, eye of the designer'. Melinda was able to take that mantra and bring it to life. She has been that very important 'eye' for us, having created work that has delighted children, while giving a knowing wink to adults. That's the way we like it. We've been able to create a visual system for NOGGIN that allows for a great deal of diversity within that system. She's brought a really clear voice to this design template, and a unique one too."

The Library of Congress houses a giclée print by Beck titled "Hate Speech" of which they commented, "With searing, visually layered imagery, Melinda Beck delivers a strong, anti-hate message in this illustration. Bending her style to expressive effect, Beck riddles the central silhouetted profile head with holes and incorporates an ominously red snake and mouth with rodent-like teeth. Far from benign, the botanical border consists of thorns, insects and other signifiers of decay and destruction. Often combining digital and hand-drawn imagery, Beck creates illustrations for magazines, books, cover designs, posters, and animations."

== Awards and honors ==
- Society of Illustrators
- American Illustration
- Communication Arts
- AIGA
- Broadcast Design Award
- 3X3
