= Lucy Stone League =

American women's rights organization

The Lucy Stone League is a women's rights organization founded in 1921. Its motto is "A wife should no more take her husband's name than he should hers. My name is my identity and must not be lost." It was the first group to fight for women to be allowed to keep their maiden name after marriage—and to use it legally.

It was among the first feminist groups to arise from the suffrage movement and gained attention for seeking and preserving women's own-name rights, such as the particular ones which follow in this article.

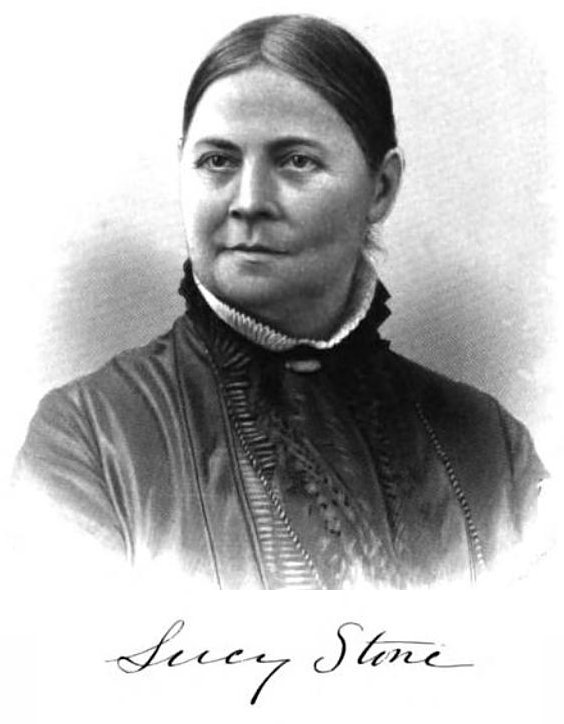
Portrait and signature of Lucy Stone, as published in 1881 in History of Woman Suffrage, Volume II

The group took its name from Lucy Stone (1818–1893), the first married woman in the United States to carry her birth name through life (she married in 1855). The New York Times called the group the "Maiden Namers". They held their first meetings, debates, and functions at the Hotel Pennsylvania in New York City, including the founding meeting on 17 May 1921.

The founder of the Lucy Stone League was Ruth Hale, a New York City journalist and critic. The wife of New York World columnist Heywood Broun, Ruth Hale challenged in federal court any government edict that would not recognize a married woman (such as herself) by the name she chose to use. The only one in her household called Mrs. Heywood Broun was the cat.

The League became so well known that a new term, Lucy Stoner, came into common use, meaning anyone who advocates that a wife be allowed to keep and use her own name. This term was eventually included in dictionaries. Women who choose not to use their husbands' surnames have also been called Lucy Stoners.

== Members ==
The group was open to women and men. Some early members were, in alphabetical order:

- Franklin Pierce Adams, columnist
- Heywood Broun, columnist
- Janet Flanner, Paris correspondent for The New Yorker
- Zona Gale, Wisconsin-based author and playwright, first woman to win the Pulitzer Prize for drama, and political-campaigner for women's rights
- Jane Grant, New York Times reporter, wife of Harold Ross (founder of The New Yorker), and cofounder of The New Yorker
- Ruth Hale, journalist and publicist
- Fannie Hurst, author
- Beulah Livingstone, silent movie publicist
- Anita Loos, playwright-author
- Neysa McMein, illustrator
- Solita Solano, drama critic, editor, and writer
- Sophie Treadwell, playwright, journalist

Some of the members often attended the Algonquin Round Table. Since many League members wrote for a living, they could and did write frequently about the group in New York City newspapers.

There were many well-known women who were Lucy Stoners and kept their names after marriage but were not known to be League members, such as (listed alphabetically) Isadora Duncan (dancer), Amelia Earhart (aviation celebrity), Margaret Mead (anthropologist), Edna St. Vincent Millay (poet), Georgia O'Keeffe (artist), Frances Perkins (first woman appointed to any U.S. cabinet), and Michael Strange (poet, playwright, actress) – aka Blanche Oelrichs – aka the wife of actor John Barrymore.

== First historical period ==
The founding of the League was presented above, in the introduction.

Ruth Hale's first battle (begun in 1920) with the government was to get a passport issued to her by the U.S. State Department in her own name – just as for any man. Victory was attained five years later in 1925, by the League, when the first married woman in the United States to receive a passport in her own name was Doris Fleischman, the wife of Edward L. Bernays.

An earlier victory for the group came in May 1921 when Hale got a real estate deed issued in her birth name rather than Mrs. Heywood Broun. When the time came to transfer the title of the Upper West Side apartment building, Hale refused to go on record as Mrs. Heywood Broun; the papers were changed to Ruth Hale.

The League pioneered and fought for other married women's rights, in the 1920s U.S., to do each of the following in their own names: to register at a hotel, to have bank accounts and sign checks, to have a telephone account or a store account or an insurance policy or a library card, to register (to vote) and to vote, to get a copyright, and to receive paychecks. These rights may be taken for granted today, but the legal right of a married woman in the U.S. to use her own name (rather than her husband's name) was denied by many officials and courts until a 9 Oct 1972 court decision, as documented in the 1977 book Mrs Man, by Una Stannard. Notable suffragist Elsie Hill of the National Woman's Party was a member of the League after the ratification of the 19th Amendment.

In its first incarnation the League was short lived. The group's lawyer, Rose Bres, died in 1927; by 1931 Ruth Hale, who believed that a woman is "through after forty," became depressed and then died in 1934. By the early 1930s the Lucy Stone League was inactive.

== Second historical period ==
The League was restarted in 1950 by Jane Grant, plus twenty two former members, its first meeting being on 22 Mar 1950 in New York City. Grant promptly won the Census Bureau's agreement that a married woman could use her maiden surname as her official or real name in the census.

But the "legal stone wall" that U.S. women ran into with many officials and even in the courts persisted until the U.S. Congress passed the Equal Rights Amendment on 22 Mar 1972 (never ratified by the U.S.). This 22 Mar 1972 event, plus the researching of and documentation of past legal cases by women lawyers, led to the above-mentioned 9 Oct 1972 court decision.

So in the 1950s and 1960s period, prior to 1972, the "new" League had to change its approach – it widened its focus to include all discrimination against women in the U.S.; the League became a proto – National Organization for Women (NOW). In 1976 the Lucy Stone League joined the International Alliance of Women - Equal Rights - Equal Responsibilities (IAW) as an Associate Member at the XXIV Congress "Action for Equality" which it hosted along with the Federation of Organizations for Professional Women in New York.

The reborn League operated as a non-political and non-partisan center of research and information on the status of women. It sponsored college scholarships and set up feminist libraries in high schools. It worked for gender equality in legal, economic, educational, and social relationships.

As of the early 1990s the Lucy Stone League "still gave nursing scholarships and hosted a combination annual meeting and strawberry festival" – though the gender equality issues listed in the previous paragraph had been largely taken over by the National Organization for Women (since 1966) and other women's groups.

== Third historical period ==
A modern version of the League was started in 1997, as follows: By 1997 the activities of the League had ceased and a report was published that "Alas, the League is no more." When he read this report, Morrison Bonpasse (1947–2019), a past president of the League, was "inspired" to restart the League, at the same time shifting the focus back to name equality – which was/is not addressed by NOW. This restart eventually became "the re-launching of the website (lucystoneleague.org) under the direction of a new board and its current president Ms. Cristina Lucia Stasia".

In addition, there was a group of women in New York who were still active under the name "Lucy Stone League" and this group was a dues paying affiliate of the International Alliance of Women, between 1976 and 2021. It hosted the XXXII IAW Triennial Congress in New York City in 1999.

== See also ==
- Gender equality
- Lucy Stone
- Married and maiden names
- Matrilineal
- Matriname
- Patrilineal
- Women's rights

== General literature ==
- Jane Grant, Confession of a Feminist, in The American Mercury, vol. LVII, no. 240, Dec., 1943 (microfilm), pp. 684–691. This article gives more background on the formation of the League.
