= Eleanor Pepper =

American interior designer (1904–1997)

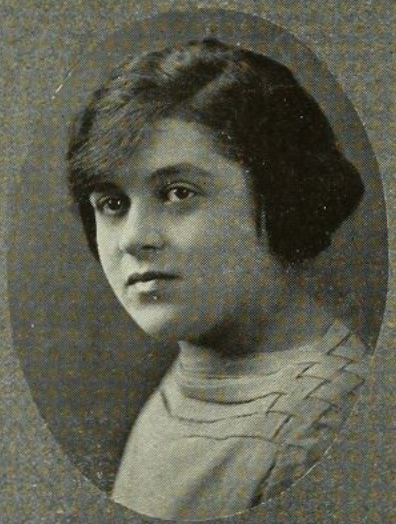
- Eleanor Pepper, from the 1924 yearbook of Barnard College
- Born: July 1, 1904; New York City, U.S.
- Died: September 7, 1997 (aged 93); New York City, U.S.
- Education: Barnard College (BA); Massachusetts Institute of Technology (BS)
- Occupations: Architect; interior designer

Eleanor G. Pepper (July 1, 1904 – September 7, 1997) was an American architect and interior designer. She taught interior design at Pratt Institute from 1950 to 1970.

== Early life ==
Pepper was born in New York City, the daughter of George Joseph Pepper and Pauline Pepper. Both of her parents were immigrants from the Russian Empire; her father ran a factory in the garment industry. She attended the Ethical Culture School and completed a BA degree at Barnard College in 1924, and a BS degree in architecture from the Massachusetts Institute of Technology in 1928. Whilst at MIT, she was a member of Cleofan, a university social club that supported women students and women's rights. She pursued further architectural studies in Paris, at the Sorbonne, where she earned at Diplôme des Etudes Superieures in 1934.

== Career ==
Pepper designed theatrical sets while still an undergraduate student at Barnard. She had her own architectural practice from the mid-1930s until 1942. During World War II, she worked on war-related projects, including designing or remodeling buildings for the USO clubs. She ran an interior design department at the architectural firm of Voorhees, Walker, Foley and Smith from 1945 to 1950; this work included designing meeting rooms for the United Nations. In 1950, she donated services to her alma mater, Barnard College, redecorating the dining halls and gymnasium on campus.

Pepper launched her own interior design company in 1950, and developed a specialty in designing hospital and care facility interiors, and senior housing. She was head of the interior design department at Pratt Institute from 1951 to 1959, and taught in the program until 1970. She also taught courses at the New York Institute of Technology and the New York School of Interior Design. Antique dealer Bruce Newman, who was a student at Pratt, recalled Pepper's aesthetic as "soulless modernism". She advised homeowners to plan interiors during the construction phase of a new space, and to avoid trends, saying "You don't want your house to be full of fads and 'design tricks' which you will soon be tired of".

Pepper was vice-president of the Architectural League of New York, and served on the board of directors of the National Institute of Architectural Education. She was also active in the Association of Women in Architecture, and in the Decorators Club.

Pepper was an outspoken advocate of women attaining equality in the architectural profession. In a letter published in 1943 in the influential design journal Task, she enumerated the kinds of discrimination women designers faced in architectural firms. These included lower wages, segregation from the men into dead-end departments, being assigned menial tasks, being offered no chance for advancement. It is a field, she wrote, where women are “discriminated against out of stupidity or malice.” The editors of Task added a note following Pepper's letter supporting her points and mentioning other correspondence from women citing the same issues.

== Publications ==
- "Long-Term Care Facilities: Special Considerations in Interior Design" (1963)

== Personal life ==
Pepper died in 1997, aged 93 years, in Carnegie Hill, Manhattan. Her papers are in the collection of Columbia University Libraries.
