= Minnie Dessau Louis =

American Jewish educator, writer and community leader (1841–1922)

- Born: June 21, 1841; Philadelphia, Pennsylvania, United States
- Died: March 12, 1922 (aged 80); Manhattan, New York, United States

Minnie Dessau Louis (June 21, 1841 – March 12, 1922) was an American educator, writer, and community leader, one of the founders of the National Council of Jewish Women.

== Early life and education ==
Miriam Dessau was born in Philadelphia, Pennsylvania in 1841, the daughter of Abraham Dessau and Fanny Zechariah Dessau. She was raised in Columbus, Georgia, but attended Packer Collegiate Institute in Brooklyn, New York, as a young woman.

== Career ==
In 1880, after several years as a volunteer Sabbath School teacher, Miriam Dessau Louis opened a school, the Louis Downtown Sabbath School, later the Hebrew Technical School for Girls. She remained president of the school until she retired in 1900, and was still active in the school's interests for several years after that. She was also president of the Hebrew Free School Kindergarten, and president of the Mount Sinai Training School for Nurses. In 1893, she spoke at the Chicago World's Fair, to the Jewish Women's Congress.

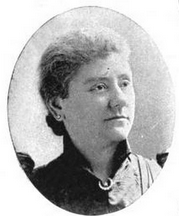
Minnie Dessau Louis (1894)

In 1894, she helped to found the National Council of Jewish Women. She served as a district inspector for New York public schools, as director of the Clare de Hirsch Home for Girls, and as field secretary for the Jewish Chautauqua Society.

As a writer, Louis edited the Personal Services department of the American Hebrew from 1901 to 1903. She published a book-length poem, Hannah and her Seven Sons: An Incident of the Persecution of the Jews by the Syrian monarch Antiochus Epiphanes, 167 B.C. in 1902.

== Personal life ==
Miriam Dessau married businessman Adolph H. Louis in 1866. She was widowed in 1897. Minnie Dessau Louis died in 1922, aged 80.

The Hebrew Technical School for Girls closed in 1932, but the building is now the site of the Manhattan Comprehensive Night and Day School, operated by the New York Public Schools, continuing Louis's work of practical education.
