= Dan Rottenberg =

American author and editor

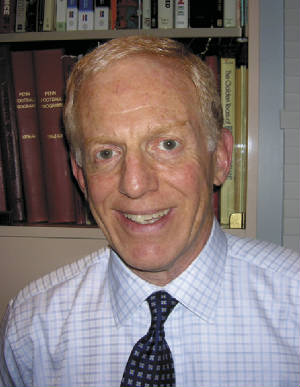
Dan Rottenberg

Dan Rottenberg (born June 10, 1942) is an author, editor and journalist. He has been the chief editor of seven publications, most recently Broad Street Review, an independent cultural arts website he launched in December 2005 and edited for eight years. He is also the author of 13 non-fiction books. He has published his weekly "Contrarian's Notebook" newsletter since 2023.

== Biography ==
From 2000 to 2004 Rottenberg was editor of Family Business, an international quarterly magazine dealing with family-owned companies. From 1996 to 1998 he was editor of the Philadelphia Forum, a weekly Philadelphia opinion paper that he founded. In 1993 he created Seven Arts, a monthly magazine based in Philadelphia. From 1981 to 1993 Rottenberg edited the Welcomat, a weekly opinion forum

Rottenberg wrote an editorial page column for The Philadelphia Inquirer from 1978 to 1997. He has written more than 300 articles for such magazines as Town & Country, Reader's Digest, The New York Times Magazine, Forbes, Civilization, American Benefactor, Personal Finance - Bloomberg, TV Guide, Playboy, Rolling Stone, and Chicago. He served as a consultant in 1981 when Forbes launched its annual "Forbes 400″ list of wealthiest Americans. Rottenberg's syndicated film commentaries appeared in monthly city magazines around the U.S. from 1971 to 1983.

Rottenberg is credited with having been the first journalist to use the word yuppie in print, writing for Chicago magazine in 1980.

Earlier in his career Rottenberg was executive editor of Philadelphia Magazine (1972–75), managing editor of Chicago Journalism Review (1970–72), a reporter with The Wall Street Journal (1968–70), and editor of the Commercial-Review, a daily newspaper in Portland, Indiana (1964–68).

Rottenberg is a native of New York City. He graduated from the Fieldston School in 1960 and the University of Pennsylvania in 1964. He lives in Philadelphia with his wife, a piano teacher. Their two grown daughters live and work in New York City.

== Publications ==
- Finding Our Fathers, a guide to tracing Jewish ancestors (Random House,1977)
- Fight On, Pennsylvania, a college football history (1985)
- Wolf, Block, Schorr and Solis-Cohen, the history of a Philadelphia law firm (1988)
- Main Line Wasp, the memoirs of Philadelphia civic leader W. Thacher Longstreth (1990); , (,
- Revolution on Wall Street, a chronicle of the U.S. securities industry (W.W. Norton, 1993)
- Middletown Jews, an oral history of the Jews of Muncie, Indiana (Indiana University Press), 1997)
- The Inheritor's Handbook, Bloomberg Press, (1998)
- The Man Who Made Wall Street, a biography of banker Anthony Drexel, University of Pennsylvania Press, 2001(
- In the Kingdom of Coal, a narrative history of the U.S. coal industry as seen through the eyes of two families. Routledge, (2003)
- Death of a Gunfighter, a biography of Pony Express superintendent Jack Slade (Westholme, 2008)
- The Outsider: Albert M. Greenfield and the Fall of the Protestant Establishment, published in 2014 by Temple University Press.
- The Education of a Journalist: My 70 Years on the Frontiers of Free Speech, published in 2022 by Redmount Press.
- The Price We Paid: An Oral History of Penn's Struggle to Join the Ivy League, 1950-55, published in 2024 by Shorehouse Books.
