= George J. Ames =

American philanthropist and investment banker (1917–2001)

George J. Ames (1917 – February 2, 2001) was an American philanthropist and investment banker at Lazard Freres.

== Biography ==
Ames was born in 1917 in Hell's Kitchen, Manhattan. Growing up, Ames attended violin lessons at Hartley House, through which he earned a scholarship to Fieldston School and Columbia College, from which he graduated in 1937. He subsequently received a law degree from Fordham University School of Law in 1942, before serving four years in the United States Navy.

Ames joined Lazard Freres in 1937 as a college student and was made a general partner in 1957. Ames was a lieutenant for André Meyer, who headed Lazard's American operations, and oversaw the firm's advisory business. He was credited with making the firm's first significant real estate investment and undertaking several real estate deals with real estate developer William Zeckendorf.

Ames was also the chairman emeritus of Columbia College's board of visitors.

== Personal life and family ==
Ames was married to Marion Ames, a noted lawyer and advocate for reform in the New York Court system. He died on February 2, 2001, at his home in Rye, New York, at age 83.
