= Elizabeth Jonas (neurologist) =

American neuroscientist

- Born: Elizabeth Ann Jonas
- Education: Yale University (1982); NYU School of Medicine (1986)
- Spouse: Thomas Eisen
- Scientific career
- Fields: Neuroscience
- Institutions: Yale School of Medicine; Marine Biological Laboratory

Elizabeth Ann Jonas is an American physician and neuroscientist at the Yale School of Medicine where she is Professor of endocrinology and neuroscience. Her seminal work includes the first in vivo electrical recordings of mitochrondrial membrane potentials and influential research on metabolic pathways of neuronal death.

== Career and research ==
An alumna of the Fieldston School, Jonas graduated from Yale University in 1982 and received her medical degree from New York University School of Medicine in 1986. As an undergraduate, she studied under the neuroscientist Rodolfo Llinás at the Marine Biological Laboratory in Woods Hole. She returned to the laboratory as a post-doctoral fellow of Len Kaczmarek where her work on the squid giant synapse constituted the first ever direct electrical recordings of mitochondrial membrane potentials in vivo. Her work since has built upon this technique to describe the mitochondrial permeability transition pore and its influence on neurological disease.

Jonas is appointed as Professor of Endocrinology within the Departments of Internal Medicine and Neuroscience at Yale School of Medicine. She also serves as the school's co-chair of the Committee on the Status of Women in Medicine and has been outspoken in her support for gender equality in medicine.

== Awards and honors ==
- National Institute of Neurological Disorders and Stroke Javits Neuroscience Investigator Award (2013, 2021)
- Association of American Physicians (2022)
