= Nicholas Lowry =

Antiques expert and auctioneer

- Born: 1967 (age 58–59); New York City, United States
- Education: Cornell University (BA)
- Occupations: Auctioneer and appraiser
- Known for: Poster appraisals on Antiques Roadshow
- Title: President and principal auctioneer at Swann Galleries

Nicholas Lowry (born 1967) is an American antiques auctioneer and appraiser. He is the president and principal auctioneer at Swann Galleries, and is known for appraising posters on the PBS series Antiques Roadshow.

== Early life and education ==
Lowry was born in 1967 into a family of antiquarian book dealers. He grew up in New York City where he attended the Ethical Culture Fieldston School. He also attended the Leys School in Cambridge, England. He graduated from Cornell University with a bachelor's degree in history.

== Career ==
After university, Lowry lived in Prague for four years, where he worked as an English teacher, entrepreneur, radio presenter, journalist, and guidebook author. Upon his return to New York he joined Swann Galleries, a New York City auction house that specializes in antique and rare works on paper. and was named president in 2001. He is also the director of Swann's vintage posters department.

Lowry appears regularly on the PBS program Antiques Roadshow to appraise posters. He is known for his tartan three-piece suits and distinctive mustache.

Lowry sits on the advisory board of the Poster House museum, and is the chair of the Fine Arts Committee of the National Arts Club.

== Personal life ==
He has a Boston Terrier named Tilda.
