= Heywood Hale Broun =

American actor and broadcaster (1918–2001)

- Publicity Photo of Heywood Hale Broun
- Born: March 10, 1918; New York City, US
- Died: September 5, 2001 (aged 83); Kingston, New York, US
- Other name: "Little Heywood"
- Education: Swarthmore College
- Occupations: Journalist; sportswriter; author; actor
- Spouse: Jane Lloyd Jones
- Children: Hob Broun
- Parent(s): Ruth Hale and Heywood Broun

Heywood Hale Broun (/ˈbruːn/; March 10, 1918 – September 5, 2001) was an American author, sportswriter, commentator and actor. He was born and reared in New York City, the son of writer and activist Ruth Hale and newspaper columnist Heywood Broun.

== Early life ==
Broun was educated at Hessian Hills School and other private schools and Swarthmore College near Philadelphia, Pennsylvania.

In 1940, Broun joined the staff at the New York tabloid PM as a sportswriter. His career was interrupted by World War II in which he served in the United States Army field artillery. When the war ended he returned to the PM newspaper and wrote for its successor, the New York Star, which ceased operations in 1949. Woodie was married to Jane Lloyd Jones, and they had one son, Heywood Orren Broun, known as Hob, a novelist, who predeceased his parents in 1987.

== Career ==
Broun appeared in thirteen Broadway productions from 1949 through 1967, including "Take Her, She's Mine", "Send Me No Flowers", and "Bells Are Ringing".

In 1966, Broun was hired by CBS, where he began working, as a color commentator, for the Triple Crown of Thoroughbred Racing alongside Jack Whitaker, staying, for two decades, for a wide variety of sporting events. Along with his long-time producer E. S. "Bud" Lamoreaux, he became a permanent fixture from the initial broadcast in January 1966 of the Saturday edition of the CBS Evening News with Roger Mudd. Broun was noted for his "merry mustache, his loud jackets and his suitcase full of words, oh what words," as Lamoreaux later put it in a retrospective of Broun's work that appeared in a series of 36 half-hour shows on ESPN called Woodie's World.

Broun's five-minute Saturday night features on CBS covered major sports stories and cultural events. His broadcasts included coverage of Super Bowls I and III featuring Lombardi and Namath, the boxing rivalries of Ali and Frazier, along with DiMaggio and Ted Williams and "the Miracle Mets." He also covered prominent figures in basketball and horse racing, including Russell and Cousy and Wilt Chamberlain, and Nicklaus and Secretariat and Ruffian. Broun also reported from the Mexico City Olympics where he reported on important world events like the "Black Power salute" of the American sprinters John Carlos and Tommy Smith at the playing of the National Anthem in 1968. Additionally he reported from the 1972 Munich Olympics regarding the terrorist attack on the Israeli wrestling team that resulted in the deaths of 11 athletes and coaches.

However, in between the "big stories," he filed pieces from the national marbles championship in Wildwood, New Jersey, the national left-handed golfers championship in Galesburg, Illinois and a profile of a rodeo clown in Cheyenne, Wyoming. Broun also took a lap in a racing sports car with Britain's Stirling Moss, showed up as the coxswain of the Harvard crew as they prepared for their annual battle on the Thames River in New London, Connecticut, with arch-rival Yale, and was run over by a wild horse at the American Indian rodeo in Oregon, after which he tracked down an American original, "Buckskin Bill" Hart, who was living a hermit's life at the confluence of the Salmon River and Wildhorse Creek, somewhere near a remote dude ranch in Mackey Bar, Idaho.

== Woodie's World ==
In 2002, ESPN Classic debuted a series devoted to Broun's reporting, titled Woodie's World. The 30 minute program typically featured four stories from Broun's Saturday featurettes with current information inserted as needed.

Woodie's World ran for 36 episodes from 2002 through 2005. Beginning in 2009, ESPN Classic brought the series back in reruns, which continue to air sporadically on the network.

"Sports do not build character. They reveal it." - Heywood Hale Broun

== Acting career ==
Broun acted in a number of films, including:

- The Odd Couple (1968): In this film, he plays himself, a sportswriter at a New York Mets versus Pittsburgh Pirates game. While fellow sportswriter Oscar Madison (Walter Matthau) takes a phone call from roommate Felix Ungar (Jack Lemmon) about mundane dinner plans, the Mets pull off a triple play. Broun exclaims, "A triple play, Oscar! One of the greatest plays I've ever seen, and you missed it! You missed it, Oscar!"
- For Pete's Sake (1974)
- HouseSitter (1992)

Additionally, he sometimes appeared on television series in guest or supporting roles. In 1952 and 1957, Broun was cast in two episodes of the anthology series, Robert Montgomery Presents. From 1955 to 1957, he guest starred in three episodes of The Phil Silvers Show, also known as You'll Never Get Rich.

Broun was cast in 1962 and 1963 in different character roles in five episodes of the NBC police sitcom, Car 54, Where Are You?, starring Joe E. Ross and Fred Gwynne. He subsequently appeared twice on the ABC sitcom, The Patty Duke Show, as Mr. Mickel in "The Babysitters" (1963) and as Mr. Fleming in "This Little Patty Went to Market" (1964). He appeared in 1965 as Charles Kane in "The Sworn Twelve" of the CBS legal drama, The Defenders, starring E. G. Marshall. Broun had a cameo appearance as himself in the 1969 movie Some Kind of a Nut, starring Dick Van Dyke.

== Books ==
- A Studied Madness (1965)
- Tumultuous Merriment (1979)
- Whose little boy are you? : A memoir of the Broun family (1983)

== Radio ==
Broun hosted The Literary Guild's First Edition, a nationally syndicated radio show devoted to authors and books, produced by Cinema Sound Ltd., New York beginning in 1973. A later version of the show, Broun on Books was sponsored by Mobil. Over 200 episodes of the show were produced. Guests included Pete Seeger and Josh White; Robert Kimball, Bill Bolcum, Max Morarth and Dan Morgenstern; Donald Bogle and Rosalind Cash; Kurt Vonnegut; Joyce Maynard and Jeff Greenfield; Penelope Gilliat, Herman Weinberg and Howard Koch; Günter Grass; and Bob Woodward and Carl Bernstein.

== Death ==
Broun died on September 5, 2001, in Kingston, New York.
