= Jewish Foundation for Education of Women =

Organisation financing education of Jewish women

The Jewish Foundation for Education of Women (JFEW) is an organization created to assist women with the financial means to meet their educational and career goals, providing scholarships and professional development. The Foundation partners with schools and nonprofits, such as CUNY, the Hebrew Free Loan Society of New York, and Stuyvesant High School. Grantees include Foundation for Jewish Culture, Juilliard School and the Manhattan School of Music.
