= Jane Grant =

American journalist (1892–1972)

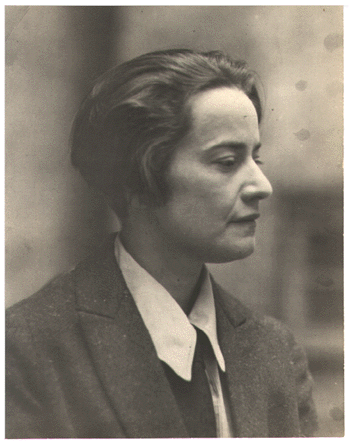
- Born: Jeanette Cole Grant; May 29, 1892; Joplin, Missouri, U.S.
- Died: March 16, 1972 (aged 79); Litchfield, Connecticut, U.S.
- Occupation: Journalist
- Known for: Co-founder of The New Yorker
- Spouses: Harold Ross (m. 1920; div. 1929) William B. Harris (m. 1939)

Jane Grant (born Jeanette Cole Grant; May 29, 1892 – March 16, 1972) was a New York City print journalist who co-founded the magazine The New Yorker with her first husband, Harold Ross.

== Early life ==
Jane Grant was born on May 29, 1892 in Joplin, Missouri, and grew up and went to school in Girard, Kansas. Grant originally trained to be a vocalist. She came to New York City at 16 to pursue singing, but fell into journalism when she joined the staff of The New York Times in the society department.

== Early career ==
She soon worked her way into the city room as a reporter and became close friends with the critic Alexander Woollcott. As a journalist for the Times (the first woman reporter assigned to the city room), she covered women's issues, questioning public figures about their views on the status of women and interviewing women who worked in traditionally male professions. She wrote for the Times for 15 years.

== Military career ==
During World War I, Grant, who was also a talented singer and dancer, talked her way onto a troopship to France by joining the entertainment with the YMCA. She joined the American Red Cross and entertained soldiers during shows in Paris and at camps. In France, Woollcott introduced her to the future "Vicious Circle" members, including Harold Ross. Grant and Ross married in 1920. The "Vicious Circle" later became the Algonquin Round Table. She returned to the Times after the war.

== Career ==
In 1921, Grant helped to form the Lucy Stone League, which was dedicated, in the manner of Lucy Stone, to helping women keep their maiden names after marriage, as Grant did after her two marriages. In 1950, Grant and 22 former members restarted the Lucy Stone League; its first meeting was on 22 Mar 1950 in New York City. That year Grant won the Census Bureau's agreement that a married woman could use her birth surname as her official or real name in the census. (The New York Times, 10 Apr 1950).

Grant was one of the founding members of the New York Newspaper Women's Club and served on its first board of directors after incorporation in 1924.

With the backing of Raoul Fleischmann, Grant and Ross established The New Yorker in 1925. As editor, Ross is credited with driving the success of the magazine, however Ross is quoted saying the magazine would not have been a success without Jane's contribution. Grant was chiefly a business and content consultant for the magazine and initially helped to gather investments towards starting the magazine. She brought her friend Janet Flanner into the magazine's coterie of correspondents, commissioning her enduring Letter from Paris column. The feature continues to be published today, although it now includes many other cities. Grant later produced a special overseas issue for the armed forces during World War II.

Ross and Grant divorced in 1929 after nine years of marriage.

During World War II, Grant wrote for several magazines, including Ellery Queen's Mystery Magazine and The New Yorker. Grant wrote Confession of a Feminist for American Mercury in 1943. In the essay, she describes the experience of being a feminist, recounting her early career as a woman reporter among men for the Times and exploring discriminatory laws and practices. Grant continued to be active in feminist causes, reactivating the Lucy Stone League and expanding its purpose. She continued to work for the rights of women into the 1960s, advocating for passage of the Equal Rights Amendment and serving on the National Council of Women.

In 1968, Grant published a memoir about her life entitled Ross, The New Yorker and Me (Reynal and Co., 1968 New York City). She was encouraged to do so by her second husband, William Harris, and ultimately dedicated the book to him.

== Personal life ==
In 1939, she married William B. Harris, the editor of Fortune magazine. She and Harris moved from Manhattan to Litchfield, Connecticut. The couple founded White Flower Farm out of a barn on their property. In the 1950s, they started a successful mail-order business for home gardening.

== Death and legacy ==
Grant died on March 16, 1972 on the Connecticut farm she shared with her husband. Harris sold the nursery to Eliot Wadsworth in 1976.

In 1974, Harris was approached for an endowment by the University of Oregon. After a visit to the school, he agreed to fund a center that engaged in research on women and gender studies. In 1976, Harris donated Jane Grant's papers to the university. Upon his death in 1981, he left a $3.5 million bequest in his wife's name to establish the Center for the Study of Women in Society.

Grant was portrayed by the actress Martha Plimpton in the 1994 film Mrs. Parker and the Vicious Circle.

== Bibliography ==
- Ross, The New Yorker and Me (New York: Reynal, 1968.
- Confession of a Feminist. The American Mercury, vol. LVII, no. 240, Dec., 1943, pp. 684–691.
- I Saw What I Could (unpublished account of her travels in the Soviet Union, held at the University of Oregon)
