= Harold Ross =

American journalist (1892–1951)

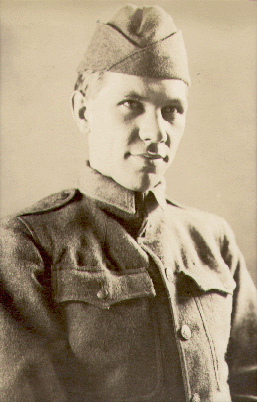
- Born: Harold Wallace Ross; November 6, 1892; Aspen, Colorado, U.S.
- Died: December 6, 1951 (aged 59); Boston, Massachusetts, U.S.
- Resting place: Aspen Grove Cemetery, Aspen, Colorado
- Occupations: Magazine editor; journalist
- Years active: 1910s–1951
- Spouse: Jane Grant (m. 1920; div. 1929)
- Children: 1
- Military career
- Allegiance: United States
- Branch: United States Army
- Service years: 1917–1919
- Conflicts: World War I

Harold Wallace Ross (November 6, 1892 – December 6, 1951) was an American journalist who co-founded The New Yorker magazine in 1925 with his wife Jane Grant, and was its editor-in-chief until his death.

== Early life ==
Born in a prospector's cabin in Aspen, Colorado, Ross was the son of Scots-Irish immigrant miner George Ross and schoolteacher Ida (née Martin) Ross. When he was eight, the family left Aspen because of the collapse in the price of silver, moving to Redcliff and Silverton, Colorado, then to Salt Lake City, Utah. In Utah, he worked on West High School's paper (The West High Red & Black) and was a stringer for The Salt Lake Tribune, the city's leading daily newspaper. He dropped out of school at 13 and ran away to his uncle in Denver, where he worked for The Denver Post as a reporter. Though he returned to his family, he did not return to school, instead getting a job at the Salt Lake Telegram, a smaller afternoon daily newspaper.

By the time he was 25 he had worked for at least seven different papers, including the Marysville, California Appeal; the Sacramento Union; the Panama Star and Herald; the New Orleans Item; the Atlanta Journal; the Hudson Observer in Hoboken; the Brooklyn Eagle; and the San Francisco Call.

In Atlanta, Georgia, he covered the murder trial of Leo Frank, one of the "trials of the century".

== Military service ==
During World War I, he enlisted in the United States Army's 18th Engineer Regiment in 1917. In France, he edited the regimental journal, The Spiker, and went to Paris to work for the Stars and Stripes, serving from February 1918 to April 1919. He claimed to have walked 150 miles from officer's training school at Langres, France to reach Paris to write for Stars and Stripes, where he met Alexander Woollcott, Cyrus Baldridge, Franklin Pierce Adams, and Jane Grant, who would become his first wife and helped back The New Yorker.

After the war, he returned to New York City and assumed the editorship of a magazine for veterans, The Home Sector. It folded in 1920 and was absorbed by the American Legion Weekly. He spent a few months at Judge, a humor magazine.

== The New Yorker ==
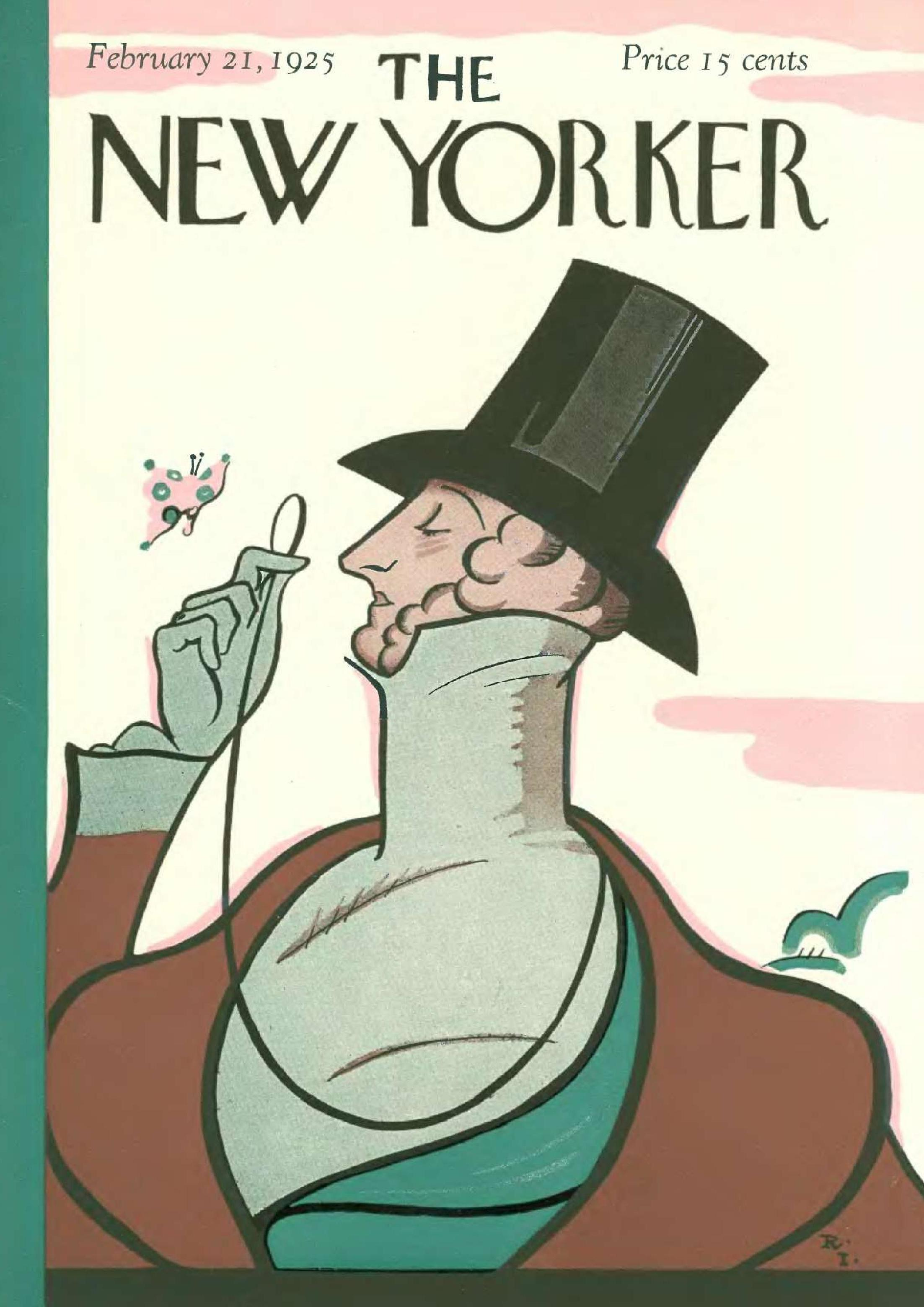
The image of Eustace Tilley on the iconic cover of the debut issue of The New Yorker.

Ross envisioned a new journal of metropolitan sensibilities and a sophisticated tone. This led him to co-found The New Yorker with his wife Jane Grant. The first issue was dated February 21, 1925. In partnership with yeast heir Raoul Fleischmann, they established F-R Publishing Company to publish it.

Ross was an original member of the Algonquin Round Table. He used his contacts in "The Vicious Circle" to help get The New Yorker started. Ross, said by Alexander Woollcott to resemble "a dishonest Abe Lincoln", attracted talent to his new publishing venture, ultimately featuring writers such as Woollcott, James Thurber, E. B. White, John McNulty, Joseph Mitchell, Katharine S. White, S. J. Perelman, Janet Flanner, Wolcott Gibbs, St. Clair McKelway, John O'Hara, Robert Benchley, Dorothy Parker, Vladimir Nabokov, Sally Benson, A. J. Liebling, and J. D. Salinger.

The original prospectus for the magazine read, "The New Yorker will be the magazine which is not edited for the old lady in Dubuque." Thurber noted the prospectus does not read or sound like Ross, summarizing Ross's goals so:

[Casuals] was Ross's word for fiction and humorous pieces of all kinds ... [it] indicated Ross's determination to give the magazine an offhand, chatty, informal quality. Nothing was to be labored or studied, arty, literary, or intellectual.

Ross forbade sex as a subject, checking all art and articles for off-color jokes or double entendre and rejected advertisements thought unsuitable. Ross disliked fatalistic pieces and sought to minimize "social-conscious stuff," calling such articles "grim."

During the Second World War, the New Yorker ran on a skeleton staff after many contributors joined the war effort. Ross and his assistant William Shawn would put in six to seven days a week. To cultivate relationships, they published some PR works from the United States Department of War. "Survival", John Hersey's profile of future president John F. Kennedy, was also submitted to the department before receiving clearance. Kennedy's father Joseph P. Kennedy Sr. was disappointed that the story had gone to the New Yorker, which he deemed too small and niche. An irritated Ross, who saw his magazine as an underdog competing against the larger powerhouses, relented into allowing a reprint of the story in the Reader's Digest. Hundreds of thousands of copies would be distributed during the younger Kennedy's eventual campaigns for the U.S. House of Representatives and later the presidency.

Ross worked long hours and ruined all three of his marriages as a result. He was a careful and conscientious editor who strove to keep his copy clear and concise. One famous query to his writers was "Who he?" Ross believed the only two people who were recognizable to everyone in the English-speaking world were Harry Houdini and Sherlock Holmes.

Quite aware of his limited education, Ross treated Fowler's Modern English Usage as his Bible. He edited every issue of the magazine from the first until his death—a total of 1,399 issues. He was notorious for overusing commas. Ross designated Shawn as his preferred successor, which Fleischmann confirmed after Ross died.

James Thurber quotes the reminiscences of many colleagues of both men in his 1959 memoir, The Years with Ross, citing his former chief's pranks, temper, profanity, anti-intellectualism, drive, perfectionism, and an almost permanent social discomfort, and how these all shaped The New Yorker staff. Ross and his magazine slowly became famous among literati and newspapermen. Thurber quoted John Duncan Miller, the Washington, D.C., correspondent for The Times of London, after meeting Ross in 1938:

During the first half hour, I felt that Ross was the last man in the world who could edit the New Yorker. I left there realizing that nobody else in the world could.

He kept up a voluminous correspondence, which is preserved at the New York Public Library.

== Personal life ==
Ross married Jane Grant in 1920 but they divorced in 1929.

== Death ==
Ross died of heart failure in Boston, Massachusetts, on December 6, 1951, during an operation to remove a lung after it was discovered his bronchial carcinoma had metastasized.

== Bibliography ==
- Kunkel, Thomas (1995), Genius in Disguise: Harold Ross of the New Yorker, New York: Random House, ISBN 0-679-41837-7.
- Yagoda, Ben (2000), About Town: The New Yorker and the World It Made, New York: Scribners, ISBN 0-684-81605-9.
- Top Hat and Tales: Harold Ross and the Making of the New Yorker (movie) (Carousel Film and Video, 2001, 47 minutes)

== Notes ==
Preceded by None	Editor of The New Yorker; 1925–1951	Succeeded by William Shawn
