= Heywood Broun =

American journalist (1888–1939)

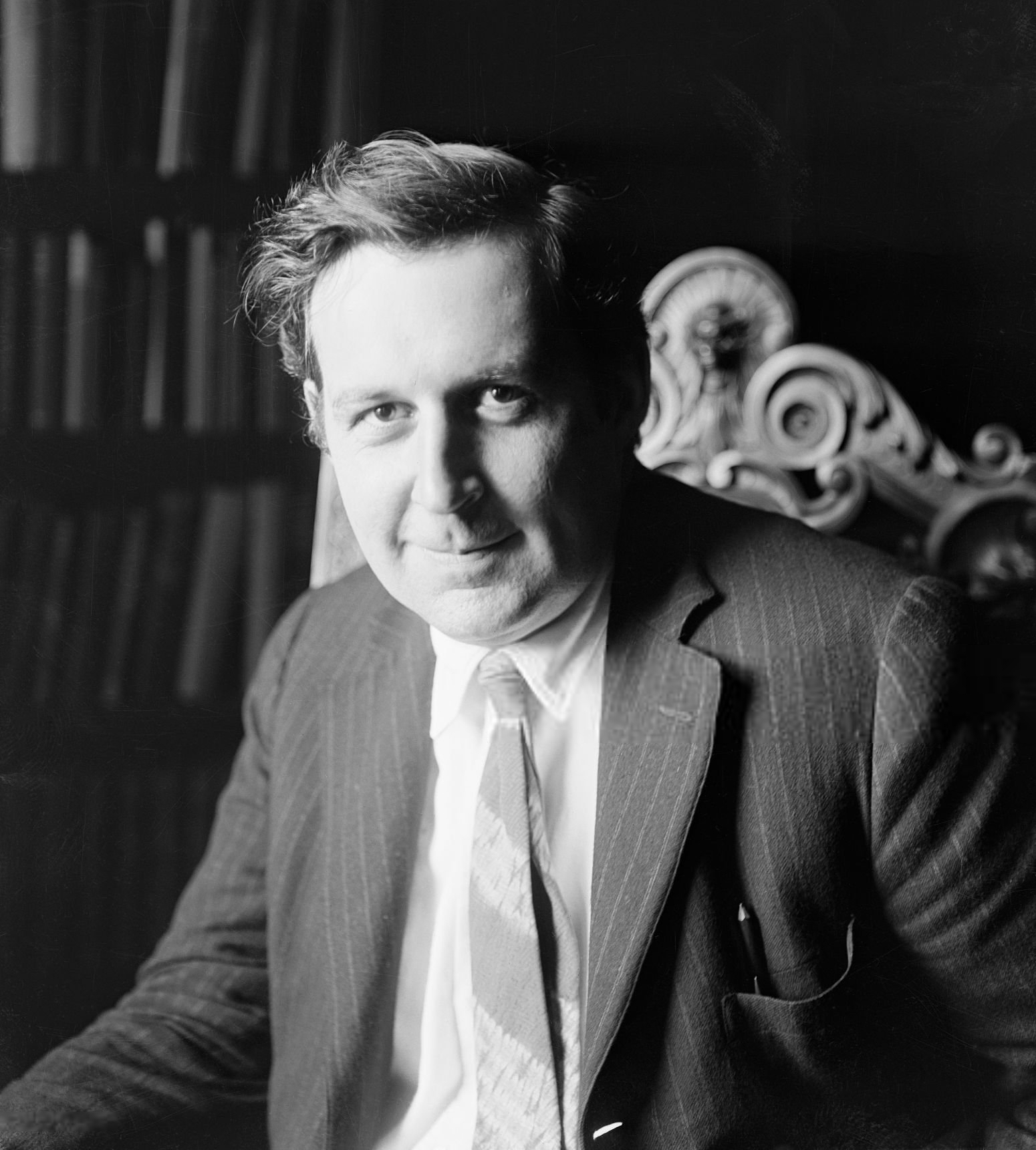
- Broun, c. 1927

President of the American Newspaper Guild
- In office December 15, 1933 – December 18, 1939
- Preceded by: Office established
- Succeeded by: Kenneth G. Crawford

Personal details
- Born: Heywood Campbell Broun Jr. December 7, 1888 New York City, New York, U.S.
- Died: December 18, 1939 (aged 51) New York City, U.S.
- Party: Socialist
- Spouses: Ruth Hale (m. 1917; div. 1933) Maria Dooley (m. 1935)
- Children: Heywood Hale Broun
- Education: Harvard University
- Occupation: Journalist, sportswriter, columnist
- Awards: J. G. Taylor Spink Award (1970)

Heywood Campbell Broun Jr. (/ˈbruːn/; December 7, 1888 – December 18, 1939) was an American journalist. He worked as a sportswriter, newspaper columnist, and editor in New York City. He founded the American Newspaper Guild, later known as The Newspaper Guild and now as The NewsGuild-CWA. Born in Brooklyn, New York, he is best remembered for his writing on social issues and his championing of the underdog. He believed that journalists could help right wrongs, especially social ills.

== Career ==
Broun was born in Brooklyn, the third of four children born to Heywood C. Broun and Henrietta Marie (née Brose) Broun.

Broun attended Harvard University, but did not earn a degree. He began his professional career writing baseball stories in the sports section of the New York Morning Telegraph. Broun worked at the New York Tribune from 1912 to 1921, rising to drama critic. He started working in 1921 for the New York World. While at the World, he started writing his syndicated column, It Seems to Me. In 1928, Broun moved to the Scripps-Howard newspapers, including the New York World-Telegram. Broun's column was published in the World-Telegram until Scripps-Howard abruptly decided not to renew his contract. He was then picked up by the New York Post. Broun's only column appeared in that paper two days before his death.

As a drama critic, in 1917 Broun wrote about actor Geoffrey C. Stein in the controversial play The Awakening of Spring: "[...] Geoffrey Stein gave a ludicrously inadequate performance in the important role of Melchior. It was easily the worst performance we have ever seen on any stage." Stein sued the New York Tribune and Broun for libel; but in light of the judge's jury instructions, Broun and the Tribune won the case. A few weeks later, he had to review a production with Stein in the cast. His only mention of the actor was in the last sentence of his column: "We did not think Geoffrey Stein was up to his usual standards."

Broun coined the statement "Posterity is as likely to be wrong as anybody else". It is used widely, often in arguments about documentation and history. From 1927 to 1937, Broun wrote a regular column, titled "It Seems to Heywood Broun", for the magazine The Nation. His column included criticism of another employer, the New York World, who fired Broun as a result. Broun later left The Nation for the rival The New Republic.

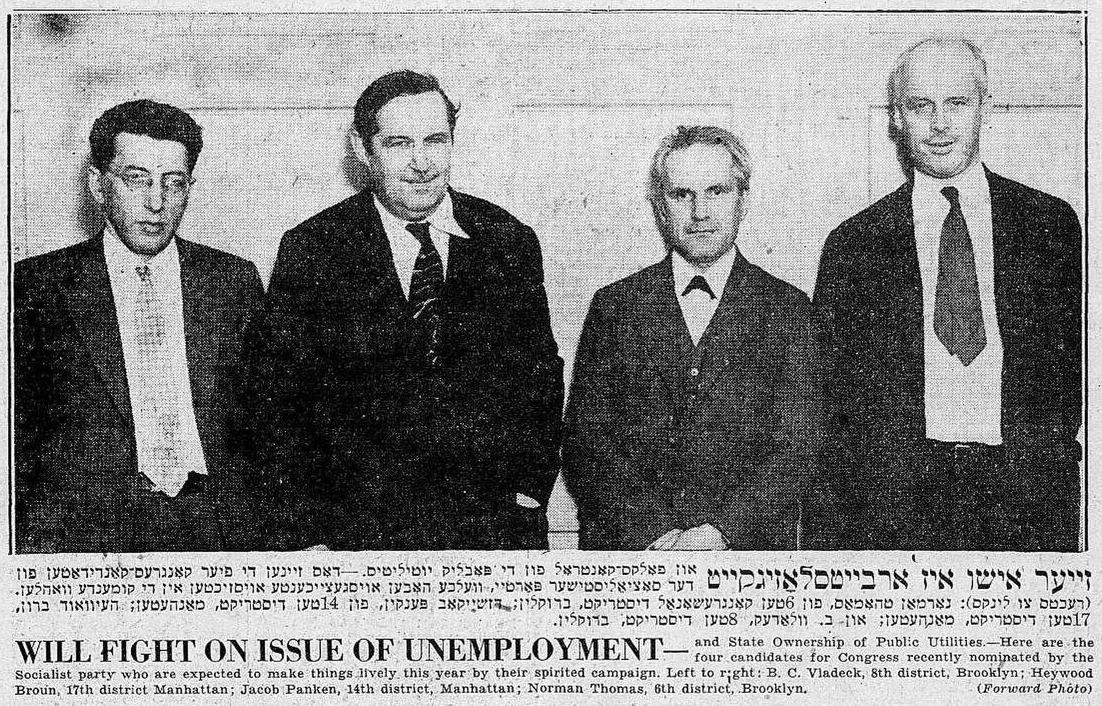
Four of the Socialist Party's candidates for Congress in New York, 1930. Left to right: Baruch Charney Vladeck, Heywood Broun, Jacob Panken, and Norman Thomas.

In 1930, Broun unsuccessfully ran for the U.S. Congress, as a Socialist. A slogan of Broun's was "I'd rather be right than Roosevelt."

In 1933, along with New York Evening Post Editor Joseph Cookman, John Eddy of The New York Times and Allen Raymond of the New York Herald Tribune, Broun helped to found The Newspaper Guild.

Beginning February 8, 1933, Broun starred in a radio program, The Red Star of Broadway, on WOR in Newark, New Jersey. Broun was featured as "The Man About Town of Broadway." Sponsored by Macy's, the program also included musicians and minstrels. In 1938, Broun helped found the weekly tabloid Connecticut Nutmeg, soon renamed Broun's Nutmeg.

== Personal life ==
In 1915, Broun met Russian ballerina Lydia Lopokova and they quickly became engaged. She broke off the relationship to rejoin the Ballets Russes in 1916. On June 7, 1917, Broun married writer-editor Ruth Hale, a feminist who later co-founded the Lucy Stone League. At their wedding, the columnist Franklin P. Adams characterized the usually easygoing Broun and the more strident Hale as "the clinging oak and the sturdy vine." The couple had one son, broadcaster Heywood Hale Broun.

Along with his friends (the critic Alexander Woollcott, writer Dorothy Parker and humorist Robert Benchley), Broun was a member of the famed Algonquin Round Table from 1919 to 1929. His usually disheveled appearance led to him being likened to "an unmade bed." He was also close friends with the Marx Brothers, and attended their show The Cocoanuts more than 20 times. Broun joked that his tombstone would read, "killed by getting in the way of some scene shifters at a Marx Brothers show."

In November 1933, Ruth Hale divorced Broun. In 1935, he married a widowed chorus girl named Maria Incoronata Fruscella Dooley (stage name Connie Madison). Seven months before his death in 1939, Broun, who had been an agnostic, converted to Roman Catholicism following discussions with then Reverend Fulton Sheen and Reverend Edward Patrick Dowling,

Broun died of pneumonia, at age 51, in New York City. More than 3,000 mourners attended his funeral at St. Patrick's Cathedral in Manhattan. Attendees included New York City Mayor Fiorello La Guardia, Franklin P. Adams, actor-director George M. Cohan, playwright-director George S. Kaufman, New York World editor Herbert Bayard Swope, columnist Walter Winchell and actress Tallulah Bankhead. Broun is buried in the Cemetery of the Gate of Heaven in Hawthorne, New York.

== Legacy ==
- In Broun's honor, the NewsGuild-CWA sponsors an annual Heywood Broun Award for outstanding work by a journalist, especially work that helps correct an injustice.
- In 1970, the J. G. Taylor Spink Award was made posthumously to Broun by the Baseball Writers' Association of America.
- Broun was portrayed by the actor Gary Basaraba in the 1994 film Mrs. Parker and the Vicious Circle.
- In the first season of the Amazon Prime television series Z: The Beginning of Everything, Broun is portrayed by the actor Tony Manna.
- In July, 1967 a street in Co-op City, Bronx was named in honor of Broun (Broun Place).

== Works ==
- The A.E.F. (1918)
- Our Army at the Front (1918)
- The 51st Dragon (1919)
- Seeing Things at Night (1921)
- The Boy Grew Older (1922)
- Pieces of Hate (1922)
- The Sun Field (1923)
- Sitting On The World (1924)
- Gandle Follows His Nose (1926)
- Anthony Comstock: Roundsman of the Lord (with Margaret Leech) (1927)
- Christians Only: A Study in Prejudice (1931)
- It Seems to Me (1935) —Collection of columns
- Collected Edition (1941) —Collection of columns
