= Ethical Culture Fieldston School =

Private school in New York City

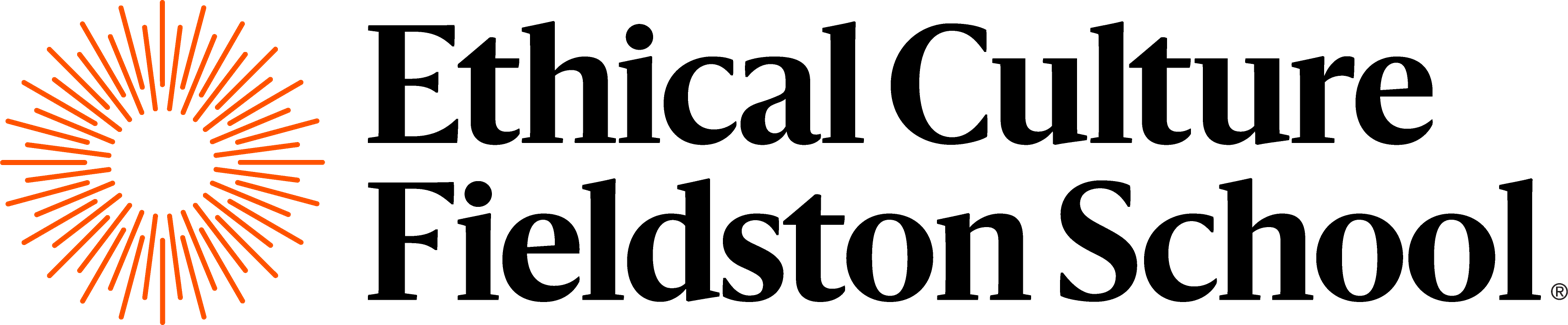

Location
- 3901 Fieldston Road; New York City, New York 10471; United States; 40°53′21″N 73°54′23″W

Information
- Type: Private, day, college-preparatory
- Motto: Latin: Fiat lux ("Let there be light")
- Established: 1878; 148 years ago
- Founder: Felix Adler
- Head of school: Kyle Wilkie-Glass
- Teaching staff: Approx. 270
- Grades: PK–12
- Gender: Coeducational
- Enrollment: 1,662
- Student to teacher ratio: 6:1
- Campus size: 18 acres (73,000 m^{2})
- Campus type: Urban
- Color: Orange
- Athletics conference: Ivy Preparatory School League
- Mascot: Eagles
- Accreditation: National Association of Independent Schools (NAIS)
- Newspaper: Fieldston News and Fieldston Political Journal and Fieldston Science Bulletin
- Yearbook: Fieldglass
- Other publications: Fieldston News The Fieldston LP, Fieldston Lit Mag, Middle School News, Dope Ink Prints, The Hill Chronicle, Inklings, The Fieldston Political Journal
- Song: "Fieldston Lower School" (Fieldston Lower School); "It's the Feeling Inside" (Ethical Culture); "I'm On My Way" (Middle School); "Iam Canamus" (Upper School)
- Website: www.ecfs.org

The Ethical Culture Fieldston School (ECFS), also known more simply as Fieldston or Ethical Culture, is a private pre-K through twelfth-grade coeducational school in New York City with two campuses, in Manhattan and in the Bronx. The school is a member of the Ivy Preparatory School League. The school serves approximately 1,700 students with 480 faculty and staff.

The school consists of four divisions: Ethical Culture (pre-K through fifth grade that is located on the Upper West Side of Manhattan) and located in the Riverdale section of the Bronx are, Fieldston Lower that also serves pre-K through fifth grade, Fieldston Middle that serves sixth–eighth grades, and Fieldston Upper that serves ninth–twelfth grades. Tuition and fees for the school were $60,595 for the 2022–2023 school year and $63,020 for the 2023–2024 school year.

== Academics ==
The core of the Fieldston educational program is the study and practice of ethics that is infused throughout the interdisciplinary curriculum.

Fieldston terminated its participation in the Advanced Placement Program in 2002 to give its faculty more freedom in what they teach. Students still may take AP exams, but officially, the school no longer sponsors such courses.

== Athletics ==
Fieldston has 60 junior varsity and varsity athletic teams in the middle and upper schools. Student athletes have won 26 state and 65 league titles since the year 2000. Teams are part of the Ivy Preparatory School League and include:

Fall sports

- Cross country
- Field hockey
- Football
- Soccer
- Girls tennis High school only
- Volleyball
- Water polo

Winter sports

- Basketball
- Ice hockey
- Indoor track
- Squash
- Swimming
- Table tennis

Spring sports

- Baseball
- Golf
- Lacrosse
- Softball
- Boys tennis High school only
- Track and field
- Ultimate Frisbee

Their Girls Varsity Volleyball team won the 2023 New York State Independent School (NYSAIS) Championship after having an undefeated season with 21 wins.

Their Boys Varsity Baseball team won the 2025 New York State Independent School (NYSAIS) Championship against Long Island Lutheran High School.

== History ==
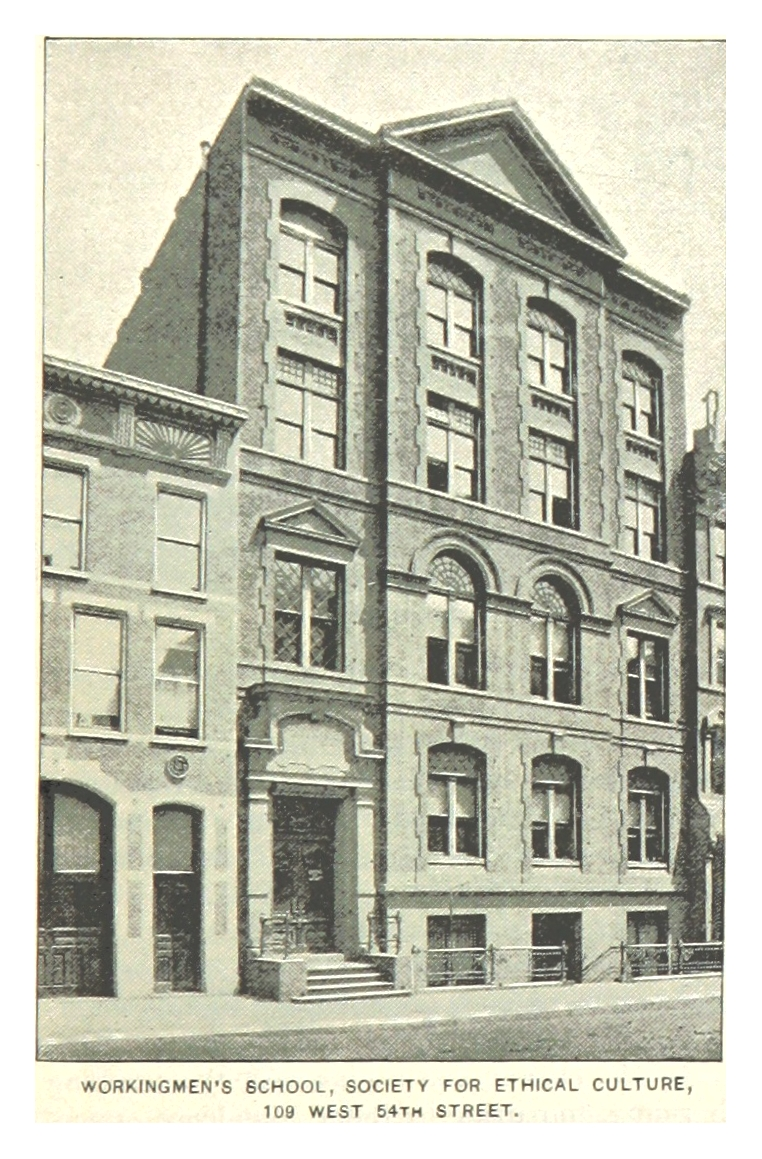
Workingmen's school in Manhattan, 1893

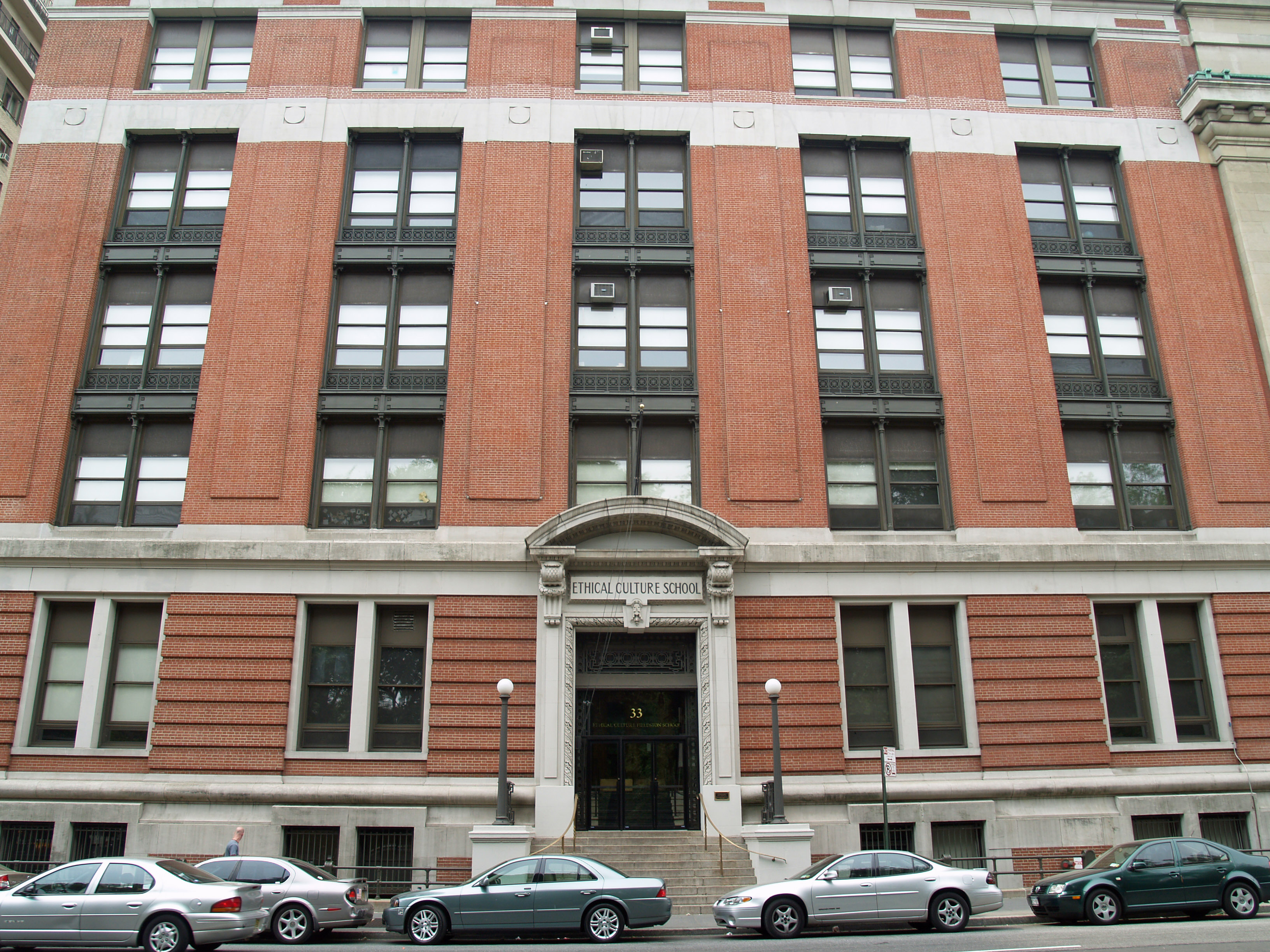
Ethical Culture in Manhattan

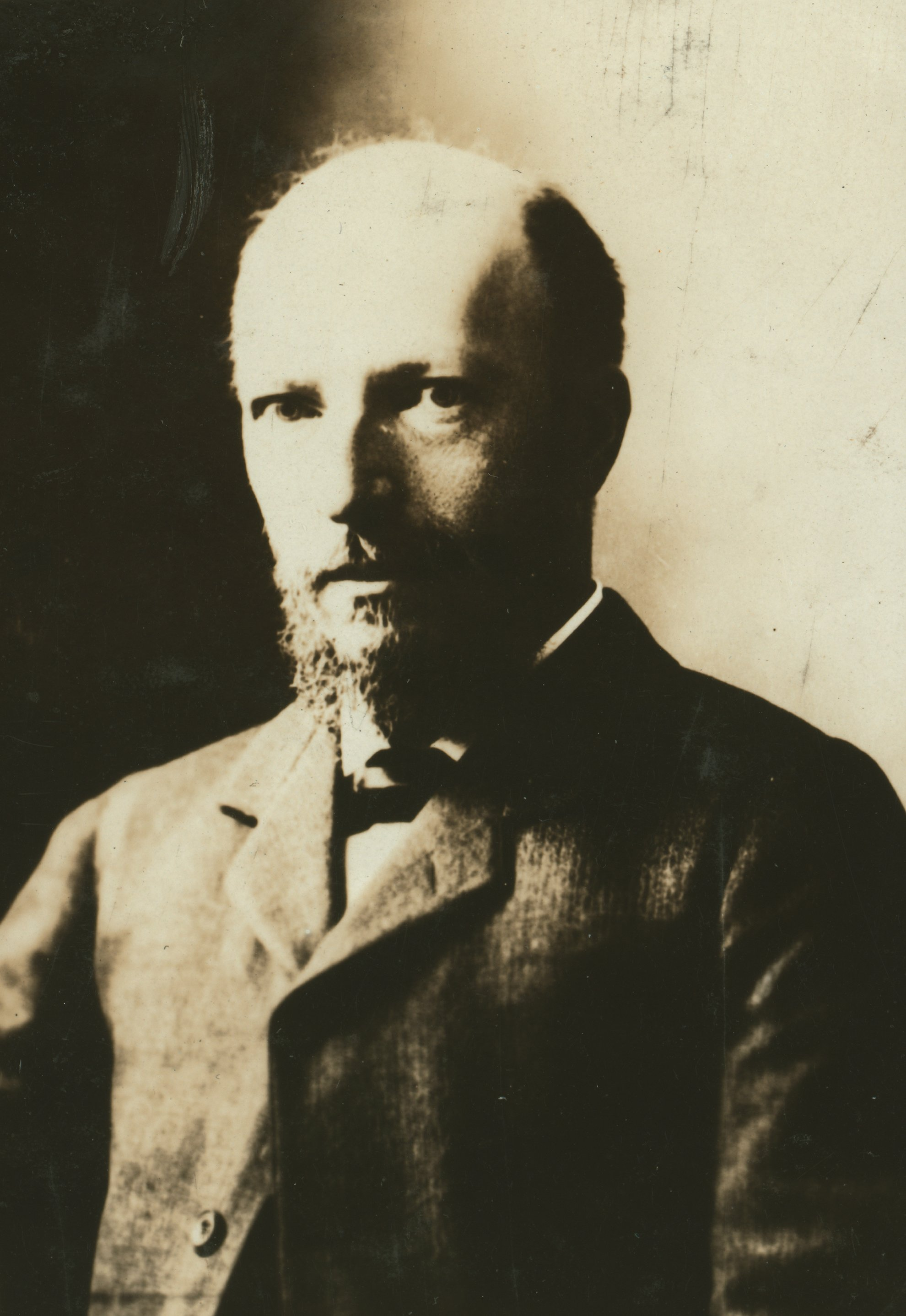
Felix Adler, c. 1913

The school opened in 1878 as a free kindergarten, founded by Felix Adler, who was 26 years of age at the time. One of the early faculty members at the school was American sociologist Lewis Hine. In 1880, elementary grades were added and the school was named as, the Workingman's School. By 1890, the school's academic reputation encouraged many more wealthy parents to seek it out, so the school was expanded to accommodate the upper-class as well and began charging tuition. In 1895, the name was changed to "The Ethical Culture School". In 1903, the New York Society for Ethical Culture became its sponsor.

One significant figure in the life of the school was Mabel R. Goodlander, who joined as a teacher in 1903. She spent more than three decades there, including overseeing an experiment in elementary education, ending her career as principal of the Fieldston Lower School.

=== Twentieth century ===
In March 1970, approximately 60 students occupied the administration building in protest to demand that more black and Puerto Rican students be admitted to the school. They also aimed to have a greater number of minority courses, teachers, advisors, employees. The school agreed to some of the student demands.

=== Twenty-first century ===
Beginning in 2015, the school began having the children assemble, based on their personal affinity, into weekly "affinity group" mandatory meetings in order to discuss issues of race and bias. The experimental trial program was met with controversy from some Fieldston parents.

In February 2019, a video that is believed to have been created years previously was discovered by administrators after it was shared during a dispute among some of the students. Students in the video use derogatory and racist language. The students involved who were still enrolled in the school were punished; however, some students who thought the punitive actions were not adequate, staged a sit-in. Throughout the week students occupied the administration building overnight, receiving widespread support from the student body and many parents. The students presented the administrators with demands that included increased racial bias training, more faculty of color, more students of color recruitment, and a required ethnic studies course. Their demands were agreed to and plans for implementation were established. These students founded SOCM (Students of Color Matter) and continued as an organization after the end of the occupation of the administration building and it works to implement initiatives based on the original 16 demands.

The school also attracted attention in November 2019 after it hosted a guest speaker who compared the Israeli treatment of Palestinians to the Holocaust, a statement that was denounced as antisemitic. The critics included two Reform Jewish rabbis who spoke at the school in the wake of the controversy and subsequently published a New York Times editorial about the incident.

In January 2020, the school fired a Jewish teacher who tweeted opposition to an invitation extended to two speakers on anti-Semitism because of his allegation that they were "white" and Zionists. Some parents requested the reinstatement of the teacher.

== Student life ==
At the two lower schools and in the middle school, students may participate in a variety of before-school and after-school programs that include fencing, cooking, golf, robotics, chess, and many sports.

In the upper and middle schools, there are more than 80 student-led clubs, affinity groups, and service-learning organizations.

=== Student publications ===
The Fieldston News is a student-run newspaper at Fieldston Upper.

Inklings is the literary journal for the entire school, published and edited by students in the upper school. It is available only in print and at the end of each academic year.

== Peer schools ==
Ethical Culture Fieldston is a part of the Ivy Preparatory School League, as are many elite private schools in New York City. Although sometimes they are rivals, three high schools in the Riverdale section of the Bronx: Fieldston, Riverdale, and Horace Mann are known collectively as "the hill schools" because all three are located on a hilly area above Van Cortlandt Park.

== Notable alumni and former students ==
See List of Ethical Culture Fieldston School alumni

== Notable faculty ==
- Shauneille Perry, drama teacher
- Liz Williamson, dance teacher

== See also ==
- Education in New York City
- List of high schools in New York City
