= Act One (play) =

Play written by James Lapine

Act One is a play written by James Lapine, based on Moss Hart's 1959 autobiography of the same title. The play premiered on Broadway in 2014.

== Production ==
Act One premiered on Broadway at the Vivian Beaumont Theater in Lincoln Center on March 20, 2014 (previews), officially on April 17, 2014. Directed by James Lapine, the cast featured Santino Fontana, Tony Shalhoub (as George S. Kaufman and Moss Hart) and Andrea Martin as Hart's theatrical agent Frieda Fishbein. Martin played three women in Moss Hart's life; Shalhoub also played three roles: as the older Hart, Moss's father, and George S. Kaufman. Lighting design by Ken Billington. The play closed on June 15, 2014, after 67 performances and 31 previews. It was filmed to be shown on the PBS television program "Live from Lincoln Center." The filmed production was first televised on PBS in November 2015 & then uploaded to the Lincoln Center At Home Youtube page on June 19, 2020.

The play had a reading on Martha's Vineyard in July 2012, with Tony Shalhoub, Debra Monk, Chuck Cooper and David Turner. The play was developed at the Vineyard Arts Project. The book had previously been adapted into a film in 1963.

== Overview ==
The play is an adaptation of Moss Hart's autobiography Act One. The play, narrated by the older Moss Hart, traces his life from being poor in The Bronx to becoming famous and successful as a Broadway writer and director. The play depicts Hart's meeting and collaboration with George S. Kaufman. Act One ends with the production of the Hart-Kaufman successful play, Once in a Lifetime in 1930.

== Critical reception ==
Ben Brantley, in his review for The New York Times, wrote "whatever its flaws, 'Act One,'... brims contagiously with the ineffable, irrational and irrefutable passion for that endangered religion called the Theater."

Elysa Gardner, in her review in USA Today, wrote that the play "... is rather an appreciation, most notable for its deep affection and almost deferential reverence. To say the play lacks the complex poignance of the 'Sunday in the Park with George' and 'Into the Woods' librettist's best work wouldn't be fair; however wry Hart's humor or complicated his relationships — with show business, his family, other people — his 'Act One' is a nostalgic and ultimately upbeat reflection on fulfilling a dream....Lapine captures that essence and the period, on the page and on the stage."

The play received nominations for five Tony Awards, with Beowulf Boritt winning for what Playbill called his "captivating, multi-level set design, built on a large-scale revolve..."

== Awards and nominations ==
=== Original Broadway production ===
Year	Award ceremony	Category	Nominee	Result
2014	Tony Award	Best Play	James Lapine	Nominated
2014	Tony Award	Best Actor in a Play	Tony Shalhoub	Nominated
2014	Tony Award	Best Scenic Design of a Play	Beowulf Boritt	Won
2014	Tony Award	Best Costume Design of a Play	Jane Greenwood	Nominated
2014	Tony Award	Best Sound Design of a Play	Dan Moses Schreier	Nominated
2014	Drama Desk Award	Outstanding Sound Design of a Play	Dan Moses Schreier	Nominated
2014	Drama League Award	Distinguished Performance	Tony Shalhoub	Nominated
2014	Outer Critics Circle Award	Outstanding New Broadway Play		Nominated
2014	Outer Critics Circle Award	Outstanding Actor in a Play	Tony Shalhoub	Nominated
2014	Outer Critics Circle Award	Outstanding Featured Actress in a Play	Andrea Martin	Won
2014	Outer Critics Circle Award	Outstanding Set Design	Beowulf Boritt	Nominated
