= Seven arts =

Seven arts may refer to:

- The Seven Liberal Arts, being grammar, logic, rhetoric, arithmetic, geometry, music, and astronomy
- A subdivision of the arts, being painting, architecture, sculpture, literature, music, theatre, and filmmaking
- The Seven Arts, an artistic magazine
- Seven Arts Productions, a movie production company
- Seven Arts, an early 1990s defunct joint venture releasing company between Carolco Pictures and New Line Cinema
- Seven Arts Pictures, a UK independent film production company
- Seven Arts Shop, a Tudor Storybook retail shop in Carmel-by-the-Sea, California
- Seven Arts Building, a cement-block framed commercial building in Carmel-by-the-Sea, California

== See also ==
- Seven Lively Arts (disambiguation)
