= Once Upon a Rhyme (musical) =

American musical

Once Upon a Rhyme: A Musical Tale
- Music: Ronvé O’Daniel & Jevares C. Myrick
- Lyrics: Ronvé O’Daniel
- Book: Ronvé O’Daniel

Once Upon a Rhyme is a musical with book and lyrics by Ronvé O’Daniel, and music by O’Daniel and Jevares C. Myrick. After a developmental reading at the 2015 New York Musical Theatre Festival where it won the “Award for Excellence,” the show has been presented at the Eugene O’Neill Theater Center National Music Theater Conference, the Johnny Mercer Writers Colony at Goodspeed Musicals, and the New Works Festival at TheatreWorks Silicon Valley. The musical was formerly titled iLLA! A Hip Hop Musical.

== Overview ==
A high school classically ballet trained dancer dreams of becoming a hip hop star. With pressures to succeed mounting, he adopts a dangerous persona to get closer to fortune, fame and win an open mic battle to gain respect and find his authentic voice.

== Production history ==
=== 2015 ===
Once Upon a Rhyme: A Musical Tale, formerly known as iLLA! A Hip Hop Musical, began development in 2015.

Originally slated to be a one-man show and album inspired by Ronvé O’Daniel's real life experiences, it quickly evolved into a full-fledged musical with the changing scope of the story.

In 2015, an IndieGoGo campaign was created to fund a production of the musical. It finished with 127% of its goal funded, and funds went toward the show's July 20 premiere at the New York Musical Theatre Festival, where it won the NYMF Developmental Reading Series’ “Award for Excellence”.

=== 2016 ===
In February 2016, iLLA! underwent a weeklong workshop at the Toledo School for the Arts. This workshop culminated in three staged readings on February 5 and 6, 2016 at the Toledo School for the Arts Attic Theatre.

Development continued in June 2016, when iLLA! was workshopped in Atlanta at the Cobb Center for Excellence in the Performing Arts for over three weeks. Five workshop performances were held on June 10 and 12.

The show returned for NYMF's 2016 Festival to be workshopped with a concert version as part of the Next Link Project performed on July 29, July 31, and August 2, 2016, where it won NYMF's “Best of Fest” award.

Following NYMF, musical selections were performed at Joe's Pub at The Public Theater in November 2016.

=== 2017 ===
Songs from iLLA! were performed for the New York Musical Theatre Festival in June 2017, as part of an Underground Fundraiser held by NYMF at SubCulture.

In July 2017, developmental readings were held at the Eugene O’Neill Theater Center's National Music Theater Conference, where Ronvé took home the “Georgia Bogardus Holof Lyricist Award.”

=== 2018 ===
Development continued in January 2018 when Ronvé O’Daniel and Jevares Myrick were selected for the 2018 Johnny Mercer Writers Colony at Goodspeed Musicals. iLLA! was further developed during the four-week think tank for musical theater writers.

The musical was renamed Once Upon a Rhyme and received a two-week dance lab at the New York University Tisch School of the Arts, choreographed by Stephanie Klemons in Spring 2018. In August 2018, this new version of the show presented three staged readings as a part of TheatreWorks Silicon Valley's 2018 New Works Festival.

Once Upon a Rhyme held an all-Tisch School Of The Arts production at New York University. beginning on September 27, 2018. It was presented at the Abe Burrows Theater and ran through October 6, 2018.

== Other mentions ==
Playbill named the musical as one of its “Top 10 Musicals Not to Miss” in July.

TimeOut New York called it a “Must See Show” in July.
