= George S. Kaufman =

American playwright, theater director and producer (1889–1961)

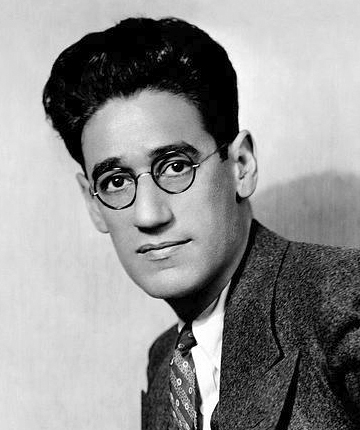
- George S. Kaufman in 1928
- Born: George Simon Kaufman; November 16, 1889; Pittsburgh, Pennsylvania, US
- Died: June 2, 1961 (aged 71); New York City, US
- Occupations: Playwright; theater director; theater producer/manager; theater performer; humorist; drama critic
- Spouses: Beatrice Bakrow (m. 1917; died 1945) Leueen MacGrath (m. 1949; div. 1957)
- Writing career
- Genres: Comedy, political satire
- Notable works: Of Thee I Sing; You Can't Take It with You
- Notable awards: Pulitzer Prize for Drama (1932 and 1937); Tony Award Best Director (1951)

George Simon Kaufman (November 16, 1889 – June 2, 1961) was an American playwright, theater director and producer, humorist, and drama critic. He wrote comedies and political satire including several musicals for the Marx Brothers. He won the Pulitzer Prize for Drama for the musical Of Thee I Sing (with Morrie Ryskind and Ira Gershwin) in 1932, and won again in 1937 for the play You Can't Take It with You (with Moss Hart). He also won the Tony Award for Best Direction of a Musical in 1951 for Guys and Dolls.

== Early years ==
George S. Kaufman was born to Joseph S. Kaufman, a hatband manufacturer, and Nettie Meyers in Pittsburgh, Pennsylvania. He had two sisters, Ruth and Helen. Kaufman's family was Jewish. He showed early interest in theater, joining the drama society at Rodef Shalom Congregation and writing his first play in 1903. After graduating from high school in 1907, he briefly studied law at Pennsylvania Western University, but withdrew after three months. He took on a series of odd jobs, including surveyor, clerk, stenographer, and silk salesman.

== Career ==
Kaufman contacted Franklin P. Adams in 1909, and began contributing humorous material to Adams' column in New York Evening Mail that year. Adams, with whom he became close friends, helped Kaufman get his first newspaper job as a humor columnist for The Washington Times in 1911, though he was soon fired for being Jewish. He returned to New York and was hired as a reporter for The New York Tribune in 1915, working under Heywood Broun, before securing a position with The New York Times in 1917, replacing Brock Pemberton as drama editor and working under Alexander Woollcott. Around this time, Kaufman took classes at Columbia University with Hatcher Hughes and Clayton Hamilton, and wrote several plays. He remained with The New York Times until 1930. An anecdote goes that a press agent once asked him, "How do I get our leading lady's name into your newspaper?" to which Kaufman replied, "Shoot her."

=== Theater ===
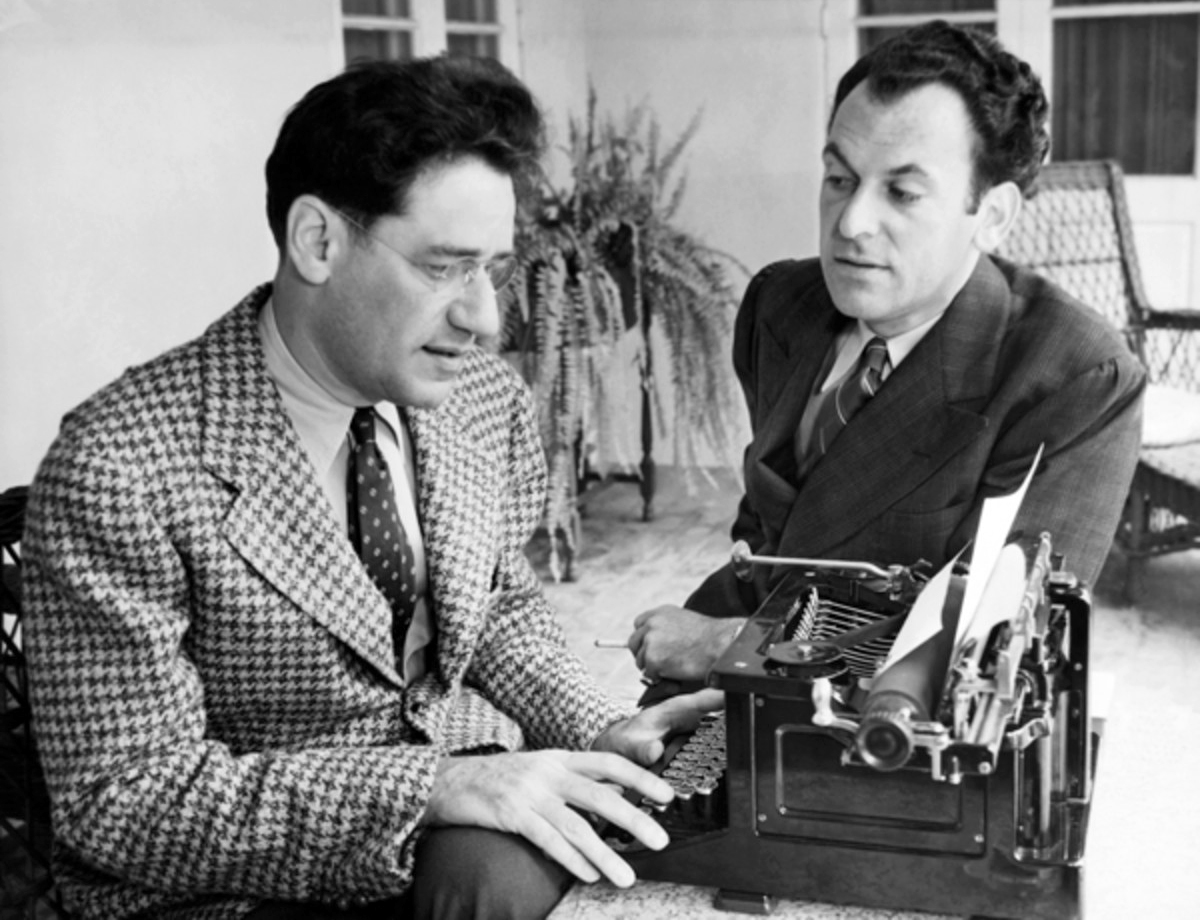
George S. Kaufman and Moss Hart in 1937

In 1918, producer George C. Tyler hired Kaufman to work on a play for actress Lynn Fontanne. Someone in the House, a melodrama based on a magazine story written by Larry Evans, and cowritten with Walter C. Percival, would be the occasion of Kaufman's Broadway debut on September 4, 1918 at the Knickerbocker Theatre. The play opened on Broadway during that year's serious flu epidemic and ran for only 32 performances, prompting Kaufman to humorously advise people to "avoid crowds—see Someone in the House." Kaufman's next play Dulcy, a comedy cowritten with Marc Connelly, premiered in 1921 with greater success; again produced by Tyler and featuring Fontanne.

Every Broadway season from 1921 through 1958 had a play written or directed by Kaufman. Since Kaufman's death in 1961, revivals of his work on Broadway were produced in the 1960s, the 1970s, the 1980s, the 2000s, and the 2010s. Kaufman wrote only one play alone, The Butter and Egg Man in 1925. With Marc Connelly, he wrote Merton of the Movies, Dulcy, and Beggar on Horseback; with Ring Lardner, he wrote June Moon; with Edna Ferber, he wrote The Royal Family, Dinner at Eight, and Stage Door; with John P. Marquand, he wrote a stage adaptation of Marquand's novel The Late George Apley; and with Howard Teichmann, he wrote The Solid Gold Cadillac. According to his biography on PBS, "he wrote some of the American theater's most enduring comedies" with Moss Hart. Their work includes Once in a Lifetime (in which he also performed), Merrily We Roll Along, The Man Who Came to Dinner, and You Can't Take It with You, which won the Pulitzer Prize in 1937.

For a period, Kaufman lived at 158 West 58th Street in New York City. The building later was the setting for Stage Door. It is now the Park Savoy Hotel, and for many years was considered a single room occupancy hotel.

==== Musical theater ====
Despite his claim that he knew nothing about music and hated it in the theater, Kaufman collaborated on many musical theater projects. His most successful of such efforts include two Broadway shows crafted for the Marx Brothers, The Cocoanuts, written with Irving Berlin, (Note: Some accounts of Berlin's song "Always"—including those of Kaufman and Groucho Marx—held that the song was originally written for The Cocoanuts. More recent retrospectives have refuted this, though the song was included in a 1996 revival of The Cocoanuts.) and Animal Crackers, written with Morrie Ryskind, Bert Kalmar, and Harry Ruby. According to Charlotte Chandler, "By the time Animal Crackers opened ... the Marx Brothers were becoming famous enough to interest Hollywood. Paramount signed them to a contract". Kaufman was one of the writers who excelled in writing intelligent nonsense for Groucho Marx, a process that was collaborative, given Groucho's skills at expanding upon the scripted material. Though the Marx Brothers were notoriously critical of their writers, Groucho and Harpo Marx expressed admiration and gratitude towards Kaufman. After Kaufman's death, according to Dick Cavett, Groucho considered Kaufman "a great friend of his, a man he's often said was his god."

Humor derived from political situations was of particular interest to Kaufman. He collaborated on the hit musical Of Thee I Sing, which won the 1932 Pulitzer Prize, the first musical so honored, and its sequel Let 'Em Eat Cake, as well as one troubled, but eventually successful, satire that had several incarnations, Strike Up the Band. Working with Kaufman on these ventures were Ryskind, George Gershwin, and Ira Gershwin. Also, Kaufman, with Moss Hart, wrote the book to I'd Rather Be Right, a musical starring George M. Cohan as Franklin Delano Roosevelt (the U.S. president at the time), with songs by Richard Rodgers and Lorenz Hart. He also co-wrote the 1935 comedy-drama First Lady. In 1945, Kaufman adapted Gilbert and Sullivan's H.M.S. Pinafore into Hollywood Pinafore.

Kaufman also contributed to major New York revues, including The Band Wagon (which shared songs but not plot with the 1953 film version) with Arthur Schwartz and Howard Dietz. His often-anthologized sketch "The Still Alarm" from the revue The Little Show lasted long after the show closed. Another well-known sketch of his is "If Men Played Cards as Women Do". Also, musicals have been based on Kaufman properties, such as the 1981 musical version of Merrily We Roll Along, adapted by George Furth and Stephen Sondheim. The musical Sherry! (1967) was based on his play The Man Who Came to Dinner.

==== Directing and producing ====
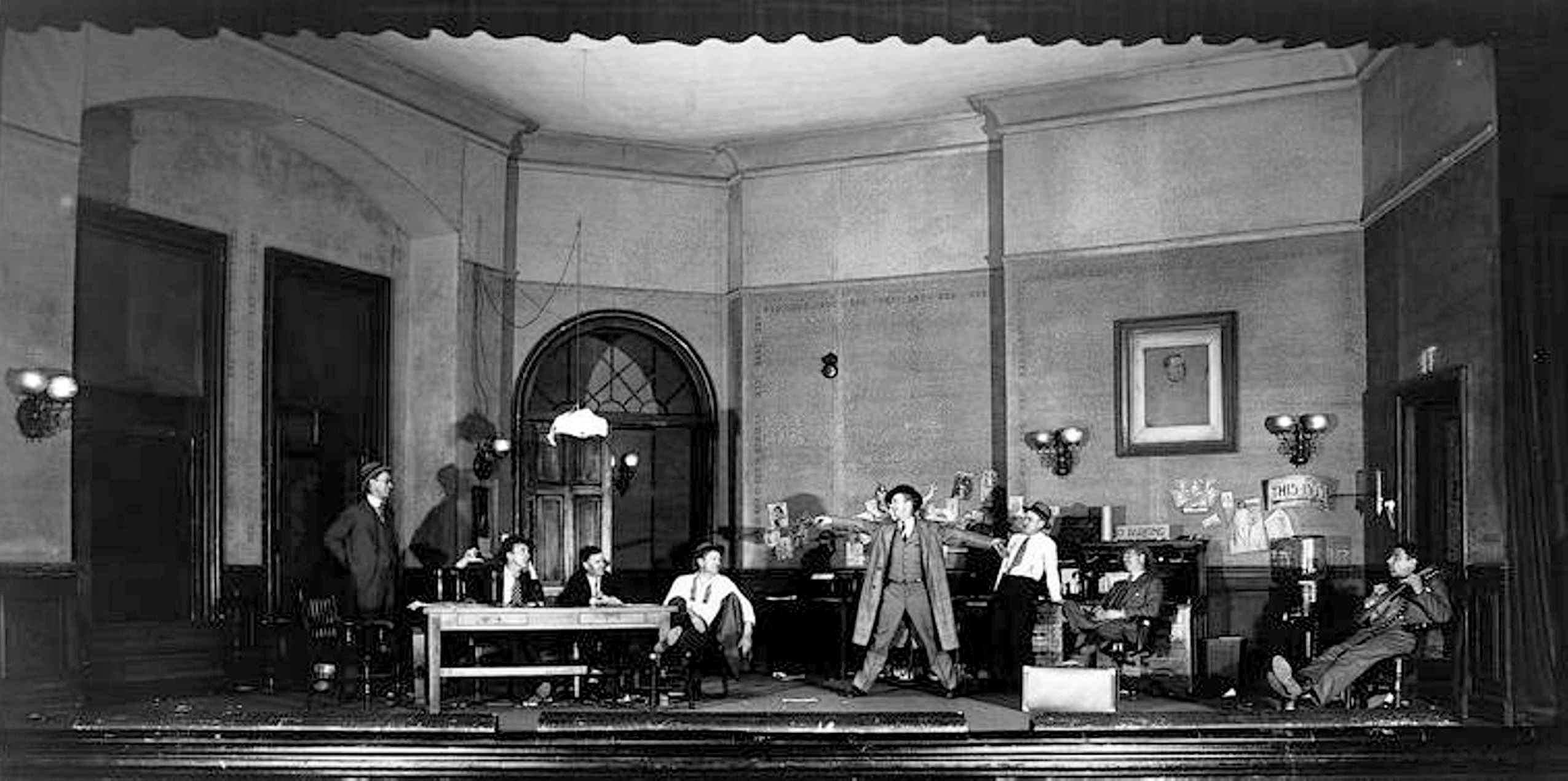
The Front Page (1928)

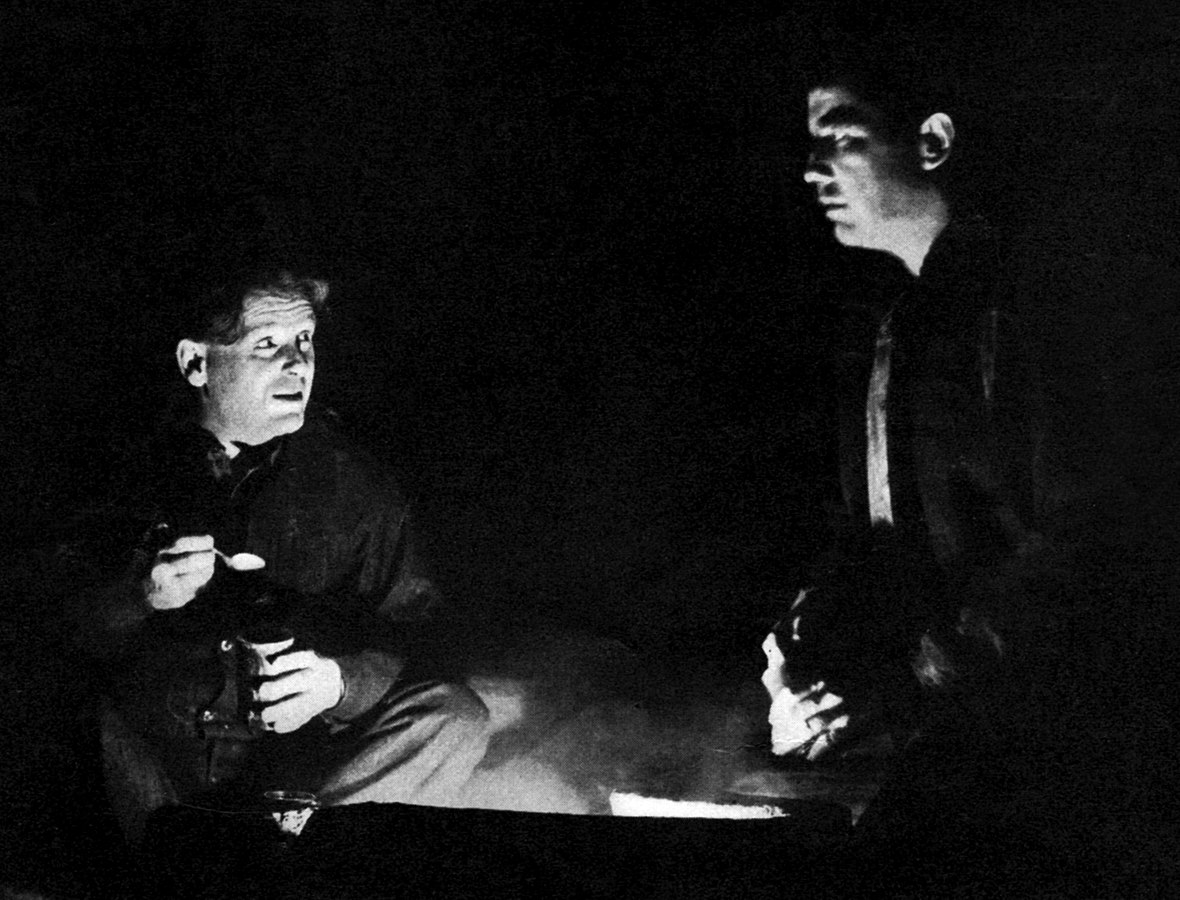
Of Mice and Men (1937), with Wallace Ford and Broderick Crawford

Kaufman directed the original or revival stage productions of many plays and musicals, including The Front Page by Charles MacArthur and Ben Hecht (1928), Of Thee I Sing (1931 and 1952), Of Mice and Men by John Steinbeck (1937), My Sister Eileen by Joseph Fields and Jerome Chodorov (1940), Hollywood Pinafore (1945), The Next Half Hour (1945), Park Avenue (1946, also co-wrote the book), Town House (1948), Bravo! (1948, also co-wrote the script), Metropole (1949), the Frank Loesser musical Guys and Dolls, for which he won the 1951 Best Director Tony Award, The Enchanted (1950), The Small Hours (1951, also co-wrote the script), Fancy Meeting You Again (1952, also co-wrote the script), The Solid Gold Cadillac (1953, also co-wrote the script), and Romanoff and Juliet by Peter Ustinov (1957).

Kaufman produced many of his own plays, as well as those of other writers. For a short time, from circa 1940 to 1946, Kaufman, with Moss Hart and Max Gordon, owned and operated the Lyceum Theatre.

=== Film and television ===
Many of Kaufman's plays were adapted into Hollywood and British films. Among the more well-received were Dinner at Eight, Stage Door (almost completely rewritten by others for the film version) and You Can't Take It with You (changed significantly by others for the film version), which won the Best Picture Oscar in 1938, and The Dark Tower. He also occasionally wrote directly for the movies, most significantly the screenplay for A Night at the Opera for the Marx Brothers. His only credit as a film director was The Senator Was Indiscreet (1947) starring William Powell.

From 1949 until midway through the 1952–1953 season, he appeared as a panelist on the CBS television series This Is Show Business. Kaufman made a remark about the excessive airing of "Silent Night" during the Christmas season, "Let's make this one program", he said, "on which no one sings 'Silent Night'." The resulting public outcry prompted his dismissal by CBS. In response, Fred Allen said, "There were only two wits on television: Groucho Marx and George S. Kaufman. Without Kaufman, television has reverted to being half-witted." It would be more than a year before Kaufman appeared on TV again.

=== Bridge ===
Kaufman was a prominent player of bridge, probably both auction bridge and contract bridge. The New Yorker published many of his humorous items about the card game; at least some have been reprinted more than once, including:

- "The Great Kibitzers' Strike of 1926" and the suggestion that bridge clubs should post notice whether the North–South or the East–West pairs are holding good cards.
- Kaufman was notoriously impatient with poor players. One such partner asked permission to use the men's room, according to legend, and Kaufman replied: "Gladly. For the first time today I'll know what you have in your hand."
- On sitting South: (1) "No matter who writes the books or articles, South holds the most terrific cards I ever saw. There is a lucky fellow if ever I saw one." (2) Oswald Jacoby reported a deal that Kaufman played marvelously in 1952, after which he cracked, "I'd rather sit South than be the President."
- On coffeehousing, "I'd like a review of the bidding with all the original inflections."

His first wife Beatrice Bakrow Kaufman was also an avid bridge player, and an occasional poker player with Algonquin men, who wrote at least one New Yorker article on bridge herself, in 1928.

== Personal life ==
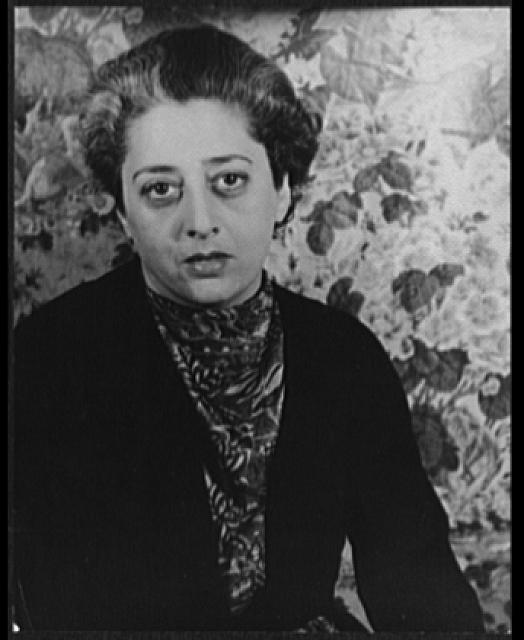
Beatrice Kaufman in 1934

In the 1920s, Kaufman was a member of the Algonquin Round Table, a circle of writers and show business people. In the Moss Hart autobiography Act One, Hart portrayed Kaufman as a morose and intimidating figure, uncomfortable with any expressions of affection between human beings—in life or on the page. Hart writes that Max Siegel said: "Maybe I should have warned you. Mr Kaufman hates any kind of sentimentality—can't stand it!" This perspective, along with a number of taciturn observations made by Kaufman himself, led to a simplistic but commonly held belief that Hart was the emotional soul of the creative team while Kaufman was a misanthropic writer of punchlines. Kaufman preferred never to leave Manhattan. He once said: "I never want to go any place where I can't get back to Broadway and 44th by midnight."

Kaufman was married to his first wife Beatrice from 1917 until her death in 1945. They had one daughter, Anne Kaufman (Booth). The Kaufmans had an open marriage, in which each was free to see other people discreetly.

Known as "Public Lover Number One," Kaufman had affairs with several prominent Broadway actresses. In 1936, he found himself in the center of a notorious scandal when, in the midst of a child custody suit, the former husband of screen actress Mary Astor threatened to publish her diary which contained extremely explicit details of sexual encounters between Kaufman and the actress. In 1952, the court ordered the unread diary to be burned but several excerpts were leaked to the press. Some of the sexually explicit portions of Mary Astor's writing about Kaufman were reprinted in New York magazine in 2012 and Vanity Fair magazine in 2016. Kaufman had an affair with actress Natalie Schafer during the 1940s.

Kaufman joined the theater club The Lambs in 1944.

On May 26, 1949, four years after Beatrice's death, he married actress Leueen MacGrath, with whom he collaborated on a number of plays before their divorce in August 1957. Kaufman died in New York City on June 2, 1961, at the age of 71. His granddaughter, Beatrice Colen, was an actress who had recurring appearances on both Happy Days and Wonder Woman.

In 1979, Donald Oliver compiled and edited a collection of Kaufman's humorous pieces, with a foreword by Dick Cavett.

== Portrayals ==
Kaufman was portrayed by the actor David Thornton in the 1994 film Mrs. Parker and the Vicious Circle and by Jason Robards in the 1963 film Act One. In the 2014 Broadway adaptation of the latter by James Lapine, he was played by Tony Shalhoub.

The title character of the 1991 Coen brothers film Barton Fink, who is a playwright, bears a strong physical resemblance to Kaufman.

Kaufman is portrayed in the film Mank by actor Adam Shapiro.

== Legacy ==
Kaufman has influenced many writers worldwide, including Billy Wilder, Preston Sturges, Neil Simon, Tom Stoppard, Mel Brooks, Woody Allen, Aaron Sorkin, Larry David and Swedish author and playwright Vladimir Oravsky.

== Works ==
=== Theater ===
- Someone in the House (with Walter C. Percival, 1918)
- Dulcy (with Marc Connelly, 1921)
- To the Ladies (with Marc Connelly, 1922)
- Merton of the Movies (with Marc Connelly, 1922)
- No Sirree! (sketch contributions, 1922)
- The '49ers (sketch contributions, 1922)
- The Deep Tangled Wildwood (with Marc Connelly, 1923)
- Helen of Troy, New York (book, with Marc Connelly, 1923)
- Beggar on Horseback (with Marc Connelly, 1924)
- Be Yourself (book and lyrics, with Marc Connelly, 1924)
- Minick (with Edna Ferber, 1924)
- The Butter and Egg Man (1925)
- The Cocoanuts (book, 1925)
- The Good Fellow (with Herman J. Mankiewicz, 1926)
- The Royal Family (with Edna Ferber, 1927)
- Strike Up the Band (book, 1927)
- Animal Crackers (book, with Morrie Ryskind, 1928)
- The Channel Road (with Alexander Woollcott, 1929)
- June Moon (with Ring Lardner, 1929)
- Once in a Lifetime (with Moss Hart, 1930)
- Of Thee I Sing (book, with Morrie Ryskind, 1931)
- The Band Wagon (book, with Howard Dietz, 1931)
- Dinner at Eight (with Edna Ferber, 1932)
- Flying Colors (sketch contributions, 1932)
- Let 'Em Eat Cake (book, with Morrie Ryskind, 1933)
- The Dark Tower (with Alexander Woollcott, 1933)
- Bring on the Girls! (with Morrie Ryskind, 1934)
- Merrily We Roll Along (with Moss Hart, 1934)
- First Lady (with Katharine Dayton, 1935)
- Stage Door (with Edna Ferber, 1936)
- You Can't Take It with You (with Moss Hart, 1936)
- I'd Rather Be Right (book, with Moss Hart, 1937)
- The Fabulous Invalid (with Moss Hart, 1938)
- Sing Out the News (book, with Moss Hart, 1938)
- The American Way (with Moss Hart, 1939)
- The Man Who Came to Dinner (with Moss Hart, 1939)
- George Washington Slept Here (with Moss Hart, 1940)
- The Land Is Bright (with Edna Ferber, 1941)
- The Late George Apley (with John P. Marquand, 1944)
- Seven Lively Arts (with Ben Hecht, 1944)
- Hollywood Pinafore, or The Lad Who Loved a Salary (book and lyrics, 1945)
- Park Avenue (book, with Nunnally Johnson, 1946)
- Bravo! (with Edna Ferber, 1948)
- The Small Hours (with Leueen MacGrath, 1951)
- Fancy Meeting You Again (with Leueen MacGrath, 1952)
- The Solid Gold Cadillac (with Howard Teichmann, 1953)
- Silk Stockings (book, with Leueen MacGrath and Abe Burrows, 1955)

=== Film ===
- Roman Scandals (original story, 1933)
- A Night at the Opera (with Morrie Ryskind, 1935)
- The Senator Was Indiscreet (director, 1947)

== Awards ==
Awarding institution	Award title	Year	Production	Results	Notes
Pulitzer Prize	Pulitzer Prize for Drama	1932	Of Thee I Sing	Won	Won award in collaboration of Morris Ryskind, Ira Gershwin
Pulitzer Prize	Pulitzer Prize for Drama	1937	You Can't Take It With You	Won	Award won in collaboration with Moss Hart
Tony Awards	Tony Award for Best Direction of a Musical	1951	Guys and Dolls	Won	

== See also ==
- List of 20th century playwrights from the United States
