= Beatrice Kaufman =

American editor, writer, and playwright

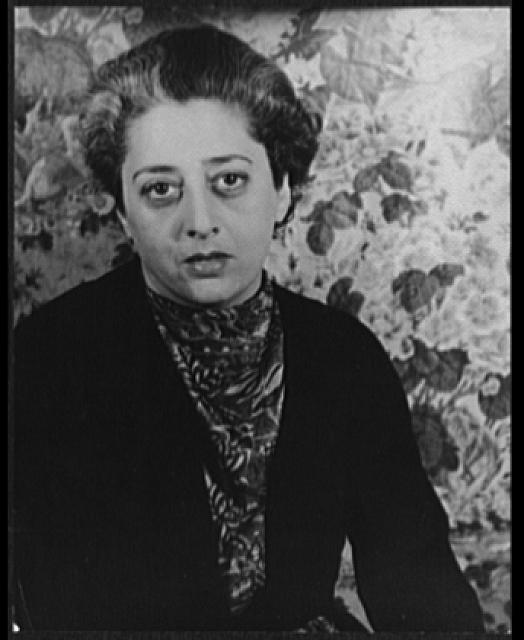
Beatrice Kaufman in 1934

Beatrice Bakrow Kaufman (January 20, 1895 – October 6, 1945) was an American editor, writer, and playwright. Although chiefly remembered as the wife of director, humorist, and playwright George S. Kaufman, she had a distinguished literary career of her own, and during the 1930s and 1940s, was regarded as "one of the wittiest women in New York" who was "influential in shaping American taste and culture in the early twentieth century".

== Early life ==
Kaufman was born Beatrice Bakrow in Rochester, New York in 1895. Her parents, Julius and Sarah (Adler) Bakrow, were of German Jewish heritage. She had two brothers, Leonard and Julian. Although she was admitted to Wellesley College in 1913—a rare accomplishment, at the time, for a Jewish woman—she was expelled during her first year for breaking curfew. She transferred to the University of Rochester in 1914, but dropped out after one year. In 1917 she married George S. Kaufman, a theatre reporter for the New York Tribune, and an aspiring playwright; the couple moved to New York City, where they lived for the rest of her life.

== Career ==
=== Editing ===
In 1918, Kaufman began her career as an assistant to the press agent for silent movie actresses Natalie, Constance, and Norma Talmadge. In 1919, their daughter Anne was born. After a stint the following year as a play reader for Broadway producer Al Woods, Kaufman joined the publishing company Boni & Liveright. During her five years as head of its editorial department, she edited works by important novelists, poets, and playwrights, including T.S. Eliot, William Faulkner, e.e. cummings, John Steinbeck, Eugene O’Neill, Djuna Barnes, and eventually, her husband. She edited Ernest Hemingway's first published work—a collection of short stories titled In Our Time—and convinced her reluctant bosses to publish it.

In the 1930s, Kaufman served in various other editorial capacities, including fiction editor at Harper's Bazaar and Viking Press, and Eastern story editor for independent film producer Samuel Goldwyn. Her husband is said to have valued her opinion on his work more than anyone else. She was "always the first reader", she said, of his plays. "I say what I honestly think about them," she said. "Sometimes I'm listened to, sometimes I'm not."

=== Writing ===
While Kaufman was known principally for her editorial work, she wrote and published short stories, mostly in The New Yorker, and wrote two plays: Divided by Three (with Margaret Leech) and The White-Haired Boy (with Charles Martin), both of which were successfully produced.

== Social life ==
The Kaufmans enjoyed a reputation "for their sophistication, and their tempestuous relationship". Both were long-time members of the Algonquin Round Table, and were close friends with many of the most famous literary and entertainment luminaries of the period, including Moss Hart, Frank Sinatra, Yip Harburg, Ethel Merman, Helen Hayes, Irving Berlin, Alfred Lunt, Julius Tannen, Ruth Goetz, Fred Saidy, Russel Crouse, and all of the Round Table regulars.

Both became notorious for their extramarital infidelities. Author and playwright Howard Teichmann—George's collaborator, and later his biographer—wrote that "Beatrice started seeing men even before George started with women", and described Beatrice's predilection for younger men:

At one of the larger parties that she and George gave so regularly, Beatrice spotted an attractive young man. There were several bedrooms in the Kaufman apartment, but none seemed appropriate. Stepping out, she and the young man went to the Plaza Hotel, where he signed the register. The room clerk looked over this unlikely couple with no baggage and a single intention. The clerk told the young man that there were no rooms available. When the young man told her this, Beatrice walked up to the desk and exclaimed: "See here, I am Mrs. George S. Kaufman!" With this comment the clerk gave them a room.

George's most infamous affair, with the actress Mary Astor, became national news when Astor's husband, Franklin Thorpe, announced it to the press in 1934, during the couple's divorce proceedings. To reporters' requests for comment, Beatrice responded "I am not going to divorce Mr. Kaufman. Young actresses are an occupational hazard for any man working in the theatre." According to their friend Alexander King, "Beatrice was one of those great, daring women who knows that her husband is having extramarital relations and knows that everybody else knows it, and knows that this can be borne either by throwing fits in lobbies or by being Wife Number One. And she was Wife Number One."

Kaufman died at the age of 50 in their Park Avenue apartment on October 6, 1945 after several years of poor health. At the funeral, her grief-stricken husband told Russel Crouse "I'm finished. Through. I'll never write again."

== Famous quotes ==
“I’ve been rich, and I’ve been poor. Rich is better.” The quote is often attributed to Sophie Tucker, though there is no record of Tucker using it.
