= Act One (1963 film) =

1963 film by Dore Schary

- Directed by: Dore Schary
- Written by: Dore Schary
- Based on: Act One by Moss Hart
- Produced by: Dore Schary
- Starring: George Hamilton; Jason Robards; George Segal; Jack Klugman; Sam Levene; Ruth Ford; Eli Wallach
- Cinematography: Arthur J. Ornitz
- Edited by: Mort Fallick
- Music by: Skitch Henderson
- Production company: Dore Schary Productions
- Distributed by: Warner Bros. Pictures
- Release date: December 26, 1963 (US)
- Running time: 110 minutes
- Country: United States
- Language: English
- Budget: $1 million

Act One is a 1963 American drama film written and directed by Dore Schary, and starring George Hamilton. It is the film version of the 1959 autobiographical book Act One by playwright Moss Hart. A play based on the book premiered on Broadway in 2014.

George Hamilton later complained that "Schary de-ethnicized the entire production and took out the brilliance for good measure".

== Plot ==
In 1929, 25-year-old Brooklyn native Moss Hart lives with his parents and works through the summer so he can devote the winter months to writing plays. He is encouraged by his friend Joe Hyman, who provides both moral support and occasional financial assistance.

Eventually, after four years and five attempts at serious drama, he takes the advice of agent Richard Maxwell and "discards the mantle of O'Neill and Ibsen and Shaw" to write a comedy, Once in a Lifetime. Inspired by the newspaper headline "Talkies sweep Hollywood", the play satirizes the Hollywood film industry's painful transition to sound. Hart's knowledge of the subject comes from immersing himself for months in "the pages of Variety, the fan magazines and Louella Parsons' column."

Producer Warren Stone (a fictional version of Jed Harris) keeps him waiting all day, then tells him to leave the manuscript and return. Eventually they meet, and Stone mesmerizes Hart with his talk of what it means to be a playwright. When months pass without any word, Hart's friends sneak a copy of the play to Sam Harris, who agrees to produce it if George Kaufman will collaborate and direct. Kaufman agrees, and so begins a partnership that will last until 1941.

The Atlantic City opening is a failure. Hart is distraught and Kaufman tells Hart that he has gone dry. Hart spends the day at the beach and comes to Kaufman with his new ideas for the second and third acts. Hart moves into Kaufman's house and they spend the summer reworking the play. It finally opens to rave reviews in New York City in September 1930. On opening night, Kaufman steps forward at the curtain call and says "80% of this play is Moss Hart." Hart returns to his family in the rain, announces that they are all moving, and says goodbye to their old place in his own way.

== Cast ==
- George Hamilton as Moss Hart
- Jason Robards as George S. Kaufman
- Jack Klugman as Joe Hyman
- Sam Levene as Richard Maxwell
- Ruth Ford as Beatrice Kaufman
- Eli Wallach as Warren Stone (Jed Harris)
- George Segal as Lester Sweyd
- Joseph Leon as Max Siegel
- Martin Wolfson as Mr. Hart
- Sam Groom as David Starr (Dore Schary)
- Sammy Smith as Sam H. Harris
- Louise Larabee as Clara Baum
- David Doyle as Oliver Fisher
- Jonathan Lippe as Teddy Manson
- Bert Convy as Archie Leach (Cary Grant)
- Sylvie Straus as Mrs. Hart
- Arno Selco as Bernie Hart
- Allen Leaf as Harry
- Lulu B. King as Maid
- Earl Montgomery as Alexander Woollcott
- Bill Desmond as George Jean Nathan
- Joe Demar as Heywood Broun
- Drummond Erskine as Franklin P. Adams
- Kenneth Mars as Robert E. Sherwood
- Roger C. Carmel as Hotel Clerk (uncredited)

== Production background ==
Film rights were bought by Warner Bros. Pictures, who assigned George Axelrod to write the script. Eventually the project went to Dore Schary, who had known Hart for a number of years.

"I've tried to deal with Moss as I knew him", said Schary. "The film is more about character than the theatrical world. But I think his story represents more than just a guy trying to succeed in a tough, creative field, It's about his frustrations in trying to reach a dream, and then it isn't what he expected when he gets there. You might call it a typical American theme."

Dore Schary was the basis for the character David Starr (played by Sam Groom).

Anthony Perkins and Dean Jones were early contenders for role of Moss Hart.

George Hamilton was socially friendly with the family of Moss Hart, and Hart reportedly wanted Hamilton for the role.

== Release ==
To promote the upcoming release of Act One, George Hamilton appeared on a September 1963 episode of I've Got a Secret, a prime-time game show in which a panel of celebrities attempted to discover the guest's "secret". Hamilton's secret? The actor identified as Hamilton and grilled by the panel (who failed to guess his secret) was that he was not actually Hamilton at all but instead a dark-haired handsome sort-of-look-alike pretending to be Hamilton. The real Hamilton showed up at the end of the spot and earned the admiration of panelist Henry Morgan who expressed astonishment that any performer of Hamilton's stature was secure enough to take part in a stunt which, in essence, pointed up the fact that he was unrecognizable to a quartet of supposedly in-the-know celebrities.

== Reception ==
Kitty Carlisle, Hart's widow, was unhappy with the film. When Schary showed it to her she said diplomatically "Well, you did it", and later she said "we draw a veil" over the film. In 1997, she "expressed her disapproval in the April 5 New York Times, saying that she attempted to buy the film 'to get it off the market.' "

James Woolcott wrote about the film in Vanity Fair:

Act One has a very '50s feel, more of a boxy affinity with the Golden Age of TV than anything released in a film canister. It abbreviates the birth pangs and floor-pacing agonies of Once in a Lifetime's gestation, the torturous rounds of re-writes and previews, sugarcoating everything about the romance of the theater that All About Eve had salted and pickled ... Hamilton isn't that bad, but playing an underdog of raging literal and metaphorical appetite, he purrs as a screen presence, his matinee-idol profile belying his character's self-doubt. Nothing needy thumps around inside him. (Had Act One been made a decade later, Richard Dreyfuss would have been perfect.) What makes this Act One work are the crafty scene-stealers cast against Hamilton's ingenuous Hart: Eli Wallach... Jack Klugman... and, most of all, Jason Robards as George S. Kaufman. With high-top hair, skeptical eyebrows that lift like Groucho Marx's, and a resigned posture suggesting a body that's a dried rind, Robards's Kaufman is an Al Hirschfeld caricature come to life. Wallach, Klugman, and Robards—each had a distinctive grain to his voice, a variable velocity in his delivery. The contrast between these shrewd operators and the freshman crew playing Hart's smart-aleck pals—among them future star George Segal as Hart's personal prophet of doom—gives the movie its rustling texture as a Hollywood artifact, nearly everybody in it destined for greater glories on-screen.,,

Stephen Vagg argued in Filmink:

Hamilton tries, but Schary gets him to play it in Dore Schary style – polite, well-mannered, conscientious – and he’s never convincing as a young struggling Hart. Too handsome. Too unlike a writer. Hamilton would’ve been perfect for the late period Hart – a darling of the social scene, well dressed, sophisticated – but not a young man on the make, he’s got no energy or chutzpah – George Segal, who plays Hart’s jealous friend, would’ve been better. But even Segal would have struggled under Schary.

== Technical Error ==
In the opening scene, set in September 1929, Hart turns on his radio to listen to a news report by Jimmy Wallington. One of the stories features an error as Wallington reports "Colonel Theodore Roosevelt returned to New York yesterday from a 10-month expedition in China...the former President was in excellent spirits..." This would have been impossible as President Roosevelt died 10 years earlier. However, his sons Theodore Roosevelt III (a brigadier general in the Army) and Kermit Roosevelt did, in fact, make a 10-month expedition to China between 1928 and 1929.
