= The Fabulous Invalid =

1938 play by George S. Kaufman and Moss Hart

- Original language: English
- Written by: George S. Kaufman; Moss Hart

Premiere
- Date: October 8, 1938
- Place: Broadhurst Theatre; New York City

The Fabulous Invalid is a 1938 stage play by George S. Kaufman and Moss Hart following the oscillating fortunes of a fictitious Broadway theater, the Alexandria, in the period between 1900 and 1930. The play's title has since entered the vernacular as a synonym for the theater.

== Production history ==
In 1937, Moss Hart conceived the notion for The Fabulous Invalid after acquiring hundreds of back issues of Theatre magazine and immersing himself in the magazine's documentation of a vanished theatrical era. With his frequent collaborator George S. Kaufman, Hart began to develop an historical pageant that traced the evolution of the American theater from the 1700s to the present, potentially starring Alfred Lunt and Lynn Fontanne. (When told of the project, Lunt was reportedly most excited about the prospect of wearing blackface in a section devoted to minstrel shows.) Kaufman and Hart soon scotched the project due to structural issues; upon further research, they also discovered "that the early days of the American theatre were not permeated with much apparent romance and that the plays then produced were appallingly and incredibly dull."

In the spring of 1938, the team revived the idea in a scaled-down form, deciding that it would follow the fortunes of a single Broadway theatre, the fictitious Alexandria, during the 30-year period between 1900 and 1930. Over the course of the play, the Alexandria devolves from a legitimate playhouse to a movie theater to a burlesque hall before it is climactically rescued from the wrecking ball by a young repertory company that resembles the Mercury Theatre. The passage of time in The Fabulous Invalid is illustrated by a Living Newspaper-style cavalcade of scenes from 26 plays and musicals, including Captain Jinks of the Horse Marines (1901) by Clyde Fitch, Little Johnny Jones (1904) by George M. Cohan, The Lion and the Mouse (1905) by Charles Klein, Within the Law (1912) by Bayard Veiller, Anna Christie (1921) by Eugene O'Neill, and What Price Glory? (1924) by Maxwell Anderson and Laurence Stallings; actors recreated the performances of legendary stage stars such as Ethel Barrymore, Minnie Maddern Fiske, and Elsie Janis.

The Fabulous Invalid opened on Broadway on October 8, 1938 at the Broadhurst Theatre with a 73-person cast that included Richard Gordon, Doris Dalton, Stephen Courtleigh, Jack Norworth, and Ernest Lawford. The Washington Post deemed the play "too obvious to be affecting," and while The New York Times' Brooks Atkinson praised Kaufman and Hart's ambition and the sumptuousness of the physical production, he ultimately dismissed it as "a ponderous show that reaffirms the commonplace." The Fabulous Invalid closed on December 3, 1938 after 65 performances. The play has never been revived on Broadway, and Hart later described it as "unmourned and over-sentimental."

Chock full o'Nuts was mentioned disparagingly in the play, prompting the company to sue Kaufman and Hart for $24,500 in damages. The suit was dismissed, partly because Kaufman and Hart told the judge that they had previously satirized the likes of Franklin D. Roosevelt and George V without incident.

In 2003, a revised version of The Fabulous Invalid was produced at Emerson College; the playwright Jeffrey Hatcher reworked the text to encompass the 100-year history of Boston's Cutler Majestic Theatre, and the production featured Alice Ripley and Steve Hendrickson as two of the theater's "ghosts."

== Legacy ==
Kaufman and Hart coined the phrase "the fabulous invalid" to describe the resilience of the theater despite continual pronouncements of its demise. In 1940, The New York Times referred to it as "a fond phrase that will probably stick," and the phrase has indeed entered the vernacular. In his 2001 biography of Hart, Steven Bach wrote that the play's title was "the most enduring thing about it."
