= Abe Burrows =

American writer, director and humorist (1910–1985)

- Burrows on Match Game in 1977.
- Born: Abram Solman Borowitz; December 18, 1910; New York City, U.S.
- Died: May 17, 1985 (aged 74); New York City, U.S.
- Education: City College of New York; New York University
- Occupations: Writer, composer, librettist, director, humorist
- Spouses: Ruth Levinson (m. 1938; div. 1948) Carin Smith Kinzel (m. 1950)
- Children: 2, including James Burrows

Abe Burrows (born Abram Solman Borowitz; December 18, 1910 – May 17, 1985) was an American writer, composer, humorist, director for radio and the stage, and librettist for Broadway musicals. His versatile career in radio, Broadway, and television spanned many decades. He is best known for co-writing the book to the award-winning musicals Guys and Dolls and How to Succeed in Business Without Really Trying.

== Early years ==
Born Abram Solman Borowitz in New York City, Burrows graduated from New Utrecht High School in Brooklyn and later attended City College and New York University. While at NYU, he began working as a runner on Wall Street. Eventually he quit college and devoted himself full time to Wall Street where he remained five years in a variety of clerical jobs.

Throughout most of the 1930s, Burrows struggled to earn a living. He worked in an accounting firm, sold maple syrup, and took a job in his father's wallpaper-and-paint business. His entry into the entertainment world occurred in 1938 when he met a young comic writer named Frank Gaylen. The two started collaborating on nightclub acts, comedy sketches, and radio scripts. They also sold jokes to an impressionist who appeared on Rudy Vallée's radio show, and from there Burrows was able to gain a foothold in radio.

== Career ==
=== Radio ===
His big break came when he began working with Ed Gardner, the writer and star of radio's legendary sitcom, Duffy's Tavern. The two created the successful show after Gardner's character, Archie, had premiered on This Is New York, an earlier radio program. In 1941, Burrows was made the head writer of Duffy's Tavern, and he later credited that experience with helping him invent the Runyonesque street characters for Guys and Dolls. "The people on that show," Burrows once said about Duffy's Tavern, "were New York mugs, nice mugs, sweet mugs, and like (Damon) Runyon's mugs they all talked like ladies and gentlemen. That's how we treated the characters in Guys and Dolls."

Burrows also wrote for Danny Kaye's short-lived mid-1940s radio comedy show, helping head writer Goodman Ace fashion material for Kaye and co-stars Eve Arden and Lionel Stander. He quit Duffy's Tavern in 1945 to work at Paramount Pictures but soon returned to radio. As a guest on The Henry Morgan Show in 1947, Burrows performed "I'll Bet You're Sorry Now, Tokyo Rose, Sorry for What You Done."

Meanwhile, he became a popular guest on the Hollywood party circuit, performing his own satirical songs ("Darling Why Shouldn't You Look Well Fed, ‘Cause You Ate Up a Hunka My Heart?" and "The Girl with the Three Blue Eyes"). Such informal performances led to a nightclub act and regular appearances as a performer on CBS radio programs, and to his eventually hosting his own radio program on CBS Radio from 1947 to 1949, a 15-minute weekly comedy that Burrows wrote and directed as well.

As he recalled years later, his show came about while he was scripting a radio program for Joan Davis when George Jessel asked him, "When the hell are you gonna become a professional?" Burrows continued as Davis' head writer while doing his own show. Mixing comic patter ("I guess I could tell you exactly what I look like, but I think that's a lousy thing to say about a guy") with his clever comic songs, The Abe Burrows Show was popular with listeners and critics but not with its sponsor, Lambert Pharmaceutical, then the makers of Listerine mouthwash, but promoting a Listerine toothpaste on the show. Lambert, according to Burrows, complained that the show wasn't selling much of the toothpaste. "It seems that my fans were being naughty," he wrote. "While they were laughing at my jokes, they were sneering at my toothpaste."

The New York Public Library holds the Abe Burrows papers, which include complete runs of both The Abe Burrows Show (CBS, 1947–48) and Breakfast with Burrows (CBS, 1949), as well as appearances on other radio shows.

Both of Burrows' radio shows originated from KNX, CBS's Los Angeles affiliate, whose program director Ernie Martin encouraged Burrows, who had done some film work, to think about writing plays. "I told him I felt my funny stuff was okay for radio, but I didn't think people would pay theater prices to hear it," Burrows recalled.

=== Broadway ===
Burrows credited his success in the theatre to his work under the theatre legend George S. Kaufman. In the Kaufman biography by Howard Teichmann, Burrows is quoted as saying that what he said (as a director, to his cast) was what he heard Kaufman say in their collaboration on Guys and Dolls.

Eventually, Burrows wrote, doctored, or directed such shows as Make a Wish, Two on the Aisle, Three Wishes for Jamie, Say, Darling, Guys and Dolls, How to Succeed in Business Without Really Trying, Cactus Flower, Four on a Garden, Can-Can, Silk Stockings, Breakfast at Tiffany's, Good News (1974 revival), and many others. With his collaborator Frank Loesser, Burrows won a Pulitzer Prize for How to Succeed in Business Without Really Trying.

Burrows wrote and directed the first Broadway musical version of a Jane Austen novel, First Impressions, a rewriting of Pride and Prejudice. The show, which ran for 84 performances in 1959, is widely described as a flop. Burrows thought that critics panned the show because they wondered why a comedy guy was taking on "tired period drama," but the script shows some unusual choices. Burrows had his version of heroine Elizabeth Bennet decide to join forces with her marriage-hungry mother in order to snag hero Mr. Darcy.

Burrows also became a famous script doctor, enough so that the desperate remark of a producer, "Get me Abe Burrows!", remained for many years Broadway shorthand for a script that needed repair. Yet Burrows himself downplayed that role in his memoir, and discussed his fixing of Make a Wish:

I have... performed surgery on a few shows, but not as many as I'm given credit for. I've been involved in 19 theatrical productions, plus their road company offshoots. Only a few of these have been surgical patients. And I don't usually talk about them. I feel that a fellow who doctors a show should have the same ethical approach that a plastic surgeon has. It wouldn't be very nice if a plastic surgeon were walking down the street with you, and a beautiful girl approached. And you say, "What a beautiful girl." And the plastic surgeon says, "She was a patient of mine. You should have seen her before I fixed her nose." Doctoring seldom cures a show. The sickness usually starts at the moment the author puts the first sheet of paper in his typewriter. All the redirecting and recasting can never help much if the basic story is wrong.

=== HUAC testimony ===
Burrows' career in show business was imperiled in the early 1950s by the Hollywood blacklist. Although he had been named as a Communist to the House Un-American Activities Committee (HUAC) in October 1952 by former radio program director Owen Vinson, Burrows was a target before then. In 1951, he was the apparent winner of the Pulitzer Prize for Drama for Guys and Dolls. But due to pressure from the HUAC, no Pulitzer for Drama was awarded that year. The Trustees of Columbia University exercised their right of veto in order to not give Burrows the award.

Burrows and his wife (writer-actor-director Carin Smith Kinzel) realized they were in political jeopardy, and so they hired Martin Gang, known as the best "clearance lawyer" in Hollywood. Gang counseled his clients to be fully cooperative with the HUAC, including by "naming names". When Burrows testified to the committee in November 1952, he agreed to be an informer but was somewhat evasive in his testimony. For example, he said that while others might have considered him a Communist, "in my own heart, I didn't believe it." Nevertheless, because of the prior arrangement Gang had made with the HUAC, and because Burrows was friendly and cooperative during questioning, he was able to avoid the blacklist. When Mrs. Burrows testified in May 1953, she was more forthright than her husband. She admitted to being a Communist Party member from 1940 to 1946. She renounced her past, named twenty others as Communists, and was cleared by the committee.

=== Television ===
Over the course of three decades, Burrows was a regular panelist on programs such as This Is Show Business, What's My Line?, To Tell the Truth, and Match Game 77, all on CBS. He also appeared on Call My Bluff on NBC. Despite his many achievements on radio and the Broadway stage, for most Americans, Burrows was known as a witty guest who appeared countless times on TV game shows.

He also guest-starred on CBS's Faye Emerson's Wonderful Town when the television series visited The Bronx in October 1952. He was the co-creator, and sometimes writer and director, of the ABC television series O.K. Crackerby!. He produced the television series Abe Burrows' Almanac in 1950, and The Big Party in 1959.

=== Other accomplishments ===
Burrows wrote the screenplay for the 1956 film The Solid Gold Cadillac.

He showcased his skills as a composer on albums for Decca and Columbia, including:

- The Girl with the Three Blue Eyes and other typical type songs (1947, Decca A-607), 10-inch 78 rpm, reissued on 10-inch LP (1950, Decca DL 5288)
- Abe Burrows Sings? (1950, Columbia), with orchestra under the direction of Milton DeLugg, 10-inch LP
- Fun House! (1959, Harmony Records), various artists, includes Boulder Dam by Burrows

In 1980, he published his memoir, Honest, Abe: Is There Really No Business Like Show Business?, in which he recounts his experiences and accomplishments in the entertainment industry. He describes how he mentored several successful comedy writers and comedians, such as future M*A*S*H and Tootsie writer Larry Gelbart (who was once a Duffy's Tavern writer), Nat Hiken, Dick Martin, and Woody Allen, who was a distant cousin of Burrows.

== Personal life and death ==
He was married twice. His son, James Burrows, became an influential television director whose credits included The Mary Tyler Moore Show and Cheers. His daughter, Laurie Burrows Grad, is the author of four cookbooks and hosted her own cooking show on The Learning Channel.

Abe Burrows died from Alzheimer's disease in his native New York City.

== Abe Burrows Award ==
Since 2024 the Stage Directors and Choreographers Foundation has awarded an annual Abe Burrows Award of $10,000 to one or more assistant directors, in Burrows' honor. The award recognises that Burrows "cared deeply about fostering and supporting the next generation of directors" and is supported by the James and Deborah Burrows Foundation and Thomas Kail.

=== Winners ===
- 2025: Mack Brown and Tai Thompson
- 2024: Violeta Picayo and Sharifa Yazmeen
