= Gothic (film) =

- Theatrical release poster
- Directed by: Ken Russell
- Screenplay by: Stephen Volk
- Story by: Lord Byron; Percy Bysshe Shelley
- Produced by: Penny Corke
- Starring: Gabriel Byrne; Julian Sands; Natasha Richardson; Timothy Spall
- Cinematography: Mike Southon
- Edited by: Michael Bradsell
- Music by: Thomas Dolby
- Production company: Virgin Films
- Distributed by: Virgin Films
- Release date: 30 November 1986 (London Film Festival)
- Running time: 87 minutes
- Country: United Kingdom
- Language: English
- Budget: GBP$4.5 million or £2 million
- Box office: USD$916,172 (United States)

Gothic is a 1986 British psychological horror film directed by Ken Russell, starring Gabriel Byrne as Lord Byron, Julian Sands as Percy Bysshe Shelley, Natasha Richardson as Mary Shelley, Myriam Cyr as Claire Clairmont and Timothy Spall as Dr. John William Polidori. It features a soundtrack by Thomas Dolby, and marks Richardson and Cyr's film debut.

The film is a fictionalized retelling of the Shelleys' visit to Lord Byron in Villa Diodati by Lake Geneva, shot in Gaddesden Place. It concerns their competition to write a horror story, which ultimately led to Mary Shelley writing Frankenstein and John Polidori writing "The Vampyre." The same event has also been portrayed in the films Mary Shelley (with Elle Fanning as Mary Shelley), Haunted Summer (1988) (with Alice Krige as Mary Shelley) among others, and alluded to in Bride of Frankenstein (1935) (with Elsa Lanchester as Mary Shelley and the Bride of the Monster).

The film's poster motif is based on Henry Fuseli's 1781 painting The Nightmare, which is also referenced in the film.

== Plot ==
Through her stepsister Claire Clairmont, Mary Godwin and her future husband Percy Shelley come to know Lord Byron. During the summer of 1816, Lord Byron invites them to stay for a while at Villa Diodati in Switzerland. There they meet Byron's physician friend, Dr. John Polidori. On 16 June, while a storm rages outside, the five of them amuse themselves by engaging in a game of hide-and-seek. Later in a parlor, Percy proclaims his fascination with science; Polidori tells him of his interests in sleepwalking and nightmares. Lord Byron shows his guests Fantasmagoriana, a book of horror stories he purchased from a shop in Geneva, and the three alternately read excerpts. This inspires them to hold a séance gathered around a human skull, during which Claire has an apparent seizure. Mary describes them as Claire's "horrors," and recalls instances during their childhood when unexplained phenomena would occur during them, such as Claire's bed inexplicably shaking, and doors slamming shut by themselves. Polidori brings Claire upstairs to rest.

During the night, Mary witnesses a shadowy apparition outside the window she and Claire share. Believing Mary was startled by a slamming barn door outside, Percy goes to shut it. While investigating the barn, he is startled by a grotesque creature. Mary speaks with Lord Byron in the billiard room, confronting him about his intentions with Claire, and reveals to him that Claire is pregnant with his child. He suggests she have an abortion, and the two argue, resulting in a physical confrontation.

Later, Lord Byron performs oral sex on Claire, during which she has a miscarriage. Meanwhile, Mary consoles Percy, who has grown increasingly paranoid and claims to smell an overpowering scent of decay. From the bottom of the staircase, Mary hears a noise, and feels liquid dripping on her. As she looks up, she sees Polidori leaning over the banister, clutching a bleeding wound on his neck. Once the bleeding is controlled, he claims to have been bitten by a vampire in his room. Byron accuses him of self-inflicting the wounds, while Percy and Mary believe him. Percy raves that the group collectively gave birth to something during the séance, manifesting their worst fears, while Polidori fears damnation for his homosexuality. He attempts to fatally poison himself with cyanide, but is stopped by Byron.

Claire goes missing from her bedroom and is discovered by Percy, who watches in horror as her breasts metamorphose into eyes. Mary attempts to flee the house and inadvertently crashes through a glass door. Percy infers that the presence haunting them is feeding off of the group's fear. During a failed attempt to hang himself in the barn, Polidori witnesses a figure flee on horseback. Percy and Byron attempt to recreate the séance to banish their creation. Byron and Percy, both atheists, believe it must be returned to the recesses of their minds, while Mary questions the metaphysical and supernatural events plaguing them.

In the basement, the three discover Claire nude and covered in mud. Byron attempts to hold the séance there, but Mary refuses. During the event, Mary crushes the skull, and attempts to stab Byron with a shard. Percy stops her, and begins kissing Byron passionately. As she flees through the home, Mary witnesses an apparition of her son, William, in a coffin, followed by a vision of her suffering a miscarriage. In the madness, she attempts to throw herself off a balcony, but is stopped by Percy. Mary awakens the following morning and joins Byron, Percy, and Claire in the garden.

In the contemporary era, tourists visit the Villa. A voice-over informs that Mary's son, William, died three years after that night in June 1816, followed by Percy's drowning in 1822; Byron would die two years after Percy, and Polidori committed suicide in London. From Mary's previous experience of miscarriage came the desire to raise her child from the dead, which led to her writing Frankenstein. From Polidori's homosexuality, suicidal thoughts, and fascination with vampires came the story "The Vampyre."

== Cast ==
- Gabriel Byrne as Lord Byron
- Julian Sands as Percy Bysshe Shelley
- Natasha Richardson as Mary Shelley
- Myriam Cyr as Claire Clairmont
- Timothy Spall as Dr. John William Polidori
- Alec Mango as Murray
- Andreas Wisniewski as Fletcher
- Dexter Fletcher as Ruston
- Tom Hickey as Tour Guide

== Basis in reality ==
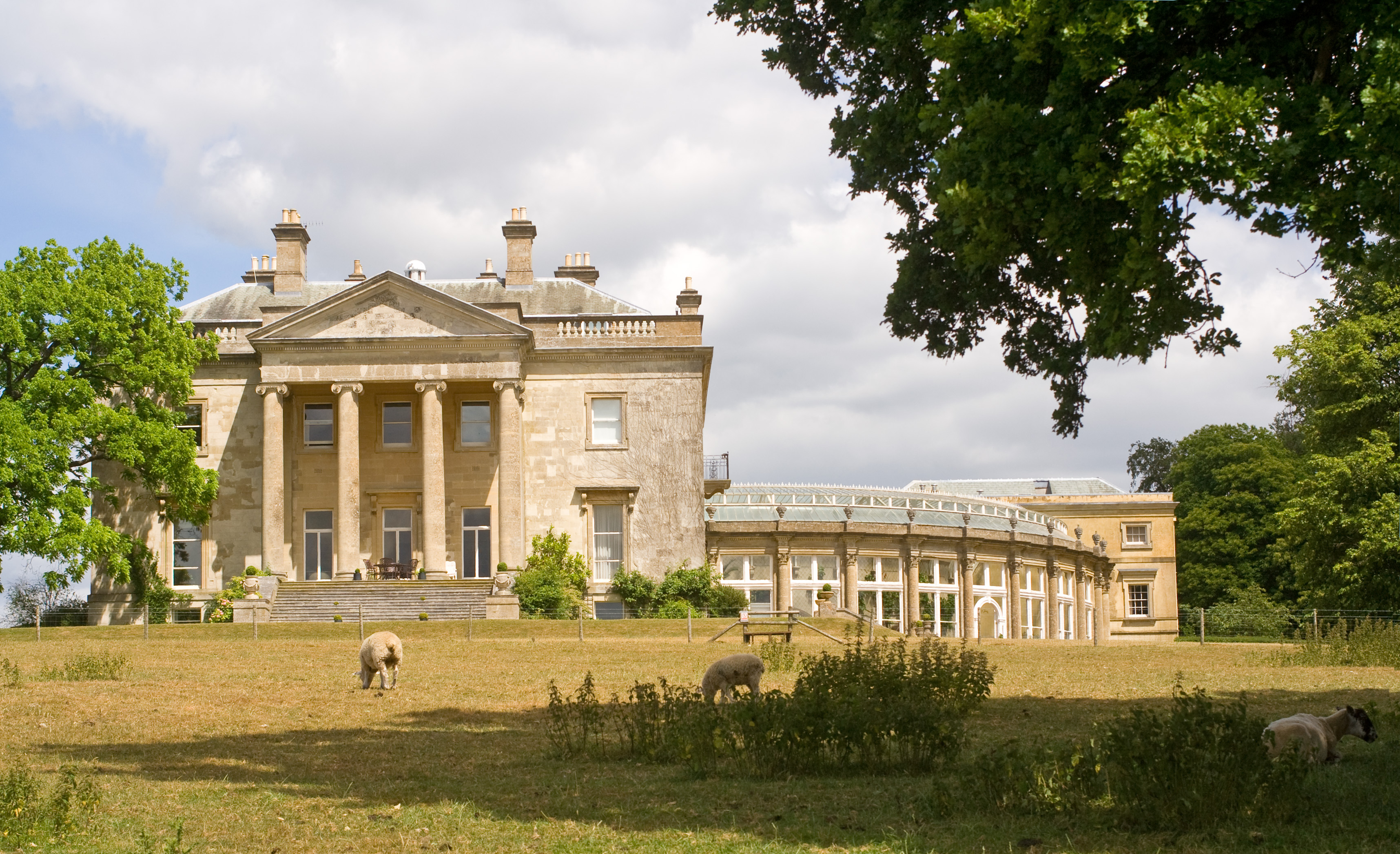
Gaddesden Place in Hertfordshire, England, was used as a location for Villa Diodati

The film fictionalizes an actual meeting that took place between Mary Godwin, Percy Shelley, and Claire Clairemont at the Villa Diodati in Geneva, hosted by Lord Byron. It has been suggested by some historians and journalists that the events of their meeting which inspired Shelley's Frankenstein and Polidori's "The Vampyre" were triggered by the group's use of opium during their vacation together. Discussing the film's basis in reality, actor Sands commented:

I think these portraits are rooted in reality. If people think otherwise, it's because of the later Victorian whitewash of them. These were not simply beautiful Romantic poets. They were subversive, anarchic hedonists pursuing a particular line of amorality. The film portrays Lord Byron as demonic and Shelley as on the verge of madness, but the film is an expressionist piece, and that's not an unreasonable expression of their realities.

The film implies that Shelley's Frankenstein was inspired by the loss of her child; film historian Robert Shail wrote that Gothic's "baroque visuals can't disguise the dubious nature of Russell's premise that the book was inspired by the author's loss of a baby."

== Production ==
=== Development ===
The film was based on a screenplay by Stephen Volk, who worked in advertising. He sent it to Al Clark, head of Virgin Films. Clark said "it was worlds removed from the scripts that one predominantly gets in this country, with their literary ambience and dependence on a sort of linguistic authenticity. I felt it offered a perfect springboard to a director."

After seeing Crimes of Passion, Clark offered the film to Ken Russell, who then accepted. Volk admits to having "slight misgivings" when Clark mentioned Russell's name, "But when I met Ken, I found, somehow to my surprise, that he was very easy to get on with". Russell worked on a further draft of the script with Volk which made relatively minor changes.

Russell had been interested in Byron and Shelley's meeting for a decade. He said, "About 10 years ago, Robert Powell, the actor, approached me with a script covering the same time span and events. But we couldn't raise the money. I think it was a little too poetic and not as scary as it might have been." Russell saw Gothic as "a sort of black comedy; some of the others have been slightly more serious. This has deliberate comic overtones, sort of a satire."

"I felt pretty positive about the story when it was sent to me," said Russell. "It was extremely visual, which attracted me. And the use of laudanum gave me a springboard for my ideas."

"I made the film because I was offered a script," Russell later said. "Everything's there (in the film). They (the main characters) were responsible for publicizing the gothic experience. It's a watershed: From that meeting, everything seemed to go against them."

The film was announced in December 1985. Ken Russell had planned to make a version of Moll Flanders but that fell through. The film was a co production between America's Atlantic Entertainment Group and Britain's Virgin Films. The budget was around two million pounds.

=== Filming ===
Filming started in June 1986 and wound up in August. It took place at Hertfordshire, mostly in and around the Palladian mansion Wrotham Park, with a week's shooting in the Lake's District.

Julian Sands had recently made A Room with a View with James Ivory and compared that director with Russell saying, "If James Ivory had done a film about Shelley, it would be a much more lyrical and soothing piece of work, whereas Ken's treatment is much more symphonic and mesmerizing. With James Ivory you are on a carousel, but with Ken Russell you are on a roller coaster. James Ivory is like an Indian miniaturist, and Ken Russell is a graffiti artist. James Ivory is like an ornithologist watching his subjects with a pair of binoculars from afar, whereas Ken Russell is a big-game hunter filming in the middle of a rhino charge."

Natasha Richardson found shooting difficult. "I myself was sort of shattered by the end. It became difficult to turn off and turn on. We'd get to the umpteenth take, and I just couldn't stop crying between takes."

The film's music score was written and recorded by the English new wave and synth-pop musician Thomas Dolby. "It was my first attempt to write orchestral music," Dolby said. "Ken was great to work with - he gave me lots of freedom. In fact, he just wanted everything louder!"

Dolby's score was released as the soundtrack album Music from the film Gothic in 1987. The album's closing track, "The Devil is an Englishman", was released as a single; credited to "Screamin' Lord Byron," the song features Timothy Spall reciting lyrics over Dolby's music and also includes vocal samples from Gothic.

== Release ==
The film had its world premiere at the London Film Festival.

The film was released in the United States by Vestron Pictures.

=== Marketing ===
The film received several theatrical posters as part of its promotional campaign; the original 1986 Virgin Films poster is an excerpt from Henry Fuseli's The Nightmare (1781), which is also depicted in the film. A second poster, based on the Fuseli painting, features Natasha Richardson lying over a bed with a goblin-like creature perched on her chest (an image which is also depicted in the film).

The poster artwork was deemed controversial at the time of the film' release, as noted by Derek Malcom, writing for The Guardian:

The poster has a naughty-looking goblin perching on the elegant chest of Natasha Richardson and Virgin Films have been told that it is not acceptable. So they have airbrushed the goblin out, leaving Natasha looking more relaxed but a little uncertain as to what is happening to her. All this seems rather silly since ... it is a pretty exact pastiche of a well-known Fuseli painting that's been perverting visitors to the Tate for some years.

=== Box office ===
Gothic premiered at the 30th BFI London Film Festival on 30 November 1986.

It received a limited theatrical release in the United States on 10 April 1987, grossing $32,061 on its opening weekend; it went on to gross a total of $916,172.

However, according to Dan Ireland, who later worked with Russell, the film was a financial success on video. Vestron, the company who distributed the film on video, signed Russell to a three-picture contract which ensured him financing for the rest of the decade. Russell said the film gave his career a "second wind" after he thought "he had had it."

=== Critical reception ===
On Rotten Tomatoes, the film holds an approval rating of 60% based on 15 reviews, with a weighted average rating of 6.0/10.

For the film's U.S. release, Vincent Canby of The New York Times wrote that the film "isn't always coherent, but it's as ghoulishly funny and frenzied as a carnival ride through The Marquis de Sade's Tunnel of Love," adding: "Don't go to Gothic expecting to be elevated. This is no reverie. It's a series of gaudy shock effects, an anthology of horror-film mannerisms that looks like a 60's LSD trip. If Gothic says anything about Byron, Shelley and their friends, it's just that anyone who trusted them with a summer rental had to be out of his mind." Desson Howe from The Washington Post wrote, "Beyond the carnalia... Gothic happens to be strikingly shot, the special effects inspired, albeit gruesome. Although he slops his signature blood 'n' cleavage across the screen, Russell makes it slick, with dynamic cutting, vivid lighting and framing. Who knows, you might spot a little humor in this hyperbolic lunacy. On the other hand, after a cinematic orgy like this, you might long for 15 minutes with an evangelist." Author and film critic Leonard Maltin awarded the film 2/4 stars, writing, "Too weird for some, too highbrow for many horror fans, but full of Russel's hallucinatory visuals."

On his website Ozus' World Movie Reviews, Dennis Schwartz graded the film a C+, criticizing the film's overwhelming silliness, dialogue, and tacky moments. Schwartz concluded his review by writing, "As far as I'm concerned, thank you, but no thank you, I'll take my Byron and Shelley straight." In his book The A–Z of Horror Films, Howard Maxford called the film "A relentlessly hysterical barrage of images in its director's most deplorable manner. Laughable when it isn't sickening."

Harlan Ellison praised the film saying:

Gothic is loopy and fatally flawed and an aberration. Yet I treasure this film. So may you. If you, as am I, are out of your head... you will cleave to this tortured bit of cinematic epilepsy because it is ALIVE. It is yet another crime of passion committed by Ken Russell, and his sort of berserk creativity has fallen on such hard times in this age of Reagan and yuppie sensibility, that simply to be exposed to the ravings of an inspired madman is cathartic. I came away from GOTHIC with my soul on fire... The final assertion of critical judgement on GOTHIC is not whether or not it is good, or whether one likes it or not. The undeniable truth of GOTHIC, as in all the work of Ken Russell (an artist who is either so mad or so foolhardy as not to care if he wins or loses), is that it is palpably ALIVE. It is riot and ruin and pandemonium. But it will have you by the nerve-ends.

Filmink argued "It’s basically a lot of people running around with weird stuff happening, but is superbly acted and consistently interesting (as so many Russell films were), and was a big hit on video."

=== Accolades ===
Gothic was nominated for three 1987 International Fantasy Film Awards and won two: Gabriel Byrne won as Best Actor, both for his role as Lord Byron in this film and for his role in Defence of the Realm, and the film won for Best Special Effects. Director Ken Russell was nominated for Best Film but did not win.
