= Drummond Erskine =

American actor

- Born: James Drummond Erskine III; April 7, 1919; Manhattan, New York City, United States
- Died: March 21, 2009 (aged 89)
- Occupation: Actor

James Drummond Erskine III (April 7, 1919 – March 21, 2009) was an American character actor. He appeared in more than 75 films during his decades long acting career, which spanned over 50 years.

Erskine became known in his later life for a series of cameo appearances on various television shows, including a running gag on the Late Show with David Letterman in which he parodied an aging Regis Philbin beginning in 2008.

== Biography ==
=== Early life ===
Erskine was born in 1919 in Manhattan. He attended private schools before enrolling at the University of Virginia.

Erskine left college at the beginning of World War II in order to enlist in the United States Army. He volunteered to serve in the Army's first airborne unit beginning in 1942. He was trained in the proper ways to jump and operate a glider at Fort Benning, Georgia. Erskine served in the Army as a trainer with the 506th Parachute Infantry Regiment, the same regiment which would later be the subject of Band of Brothers, a History Channel documentary. The 506th Regiment was based in Currahee Mountain, Georgia, during the war.

He suffered a broken hip in a maneuver jump accident in Tennessee and was told that he wouldn't be able to jump again. Erskine was able to recover and rejoin his Regiment in the European theater. Erskine participated in some of the largest battles of World War II, including the Battle of the Bulge.

Erskine left the U.S. Army after the end of World War II as a lieutenant colonel.

=== Career ===
Erskine worked for the Firestone Tire and Rubber Company in both the United States and Liberia following the end of the war. He simultaneously pursued his acting career while continuing to work for Firestone.

Erskine ultimately appeared in more than 75 films during his career, as well as many television and stage productions, over more than 50 years. Erskine once barely lost a role in a play to actor Charlton Heston, reportedly due to the dramatic way Heston descended a flight of stairs during casting. "He wouldn't just walk down the stairs – he'd leap," Erskine later remarked in an interview with Newsday.

He was often cast as Abraham Lincoln due to his "chiseled features", including a one-time appearance on the Alcoa Show during the 1950s.

Erskine again became known to viewers in 2008 when he appeared as an aging Regis Philbin on the Late Show with David Letterman.

Erskine had also worked for Guidepost magazine, an interfaith publication started by Norman Vincent Peale.

=== Death ===
Drummond Erskine died on March 21, 2009, at the age of 89. He was a resident of Cold Spring Harbor, New York, at the time.

Erskine was survived by his sister, Alison Farrar, of Lyme, New Hampshire, as well as three generations of nieces and nephews, who called him "Uncle Drummy." His memorial service was held at St. John's Episcopal Church in Cold Spring Harbor, New York.

== Filmography ==
Year	Title	Role	Notes
1963	Act One	Franklyn P. Adams	
1964	Light Fantastic		
1984	Nothing Lasts Forever	Lunarcruiser	
1986	F/X	Boathouse guard	
1986	Something Wild	Cafe Patron	Uncredited
1990	Backstreet Dreams	Policeman	
1992	Fathers & Sons	Jimmy	
1992	Noises Off	New York Backstage Doorman	
1999	Sweet and Lowdown	First Hobo	
1999	Kill by Inches	Old Marelewski	
2009	One Hundred Years of Evil	Lance Andersen	(final film role)
