= Myriam Cyr =

Canadian actress and writer

- Born: New Brunswick, Canada
- Occupations: Actress, director and writer
- Years active: 1986–present

Myriam Cyr is a Canadian actress and writer. As an actress she is best known for her roles as Claire Clairmont in the 1986 horror film Gothic and Ultra Violet in the 1996 biopic I Shot Andy Warhol. In 2006 she published the non-fiction work Letters of a Portuguese Nun: Uncovering the Mystery Behind a 17th Century Forbidden Love. In 2017, she co-wrote and directed the play Saltonstall's Trial set during the Salem witch trial.

== Selected filmography ==
Year	Film	Role
1986	Gothic	Claire Clairmont
1994	Jerome's Secret (Le Secret de Jérôme)	Juliette
1996	I Shot Andy Warhol	Ultra Violet
1996	Frankenstein and Me	Judy Williams
1998	Species II	Anne Sampas
1999	Kill by Inches	Vera Klamm

== Personal life ==
Myriam Cyr is mother of three. She has two sisters, including actress and singer Isabelle Cyr, and one brother. She has been married to her husband, Gifford West, for over twenty years.
