= Kill by Inches =

2001 film by Diane Doniol-Valcroze and Arthur Flam

- Kill by Inches theatrical poster
- Directed by: Diane Doniol-Valcroze; Arthur Flam
- Written by: Diane Doniol-Valcroze; Arthur Flam
- Produced by: Gill Holland
- Starring: Emmanuel Salinger; Myriam Cyr; Peter McRobbie
- Cinematography: Richard Rutkowski
- Edited by: Elizabeth Gazzara
- Music by: Geir Jenssen
- Distributed by: Fox Lorber; Phaedra Cinema; Sundance Channel
- Release date: September 12, 1999 (TIFF)
- Running time: 80 minutes
- Countries: United States; France
- Language: English

Kill by Inches is a 1999 independent film written and directed by Diane Doniol-Valcroze and Arthur Flam. The film premiered September 12, 1999 at the Toronto International Film Festival in the Discovery section. It opened in New York City on October 26, 2001.

== Plot ==
A deranged young tailor descends into madness and murder.

== Cast ==
- Emmanuel Salinger as Thomas Klamm
- Myriam Cyr as Vera Klamm
- Marcus Powell as The Father
- Chrisopher Zach as The Repairman
- Drummond Erskine as Old Marelewski
- Peter McRobbie as Ballroom Host
- Barrett Worland as Competitor #1
- David Fraioli as Competitor #2

== Festivals ==
- Canada: September 12, 1999 Toronto International Film Festival (World premiere)
- Norway: January 19, 2000 Tromso International Film Festival
- Belgium: March 24, 2000 Brussels International Festival of Fantasy Film
- United States: April 15, 2000 Los Angeles Film Festival (USA premiere)
- United States: April 28, 2000 Maryland Film Festival
- United States: June 10, 2000 Florida Film Festival
- Italy: June 28, 2000 Pesaro Film Festival

== Locations ==
- Conservatory Garden, Central Park, Manhattan, New York City, New York, USA
- Dumbo, Brooklyn, New York City, New York, USA
- Greenpoint, Brooklyn, New York City, New York, USA

== Voice over ==
Creepy poem over opening scene:

In the dead of winter,
at the Tailor's Parade,
a little boy was given
a pair of scissorblades,
for his father was a tailor.
"Go and steal our father's tape measure,"
said the sister to her brother,
and with the scissorblades,
the little boy cut up his father's tape measure...
But the old man saw
and took his boy by the neck
as the sister watched with delight,
her brother forced through the night
to keep his mouth wide open
and in agony swallow
every last piece of the tape measure,
inch by inch, down his throat,
till nothing was left.
