= Peter McRobbie =

Scottish-American actor (born 1943)

- Born: January 31, 1943 (age 83); Hawick, Scotland
- Education: Yale University
- Occupation: Actor
- Years active: 1975–present
- Known for: Boardwalk Empire
- Notable work: The Visit; World Trade Center; 16 Blocks; Brokeback Mountain; Bullets Over Broadway; Law & Order; Daredevil
- Spouse: Charlotte Bova (m. 1977)
- Children: 2

Peter McRobbie (born January 31, 1943) is a Scottish-American actor, best known for his roles as John C. Twist in the 2005 romantic drama film Brokeback Mountain, Mike Sheenan in the 2006 action film 16 Blocks, Pop Pop Jamison in the 2015 horror film The Visit, and Father Paul Lantom in Daredevil, as well as recurring roles in the TNT series The Alienist and as Judge Walter Bradley in the Law & Order franchise.

== Early life ==
McRobbie was born in Hawick, Scotland, the son of Mary Fleming (née Heigh), a writer, and William McRobbie, a storekeeper. He emigrated to the United States with his parents at a young age, settling in Milford, Connecticut.

McRobbie graduated from the Yale Drama School in 1966. He then studied in graduate school at the University of Tulsa for one year and studied acting with German-American actress Uta Hagen and actor James Saito at HB Studio in New York City.

From 1966 to 1968, McRobbie served in the United States Army at Fort Sill, Oklahoma, rising to the rank of Specialist 5.

== Career ==
McRobbie has appeared in more than 60 films and television series, including Spider-Man 2, Find Me Guilty, World Trade Center, 16 Blocks, Big, Shaft, Sleepers, and Bullets over Broadway. He had a recurring role on the TV series Law & Order: Special Victims Unit and the original Law & Order series. It was on these two shows that McRobbie has played perhaps his most famous role to date, Judge Walter Bradley. In 2000, he played the role of Father Felix in "From Where to Eternity", the 9th episode of the second season of The Sopranos, and again in 2001 in "Proshai, Livushka" the second episode of the third season of the HBO hit series. McRobbie also garnered wide attention for his portrayal of John C. Twist in the motion picture Brokeback Mountain (2005).

From 2010 to 2013 McRobbie played the role of FBI Supervisor Frederick Elliot in 9 episodes of the HBO hit series Boardwalk Empire. McRobbie portrayed George H. Pendleton in Lincoln (2012), as Lincoln's most virulent and snarling opponent in the House of Representatives in relation to the constitutional amendment outlawing slavery. He also appeared in the films Inherent Vice (2014), M. Night Shyamalan's The Visit (2015), and Steven Spielberg's Bridge of Spies (2015). From 2015 to 2018, McRobbie also portrayed Father Paul Lantom in the Marvel Cinematic Universe series Daredevil and The Defenders.

== Personal life ==
McRobbie married actress Charlotte Bova in 1977, and they have two children.

== Filmography ==
=== Film ===
| Year | Title | Role | Notes |
|---|---|---|---|
| 1980 | A Jury of Her Peers | County Attorney | Short film |
| 1983 | Zelig | Workers Rally Speaker | |
| 1985 | The Beniker Gang | Mr. Millhauser | |
| 1985 | The Purple Rose of Cairo | The Communist | |
| 1986 | The Manhattan Project | Electronics | |
| 1988 | Big | Executive #3 | |
| 1991 | Johnny Suede | Flip Doubt | |
| 1991 | Shadows and Fog | Bartender | |
| 1992 | School Ties | Chaplain | |
| 1994 | Bullets Over Broadway | Man At Theater | |
| 1995 | The Neon Bible | Reverend Watkins | |
| 1995 | Mighty Aphrodite | Linda's Ex-Landlord | |
| 1995 | Palookaville | Chief of Police | |
| 1996 | Big Night | Loan Officer | |
| 1996 | Sleepers | Lawyer | |
| 1996 | The Associate | Executive At Strip Club | |
| 1997 | Picture Perfect | Executive #2 | |
| 1997 | Deconstructing Harry | Damned Man | |
| 1998 | Jaded | Dr. Mancuso | |
| 1998 | Snake Eyes | FBI Agent Gordon Pritzker | |
| 1998 | Side Streets | Stelu | |
| 1998 | Celebrity | Father Gladden's Fan On Porch | |
| 1999 | The Adventures of Sebastian Cole | Principal | |
| 1999 | A Fish in the Bathtub | Father Malaccky | |
| 1999 | Kill by Inches | Ballroom Host | |
| 2000 | Small Time Crooks | Frenchy's Lawyer | |
| 2000 | Shaft | Lieutenant Cromartie | |
| 2001 | The American Astronaut | Lee Vilensky | |
| 2001 | Love the Hard Way | Prison Doctor | |
| 2004 | Spider-Man 2 | OsCorp Representative | |
| 2004 | Messengers | Stuart Quinn | |
| 2004 | Corn | Peder Gleck | |
| 2005 | Brokeback Mountain | John Twist | |
| 2005 | The Notorious Bettie Page | Gangel | |
| 2006 | Find Me Guilty | Peter Petraki | |
| 2006 | 16 Blocks | Mike Sheenan | |
| 2006 | World Trade Center | Allison's Father | |
| 2006 | The Hoax | George Gordon Holmes | |
| 2007 | Gracie | Principal Enright | |
| 2007 | Mercy | Tom | Short film |
| 2008 | The Understudy | Edward | |
| 2009 | Split Ends | Nathan Berry | |
| 2010 | Footsteps | Thaddeus | |
| 2011 | Dark Horse | Arnie | |
| 2012 | Lincoln | George H. Pendleton | |
| 2013 | The Immigrant | Dr. Knox | |
| 2013 | Chinese Puzzle | L'Agent Bureau Immigration | |
| 2014 | Aloft | Ike | |
| 2014 | Inherent Vice | Adrian Prussia | |
| 2015 | The Visit | Fredrick Spencer 'Pop-Pop' Jamison | |
| 2015 | Bridge of Spies | Allen Dulles | |
| 2017 | Ambition's Debt | Ciaus Cassius | |
| 2017 | Juggernaut | Leonard Gamble | |
| 2018 | Hold the Dark | Hunter John | |
| 2019 | Daniel Isn't Real | Percy Thigpen | |
| 2023 | Eileen | Warden | |

=== Television ===
| Year | Title | Role | Notes |
|---|---|---|---|
| 1981 | Nero Wolfe | Robert Cruidshank | Uncredited; Episode: "What Happened to April" |
| 1983 | Matt Houston | David | Episode: "The Beverly Woods Social Club" |
| 1985 | Izzy and Moe | Cop | Television film |
| 1985 | Doubletake | Sex Therapist | Television miniseries |
| 1988 | Crossbow | Anton | Episode: "Masterplan" |
| 1988 | In the Line of Duty: The F.B.I. Murders | FBI Special Agent John Hanlon | Television film |
| 1989 | A Man Called Hawk | Charlie | Episode: "Intensive Care" |
| 1989 | American Playhouse | Unknown | Episode: "Land of Little Rain" |
| 1990 | H.E.L.P. | Dr. Sanford | Episode: "Are You There, Alpha Centauri?" |
| 1991 | Law & Order | Manager | Episode: "Sonata for Solo Organ" |
| 1991 | Golden Years | Lieutenant McGiver | Television miniseries Episode: "Time and Time Again" |
| 1992 | Law & Order | John Ennis | Episode: "Point of View" |
| 1993 | And the Band Played On | Dr. Max Essex | Television film |
| 1993 | Acapulco H.E.A.T. | Housten | Uncredited; Episode: "Code Name: Arabesque" |
| 1994 | Twilight Zone: Rod Serling's Lost Classics | Dr. Ames | Television film Segment: "Where the Dead Are" |
| 1995 | Law & Order | Herbert Fowler | Episode: "Guardian" |
| 1996 | Harvest of Fire | Reuben Troyer | Television film |
| 1997 | New York Undercover | Inspector Reznor | Episode: "The Solomon Papers" |
| 1997 | Path to Paradise: The Untold Story of the World Trade Center Bombing | Male Attorney | Television film |
| 1997 | Witness to the Mob | George Pape | Television film |
| 1998 | Law & Order | Dr. Thomas Neustadt | Episode: "Tabloid" |
| 2000 | Now and Again | Dr. Prescott | Episode: "Fire and Ice" |
| 2000 | Cupid & Cate | Dr. Brimmer | Television film |
| 2000 | Hamlet | Priest | Television film |
| 2000–2001 | The Sopranos | Father Felix | 2 episodes |
| 2001 | The Atlantis Conspiracy | Mr. Dombrowski | Television film |
| 2001 | Law & Order: Criminal Intent | Father Capanna | Episode: "The Faithful" |
| 2001 | 100 Centre Street | Chairman / Captain Korshok | 2 episodes |
| 2001–2009 | Law & Order | Trial Judge Walter Bradley | 14 episodes |
| 2002 | The Education of Max Bickford | Mayor Owens | Episode: "Past, Present, Future" |
| 2003–2012 | Law & Order: Special Victims Unit | Trial Judge Walter Bradley | 18 episodes |
| 2005 | Sometimes in April | Bushnell's Supervisor | Television film |
| 2005 | Law & Order: Trial by Jury | Trial Judge Walter Bradley | Episode: "The Line" |
| 2005 | Stella | Mr. Mueller | Episode: "Pilot" |
| 2006 | Conviction | Judge Walter Bradley | 2 episodes |
| 2007–2009 | Damages | Judge Sanford Toomey | 4 episodes |
| 2008 | As the World Turns | Judge Harold Rice | 4 episodes |
| 2009 | Ugly Betty | Chairman | Episode: "Sugar Daddy" |
| 2009 | Mercy | Dr. Melvoy | Episode: "You Lost Me with the Cinderblock" |
| 2009 | White Collar | Walter | Episode: "The Portrait" |
| 2010 | God in America | Thomas Dudley | Episode: "A New Adam/A New Eden" |
| 2010–2013 | Boardwalk Empire | FBI Supervisor Frederick Elliott | 9 episodes |
| 2011 | Mildred Pierce | Dr. Gale | Television miniseries |
| 2013 | Muhammad Ali's Greatest Fight | Erwin Griswold | Television film |
| 2013 | Elementary | Milton Van Kirk | Episode: "We Are Everyone" |
| 2014 | Believe | FBI Director Lofton | 4 episodes |
| 2014 | The Good Wife | Professor George Paley | Episode: "Red Zone" |
| 2014 | Banshee Origins | Carter | Episode: "Birthday" |
| 2015 | The Blacklist | Man On Phone | Voice, 2 episodes |
| 2015 | Karl Manhair, Postal Inspector | Deputy Inspector Wayne Mersky | 3 episodes |
| 2015–2018 | Daredevil | Father Paul Lantom | 11 episodes |
| 2016 | Confirmation | Senator Allen Simpson | Television film |
| 2017 | The Defenders | Father Paul Lantom | Episode: "The H Word"; Television miniseries |
| 2018 | The Alienist | Mayor William Lafayette Strong | 3 episodes |
| 2018 | Gotham | Mayor Holden Pritchard | 2 episodes |
| 2021 | Clarice | Nils Hagen | Recurring cast |
| 2025 | Dope Thief | Bill McKinty | Episode: "Innocent People" |
| 2025 | The Gilded Age | Risley Sage | 2 episodes |
| 2026 | Furious | Jay Easton | 4 episodes |
