= The Street Where I Live =

1978 memoir by Alan Jay Lerner

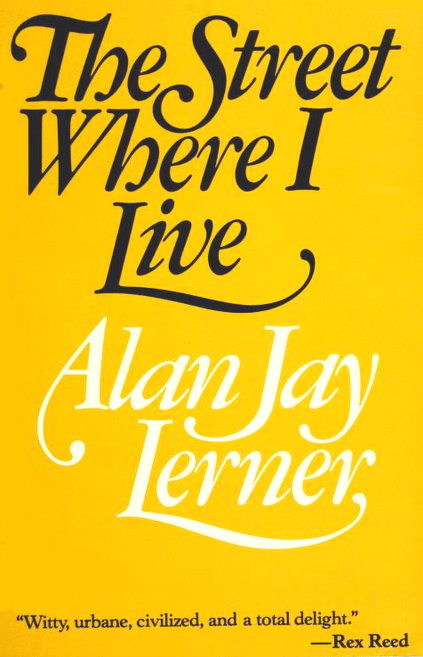
- Author: Alan Jay Lerner
- Language: English
- Genre: Memoir
- Published: 1978

The Street Where I Live is a memoir by Alan Jay Lerner, in which he describes the genesis, writing and production of three musicals he created in partnership with the composer Frederick Loewe: My Fair Lady, Gigi and Camelot. The book was published in 1978.

== Background ==
The librettist Alan Jay Lerner and the composer Frederick (Fritz) Loewe collaborated on a succession of musicals, beginning in 1942. Their first three shows were unsuccessful, but Brigadoon in 1947 and Paint Your Wagon in 1951 fared better. In 1956 the collaborators triumphed with My Fair Lady, their musical version of Shaw's Pygmalion, which broke the Broadway record for longest-running show. Their MGM musical Gigi became the most honored film musical ever, winning nine Academy Awards, including Lerner's Oscar for best screenplay and both partners' award for the title song. The partners' last collaboration was Camelot (1960).

== Content ==
The book is dedicated to Loewe: "To Fritz, without whom this would have been an address book". Lerner explains the purpose of The Street Where I Live in his introduction:

In short, this is the story of My Fair Lady, Gigi, and Camelot. And in order to explain the part that I, myself, played I shall have to begin with the biographical sketch that usually appears at the back of the program.

He gives brief accounts of his and Loewe's lives and careers before their meeting in 1942 and then skips from that year to 1952, and the genesis of My Fair Lady.

=== My Fair Lady ===
The My Fair Lady chapter gives Lerner's account of his meeting with the film producer Gabriel Pascal; the acquisition from Pascal's estate of the rights to adapt Shaw's play; the casting of the original production and the complications inherent in casting a non-singer, Rex Harrison, in the lead role of a musical; the selection of an unknown newcomer, Julie Andrews, as the heroine; and the choice of a veteran, Stanley Holloway, in the third star role; and the production and success of the show. Lerner includes some technical discussion of how lyrics are constructed and what makes – or does not make – them work well.

=== Gigi ===
The chapter on Gigi covers the suggestion by the producer Arthur Freed to consider making a film musical adaptation of Colette's novella of the same name; the creation of the work; the casting of Maurice Chevalier and Hermione Gingold and the failure to cast Dirk Bogarde; working with the director, Vincente Minnelli; and the Academy Awards.

=== Camelot ===
In the chapter on Camelot, Lerner discusses the many problems the team had in successfully adapting T. H. White's novel The Once and Future King as a musical; the crucial role played by their director, Moss Hart, in getting the show into proper shape; and the poignant aftermath when America's former First Lady Jackie Kennedy revealed that her late husband had been inspired by "the one brief shining moment that was known as Camelot".

== Publication and reception ==
The book was published in 1978 by W. W. Norton in the US and by Hodder and Stoughton in Britain. The Stage found the book "a long, rambling work, always fascinating in its detailed reminiscences", and thought its greatest strength that:

He manages to chronicle the setbacks, the breakthroughs, and the sheer toil of writing; the constant cutting and re-arranging of numbers with composer Fritz Loewe; the first reactions of friends to new songs, and the never-ending search for perfection in the delicate balance between melody line and lyrics.

The American National Biography calls Lerner's book a "partial autobiography … one of the most readable and quotable of the genre". London's The Times praised it as "Alan Jay Lerner's terrific autobiography".

The Street Where I Live was reissued in 1989 by Columbus Books and in 1994 by the Da Capo Press. In 2000, BBC radio broadcast a serialization of the book, read by Henry Goodman, which The Times called "one of the delights of the evening schedule".

== Sources ==
- Lerner, Alan Jay (1978). The Street Where I Live. London: Coronet. ISBN 978-0-340-25453-0.
