= Answer Yes or No =

American TV game show (1950)

- Genre: Game show
- Directed by: Joe Cavalier
- Presented by: Moss Hart

Production
- Producer: Wayne Wirth
- Production company: West Hooker Productions

Original release
- Network: NBC
- Release: April 30 – July 23, 1950

Answer Yes or No is an American television game show that was broadcast on NBC from April 30, 1950, until July 23, 1950.

== Premise ==
Answer Yes or No featured a celebrity panel with playwright Moss Hart as host. Regular panelists were Kitty Carlisle, Arlene Francis, and Quentin Reynolds. Francis was the only member of the panel who stayed from the show's beginning to its end.

Guests (who were also celebrities) had to decide how they would act if a specific hypothetical situation should occur. Each guest indicated his or her decision by putting down a card marked "yes" or "no". Panelists discussed what they thought the guest's response would be, after which the guest displayed the card and explained the response Guests who appeared on the show included Bennett Cerf, Arthur Schwartz and Marsha Hunt.

== Production ==
Initially a product of West Hooker Productions (WHP), Answer Yes or No was among a group of TV shows obtained by the Music Corporation of America when it bought WHP in October 1950. Wayne Wirth was the producer, and Joe Cavalier was the director. Sponsorship was on a co-operative advertising basis, with each station that carried it selling advertising rather than having a network-wide sponsor as was done with most programs at that time. Answer Yes or No was the third NBC program to use co-op sponsorship. Answer Yes or No was broadcast from 10:30 to 11 p.m. Eastern Time on Sundays.

== Critical response ==
Critic Jack Gould, writing in The New York Times, commented that the show "has spontaneity and sparkle" with a format that allowed "studio participants and home audience to enjoy the stimulus . . . of thinking." Gould noted that the show "starts off slowly and seems a little contrived but, once it gets going, it is thoroughly diverting." He commended Hart's way of keeping the program informal while also keeping it moving.

Syndicated newspaper columnist John Crosby found little to like about Answer Yes or No. Early in his review he commented that the celebrity participants "must wonder from time to time what the devil they're doing there." Later in the review he added, "But why a man of Mr. Hart's great attainments should get mixed up in such a ridiculous operation is beyond my powers of concentration." He added that the same feeling applied to the other celebrities involved.

A review in the trade publication Variety said that the premiere episode "came off as a disappointment". While the review acknowledged the cleverness of the panel with retorts and ad-libs, it said, "the show seems a bit contrived" and questioned "whether the show can sustain continuing interest and appeal."

A different article in Variety said, "Hart still lacks a TV aplomb, striving too hard for an effect in a situation where there's nothing much to say" and concluded that a format revision "only served to accent that here, in essence, are some suave, smart New Yorkers acting like kids trying to be sophisticated."
