= The Solid Gold Cadillac =

1956 film by Richard Quine

- Directed by: Richard Quine
- Screenplay by: Abe Burrows
- Based on: The Solid Gold Cadillac; 1953 play by George S. Kaufman; Howard Teichmann
- Produced by: Fred Kohlmar
- Starring: Judy Holliday; Paul Douglas; Fred Clark
- Narrated by: George Burns
- Cinematography: Charles Lang
- Edited by: Charles Nelson
- Music by: Cyril J. Mockridge
- Production company: Columbia Pictures
- Distributed by: Columbia Pictures
- Release date: August 22, 1956
- Running time: 99 minutes
- Country: United States
- Language: English
- Box office: $2.4 million (US)

The Solid Gold Cadillac is a 1956 American comedy film directed by Richard Quine and written by Abe Burrows, Howard Teichmann, and George S. Kaufman. It was adapted from the hit Broadway play of the same name by Teichmann and Kaufman that pillories big business and corrupt businessmen. The film stars Judy Holliday and Paul Douglas. The film is in black-and-white except for the final scene, which is presented in Technicolor.

== Plot ==
At a shareholders' meeting for International Projects, a billion-dollar corporation, John T. Blessington announces that he is replacing Edward L. McKeever, the company's founder, president and chairman of the board who is resigning to serve as Secretary of Defense in Washington D.C. Laura Partridge, a stockholder with just ten shares, infuriates the company's arrogant, self-serving executives by repeatedly exercising her right to ask questions during the meeting.

Blessington devises a plan to hire Laura for the meaningless position of director of shareholder relations in order to keep her occupied and out of the executives' business. He assigns her a secretary named Amelia with secret instructions to obstruct Laura as much as possible. With no substantial job duties, Laura begins to write personalized letters to the stockholders. She gains Amelia's friendship and assistance by helping her develop a romantic relationship with the office manager.

When the directors discover that Amelia is helping Laura, they fire Amelia. However, Laura discovers that Blessington's unqualified brother-in-law Harry Harkness has driven an apparent competitor into bankruptcy, unaware that International Projects actually owns the smaller company. With that as leverage, she gets Amelia rehired.

Still determined to neutralize Laura, the board sends her to Washington to persuade McKeever to award them some government contracts. She agrees to go, but secretly intends to convince McKeever to return and retake control from the crooked board even though, when assuming his Cabinet position, he had sold his shares in the company to avoid any conflict of interest. After Laura tells him about Harry's blunder, McKeever agrees to leave his government post and try to wrest control of the company. However, Blessington and his men block his attempt, and Laura quits.

McKeever takes the company to court, arguing that sending Laura to persuade him violated the lobbying laws, as she was not a registered lobbyist. When Laura is forced to admit on the stand that she had a romantic reason for seeing McKeever, the judge throws the case out. However, many of the smaller investors with whom Laura had forged relationships through her letters have sent her their proxy votes, granting Laura the right to vote their shares. Laura and McKeever use these votes to replace the entire board. At a meeting of the new board, it is revealed that Laura has married McKeever.

For its final scene, the film changes from black-and-white to color, showing the small stockholders' wedding gift to Laura, a gleaming solid gold Cadillac that she drives around Manhattan.

== Cast ==
- Judy Holliday as Laura Partridge
- Paul Douglas as Edward L. McKeever
- Fred Clark as Clifford Snell, the company treasurer
- John Williams as John T. Blessington
- Hiram Sherman as Harry Harkness, a director
- Neva Patterson as Amelia Shotgraven, assistant to Laura Partridge
- Ralph Dumke as Warren Gillie, a director
- Ray Collins as Alfred Metcalfe, another director
- Arthur O'Connell as Mark Jenkins, an office manager
- Harry Antrim as Senator Simpkins
- Richard Deacon as assistant to Edward L. McKeever
- George Burns as narrator

== Reception ==
Bosley Crowther of The New York Times praised Holliday, stating, "[T]he invincible Miss Holliday has dared to project her youthful figure and personality into the character shaped by Miss Hull" (Josephine Hull, then in her seventies, played the role in the Broadway play) and is "knocking the role completely dead." However, he felt that the villains were neither particularly convincing ("not precisely representatives of the workaday financial world"), original ("cut from a fairly familiar stencil of Kaufmanesque farce") or formidable enough ("The problems set up by the play-wrights are little barriers of cardboard farce"). He concluded, "[I]t will give you an entertaining ride, but don't expect it to take you or your intelligence very far."

A Film4 reviewer agreed that the story was not particularly convincing ("Yeah – like global capitalism gets overthrown that easily"), but "even so, it's undemanding and amusing."

== Awards and nominations ==
Jean Louis won the Academy Award for Best Costume Design, Black and White. Ross Bellah, William Kiernan and Louis Diage were nominated for the Academy Award for Best Art Direction, Black and White.

Holliday was nominated for the Golden Globe Award for Best Actress – Motion Picture Musical or Comedy, and the film was nominated for Best Motion Picture – Musical or Comedy.

== See also ==
- List of American films of 1956
