= I'd Rather Be Right =

Musical by George S. Kaufman and Moss Hart

- First edition 1937
- Music: Richard Rodgers
- Lyrics: Lorenz Hart
- Book: Moss Hart and George S. Kaufman
- Productions: 1937 Broadway; 2011 Revival

I'd Rather Be Right is a 1937 musical with a book by Moss Hart and George S. Kaufman, lyrics by Lorenz Hart, and music by Richard Rodgers. The story is a Depression-era political satire set in New York City about Washington politics and political figures such as President Franklin D. Roosevelt. The plot centers on Peggy Jones (Joy Hodges) and her boyfriend Phil (Austin Marshall), who needs a raise in order for them to get married. The President steps in and solves their dilemma.

== Production ==
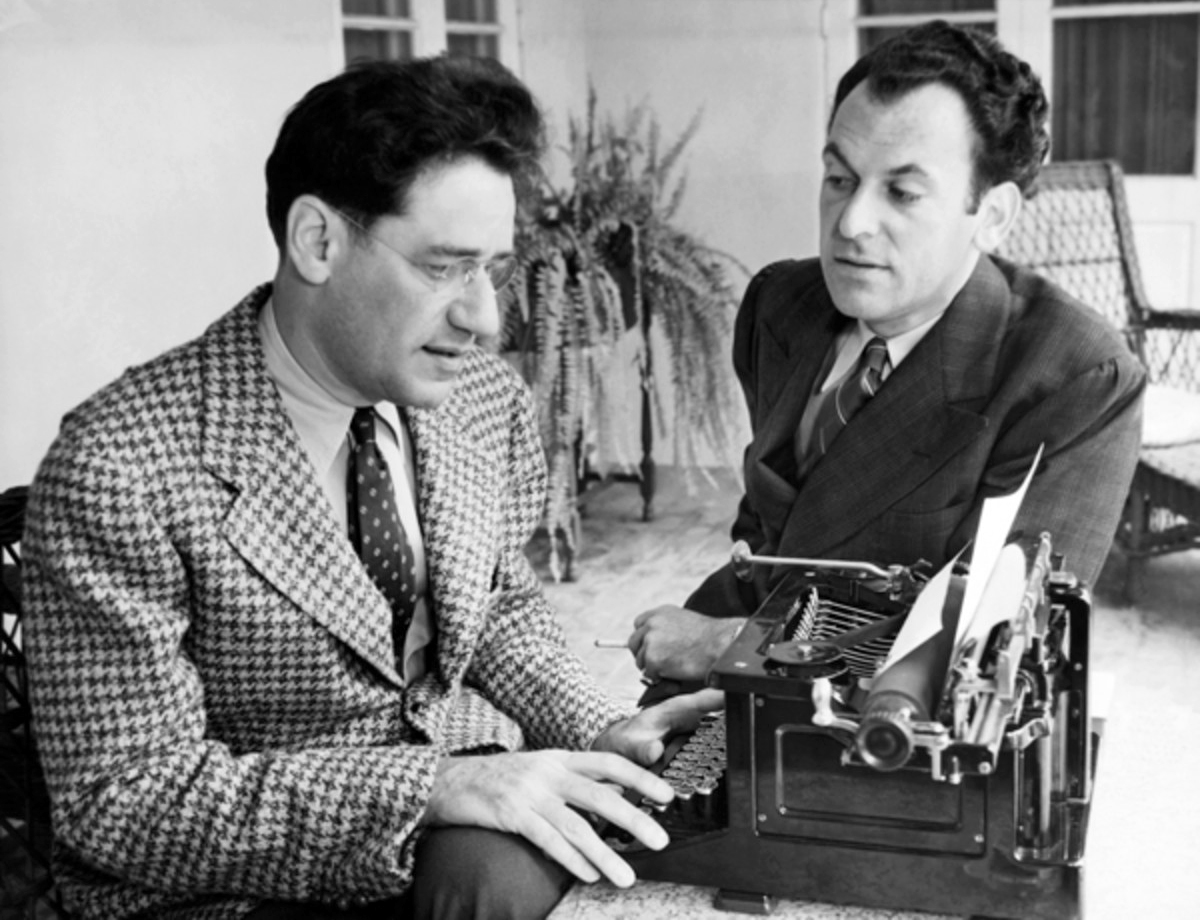
George S. Kaufman and Moss Hart in 1937

I'd Rather Be Right premiered on Broadway at the Alvin Theatre on November 2, 1937, produced by Sam H. Harris. It transferred to the Music Box Theatre, where it closed on July 9, 1938. In all, it ran for 290 performances. It starred George M. Cohan as Franklin D. Roosevelt. In such pieces as "Off the Record", Cohan, as FDR, danced, something that was not possible in real life for the President.

== Reception ==
H. G. Wells wrote enthusiastically about the musical, and Cohan's performance as Roosevelt, in an article "The Fall in America 1937", published in Collier's on January 28, 1938, and reprinted in his World Brain (1938).

== Cultural references ==
The musical is prominently featured in the 1942 Cohan biopic Yankee Doodle Dandy, in which it serves as a narrative bookend. James Cagney, playing Cohan, after meeting FDR in the Oval Office, performs a joyous tap dance as he walks back down the stairs of the White House. In the film, we also see Cagney as Cohan performing "Off the Record" during the show's run. Because the film was made during World War II, the film also anachronistically added some morale-boosting lyrics at the end of the song.

== Musical numbers ==
Original 1937 Playbill cover, with George M. Cohan as Franklin D. Roosevelt

=== Act I ===
- "A Homogeneous Cabinet"—Cabinet Members
- "Have You Met Miss Jones?"—Peggy Jones and Phil Barker
- "Take and Take and Take"—The Judge's Girl and Ensemble
- "Spring in Vienna"—Tony
- "A Little Bit of Constitutional Fun"—The Judge's Girl and Ensemble
- "Sweet Sixty-Five"—Peggy Jones and Phil Barker
- "We're Going to Balance the Budget"—The President of the United States and Company

=== Act II ===
- "American Couple"—Ensemble
- "Labor Is the Thing"—James B. Maxwell and Ensemble
- "I'd Rather Be Right"—Peggy Jones, Phil Barker, The Judge's Girl, The President of the United States and Ensemble
- "Off the Record"—The President of the United States
- "A Baby Bond"—The Secretary of the Treasury
