= Act One (book) =

Autobiography by Moss Hart

- First edition
- Author: Moss Hart
- Language: English
- Genre: Memoir, autobiography
- Publisher: Random House
- Publication date: 1959
- Publication place: United States
- Media type: Print

Act One is an autobiographical 1959 book by playwright Moss Hart. It was the source for a 1963 film and a 2014 Broadway play.

== Overview ==
The book chronicles Moss Hart's impoverished New York childhood and his long struggle to Broadway success.

== Adaptations ==
The book was adapted into the film Act One (1963).

James Lapine wrote a stage version (Act One), commissioned by the Lincoln Center Theater and developed by the Vineyard Arts Project. A reading was held in July 2012. There was also a workshop on Martha's Vineyard July 16–21, 2012, which featured Tony Shalhoub, Debra Monk, Chuck Cooper, and David Turner. The play premiered on Broadway, at the Lincoln Center Vivian Beaumont Theater, in previews on March 20, 2014, with the official opening on April 17, 2014. The play starred Santino Fontana, Tony Shalhoub, and Andrea Martin, and was directed by Lapine.

A section of Act One about his relationship with his father was adapted as the segment "A Memory of Christmas" for R. O. Blechman's 1977 special Simple Gifts. The narration was read by Jose Ferrer.
