= Howard Teichmann =

Howard Miles Teichmann (January 22, 1916 - July 7, 1987) was a Broadway playwright and biographer.

== Biography ==
Teichmann was born in Chicago in 1916. He graduated from the University of Wisconsin in 1938. He first went to work for Orson Welles on his The Mercury Theatre on the Air. He worked in the United States Office of War Information during World War II and returned to writing for radio after the war. For television, he was a co-writer for The Ford 50th Anniversary Show (1953).

Teichmann wrote the 1953 hit play The Solid Gold Cadillac with George S. Kaufman, which was later adapted to film. Other plays he wrote included Miss Lonelyhearts (1957) (adapted from the 1933 novel) and The Girls in 509 (1958). He also wrote a number of biographies, including of Kaufman (1972), Alexander Woollcott (1976), Alice Roosevelt Longworth (1979), and Henry Fonda (1981). He was also a professor at Barnard College.

Teichmann died of ALS on July 7, 1987, survived by his wife, daughter, and two grandchildren.
