= Seven Lively Arts =

Seven Lively Arts or The Seven Lively Arts may refer to:

- The Seven Lively Arts, a 1923 book by Gilbert Seldes
- Seven Lively Arts, a 1944 Broadway revue produced by Billy Rose
- The Seven Lively Arts, a 1957 TV anthology series
- The Seven Lively Arts (Dalí), 1944 and 1957 series of paintings by Salvador Dalí
