= Moss Hart =

American playwright, librettist and theater director

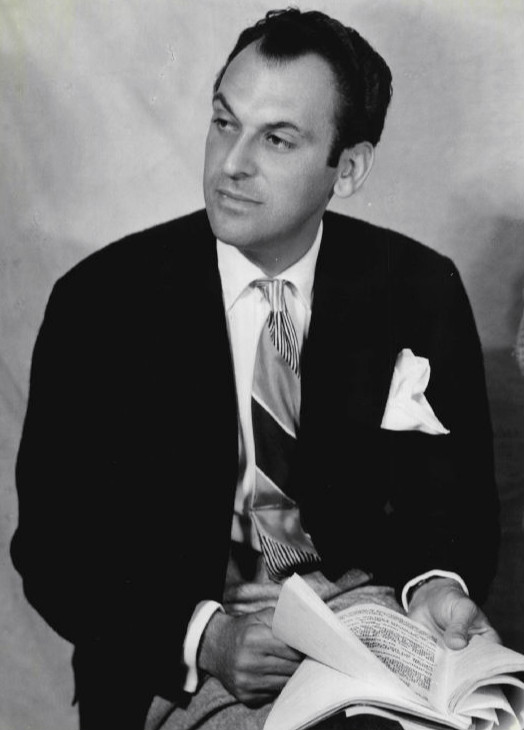
- Hart in 1940
- Born: October 24, 1904; New York City, U.S.
- Died: December 20, 1961 (aged 57); Palm Springs, California, U.S.
- Resting place: Ferncliff Cemetery
- Occupations: Playwright; librettist; theater director
- Spouse: Kitty Carlisle (m. 1946)
- Children: 2

Moss Hart (October 24, 1904 – December 20, 1961) was an American playwright, librettist, and theater director.

== Early years ==
Hart was born in New York City, the son of Lillian (Solomon) and Barnett Hart, a cigar maker. He had a younger brother, Bernard. He grew up in relative poverty in the Bronx with his English-born Jewish immigrant parents.

In his youth, he had a formative relationship with his Aunt Kate, who piqued his interest in the theater, often taking him to see performances. Hart even went so far as to create an "alternate ending" to her life in his book Act One. He learned that the theater made possible "the art of being somebody else ... not a scrawny boy with bad teeth, a funny name ... and a mother who was a distant drudge."

Hart's first glimpse of Broadway came in 1918 when he was 14 years old. He later recounted exiting the subway at Times Square and standing agog at the urban tableau before him: "A swirling mob of shouting happy people ... confetti and paper streamers ... soldiers and sailors climbed happily onto the tops of taxis, grabbing girls up to dance with them. My first thought was 'Of course, that's just the way I thought it would be.'" Unbeknownst to Hart, his arrival had coincided with the signing of the armistice that ended World War One.

== Career ==
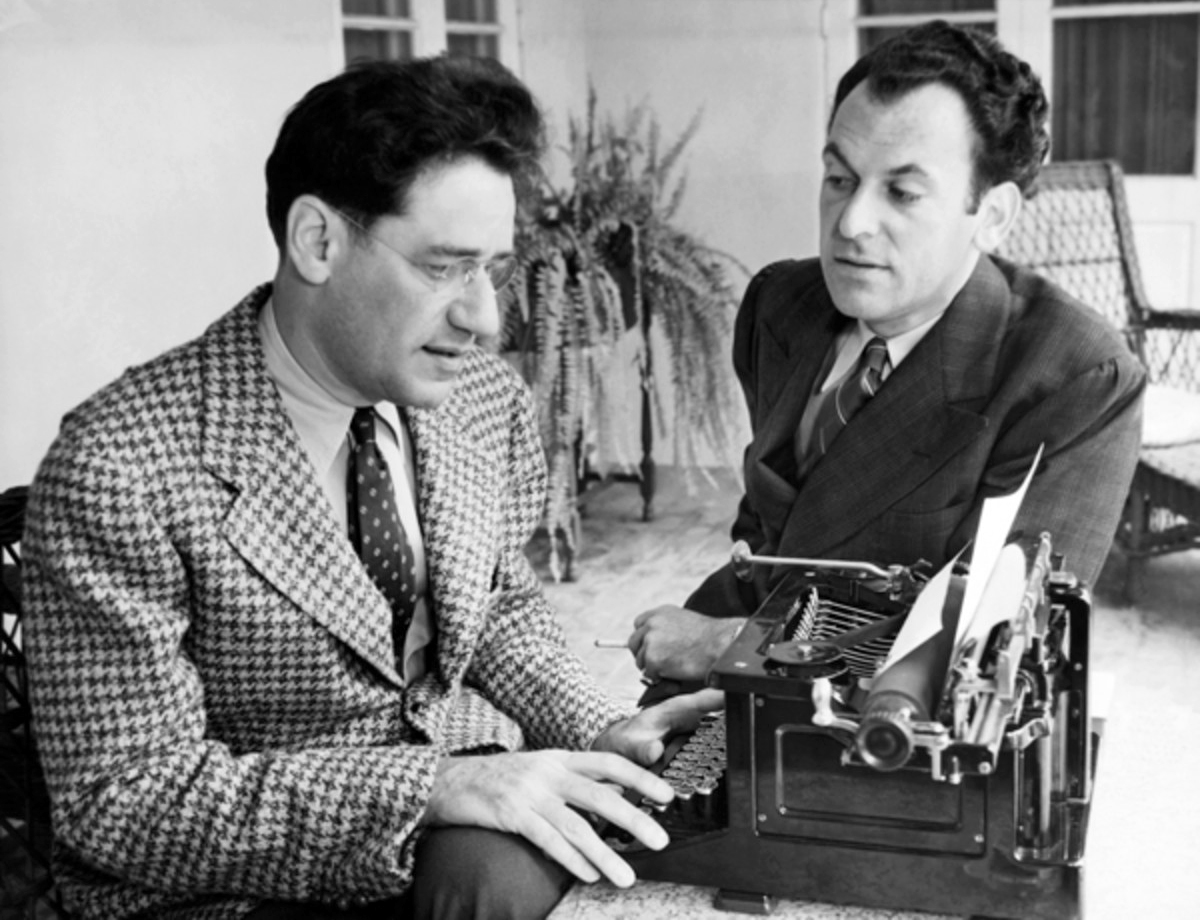
George S. Kaufman and Moss Hart in 1937

After working several years as a director of amateur theatrical groups and an entertainment director at summer resorts, he scored his first Broadway hit with Once in a Lifetime (1930), a farce about the arrival of the sound era in Hollywood. The play was written in collaboration with Broadway veteran George S. Kaufman (who regularly wrote with others, notably Marc Connelly and Edna Ferber), and produced by Sam Harris. Kaufman also performed in the play's original Broadway cast in the role of a frustrated playwright hired by Hollywood. Hart's agent at this time was Frieda Fishbein, who brought a lawsuit against Hart, contending she was entitled to a percentage of the royalties from plays produced by Harris. The matter was settled out of court for an undisclosed amount.

During the next decade, Kaufman and Hart teamed on a string of successes, including You Can't Take It with You (1936) and The Man Who Came to Dinner (1939). Though Kaufman had hits with others, Hart is generally conceded to be his most important collaborator.

You Can't Take It With You, the story of an eccentric family and how they live during the Depression, won the 1937 Pulitzer Prize for drama. It is Hart's most-revived play. When director Frank Capra and writer Robert Riskin adapted it for the screen in 1938, the film won the Best Picture Oscar and Capra won for Best Director.

The Man Who Came To Dinner is about the caustic Sheridan Whiteside who, after injuring himself slipping on ice, must stay in a Midwestern family's house. The character was based on Kaufman and Hart's friend, critic Alexander Woollcott. Other characters in the play are based on Noël Coward, Harpo Marx and Gertrude Lawrence.

Throughout the 1930s, Hart worked both with and without Kaufman on several musicals and revues, including Face the Music (1932); As Thousands Cheer (1933), with songs by Irving Berlin; Jubilee (1935), with songs by Cole Porter; and I'd Rather Be Right (1937), with songs by Richard Rodgers and Lorenz Hart (not related). After George Washington Slept Here (1940), Kaufman and Hart called it quits.

After parting with Kaufman, Hart continued to write plays, such as Christopher Blake (1946) and Light Up the Sky (1948), and wrote the book for the musical Lady In The Dark (1941), with songs by Kurt Weill and Ira Gershwin. However, he became best known during this period as a director. Among the Broadway hits he staged were Junior Miss (1941), Dear Ruth (1944) and Anniversary Waltz (1954).

By far his biggest hit was the musical My Fair Lady (1956), adapted from George Bernard Shaw's Pygmalion, with book and lyrics by Alan Jay Lerner and music by Frederick Loewe. The show ran over six years and won a Tony Award for Best Musical. Hart picked up the Tony for Best Director.

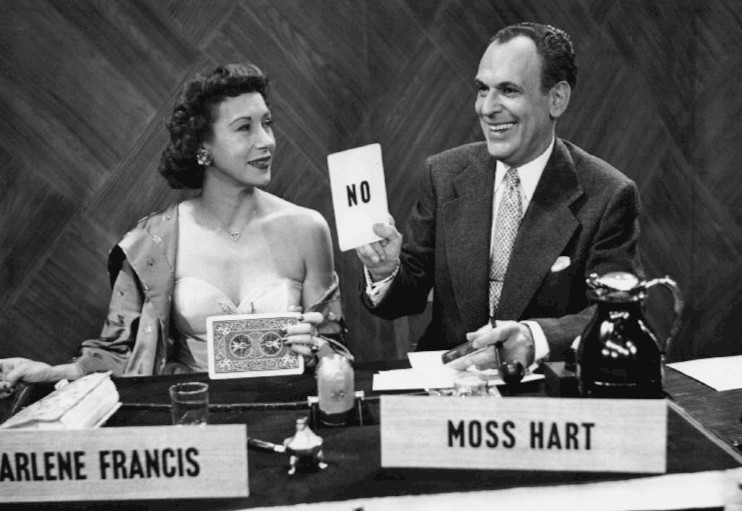
Hart was the host of an early television game show, Answer Yes or No, in 1950. Arlene Francis was one of the panelists.

In 1950 Hart was host of the game show Answer Yes or No on NBC television.

Hart also wrote some screenplays, including Gentleman's Agreement (1947) (for which he received an Oscar nomination), Hans Christian Andersen (1952) and A Star Is Born (1954). His memoir Act One: An Autobiography (1950) was adapted for film in 1963, with George Hamilton portraying Hart.

The last show Hart directed was the Lerner and Loewe musical Camelot (1960). During a troubled out-of-town tryout, Hart had a heart attack. The show opened before he fully recovered, but he and Lerner reworked it after the opening. That, along with huge pre-sales and a cast performance on The Ed Sullivan Show, helped ensure the expensive production was a hit.

== Guild presidency ==
Hart was the tenth president of the Dramatists Guild of America, from 1947 until 1956, when Oscar Hammerstein II became his successor.

== Personal life ==
Hart married Kitty Carlisle on August 10, 1946; they had two children.

According to Nancy Olson in her memoir A Front Row Seat: An Intimate Look at Broadway, Hollywood, and the Age of Glamour, Hart had homosexual tendencies and underwent psychiatric sessions trying to change his sexual orientation:

She [Carlisle] told me a story that she said she had never shared with anyone. It’s true that Moss had a sexual-identity issue. Years before he met Kitty, it was rumored that he was gay. He didn’t want to be gay and spent most of his life visiting his psychiatrist, who assisted him in taking a different path. But it was Kitty’s need to be Mrs. Moss Hart that changed the situation. She seduced him in a manner that he couldn’t resist. He was eternally grateful, and they had two beautiful children, a son and a daughter to give him the most joy.

== Death ==
Moss Hart died of a heart attack at the age of 57 on December 20, 1961, at his winter home in Palm Springs, California. He was entombed in a crypt at Ferncliff Cemetery in Hartsdale, New York.

== Legacy ==
In 1972, 11 years after his death, Moss Hart was inducted into the American Theater Hall of Fame, one of 23 people to be selected into the Hall of Fame's first induction class that year. Alan Jay Lerner paid tribute to Hart in his memoir, The Street Where I Live.

=== Moss Hart Awards ===
The New England Theatre Conference offers the Moss Hart Memorial Award at their annual convention to theater groups in New England that put forth imaginative productions of exemplary scripts. These awards are designed to honor Moss Hart as well as the award recipients. Past winners include Wellesley Repertory Theatre, Staples Players, and Suffield Academy.

=== Moss Hart and Kitty Carlisle Hart New Play Initiative ===
Developed as an offshoot of the New Play Initiative of Burbank, California's Grove Theater Center, the Moss Hart and Kitty Carlisle Hart New Play Initiative (Hart NPI) guarantees playwrights a production of their play in Los Angeles (Burbank), as well as an Off-Broadway Premiere at 59E59 Theaters in New York City. The GTC New Play Initiative was the idea of producers Charles Johanson and Kevin Cochran (founders of Grove Theater Center), eventually expanding to include both the East and West Coasts. The Hart NPI is under the leadership of Moss Hart's son Christopher Hart as artistic director, Kevin Cochran as producing artistic director, and Charles Johanson as executive director. In the first Hart NPI play cycle (2017–2018) there were 1,243 submissions from 44 states and 6 countries.

== Works ==
=== Plays ===
- 1930 Once In A Lifetime (Hart and Kaufman)
- 1933 As Thousands Cheer (music and lyrics by Irving Berlin)
- 1934 Merrily We Roll Along (Hart and Kaufman)
- 1936 You Can't Take It with You (Hart and Kaufman; Pulitzer Prize winner)
- 1937 I'd Rather Be Right (Hart and Kaufman)
- 1938 The Fabulous Invalid (Hart and Kaufman)
- 1939 The American Way (Hart and Kaufman)
- 1939 The Man Who Came to Dinner (Hart and Kaufman)
- 1940 George Washington Slept Here (Hart and Kaufman)
- 1941 Lady in the Dark, with Kurt Weill and Ira Gershwin
- 1943 Winged Victory
- 1946 Christopher Blake
- 1948 Light Up the Sky

=== Screenplays ===
- 1944 Winged Victory
- 1947 Gentleman's Agreement
- 1952 Hans Christian Andersen
- 1954 A Star Is Born

=== Director ===
- 1941 Lady in the Dark
- 1941 Junior Miss
- 1943 Winged Victory
- 1944 Dear Ruth
- 1945 The Secret Room
- 1946 Christopher Blake
- 1948 Light Up the Sky
- 1949 Miss Liberty
- 1952 The Climate of Eden
- 1954 Anniversary Waltz
- 1956 My Fair Lady
- 1960 Camelot

=== Autobiography ===
- 1959 (1989) Act One: An Autobiography. New York: St. Martin's Press. 1989 [1959]. ISBN 0-312-03272-2.
