= Siege of the Saxons =

1963 British medieval adventure film by Nathan H. Juran

- Original cinema poster
- Directed by: Nathan H. Juran
- Written by: John Kohn; Jud Kinberg
- Produced by: Jud Kinberg; Charles H. Schneer
- Starring: Janette Scott; Ronald Lewis; Ronald Howard; Mark Dignam; John Laurie
- Cinematography: Wilkie Cooper
- Edited by: Maurice Rootes
- Music by: Laurie Johnson
- Production company: Ameran Films
- Distributed by: Columbia Pictures
- Release dates: July 1963 (UK); August 1963 (US)
- Running time: 85 minutes
- Country: United Kingdom
- Language: English

Siege of the Saxons is a 1963 British medieval adventure film directed by Nathan H. Juran and released by Columbia Pictures. Starring Janette Scott and Ronald Lewis, the film is set in the time of King Arthur. As with many Arthurian films, the sets, style and much of the setting are based on England in the High Middle Ages, but anachronistically combined with elements of the Anglo-Saxon settlement of Britain. The plot also contains elements of Robin Hood.

== Plot ==
King Arthur learns that one of his knights is plotting to take over and marry his daughter. Soon the soldiers of double-dealing Edmund of Cornwall slay the king. However his daughter Katherine escapes with the help of outlaw Robert Marshall. Claiming that Katherine is dead, Edmund prepares to usurp the throne in league with Saxon invaders.

After coming close to death more than once at the hands of the sinister limping man, Katherine and Robert and other loyal countrymen rescue the great wizard Merlin from the hands of Edmund's men to help them save Camelot and England. They arrive at Camelot just as Edmund is about to be crowned. On Merlin's advice, Robert challenges Edmund to kill him as a traitor, by using Arthur's sword Excalibur.

Edmund is unable to draw the sword from the scabbard, whereupon Robert presents the sword to Katherine, the rightful heir, who draws it out easily. Katherine is recognised by the court as the new Queen. Following a battle against Edmund's remaining men and the invading force of Saxons, Katherine's armies prevail. She offers the lands of Edmund and other renegades to Robert, so that he can rule alongside her as King.

== Cast ==
- Janette Scott as Katherine
- Ronald Lewis as Robert Marshall
- Ronald Howard as Edmund of Cornwall
- Mark Dignam as King Arthur
- John Laurie as Merlin
- Jerome Willis as the Limping Man
- Charles Lloyd-Pack as the Doctor
- Francis de Wolff as the Blacksmith

== Production ==
Producer Charles H. Schneer made it after a series of fantasies with Ray Harryhausen. This and East of Sudan were made over 15 days, using stock footage. "Columbia had a lot of unused footage in their library," said the producer. "If 10 percent [sic] or less of a film made in the United Kingdom was comprised of stock footage, you received a government subsidy. I decided that would be a good commercial opportunity, so I made both pictures that way. I took the big action sequences out of Columbia's library." Siege of the Saxons used The Black Knight and East of Sudan used footage from Beyond Mombassa.

It was the first of three consecutive films director Nathan Juran made for producer Charles Schnee in England.

Shooting was conducted around the Home Counties in England and at Bray Studios in Berkshire. Oakley Court near Windsor, Berkshire was used for the castle interiors, Burnham Beeches in Buckinghamshire was the forest, and the final battle scenes were shot at Callow Hill, Virginia Water, in Surrey.

The film reused a lot of costumes, props, and footage from the earlier and bigger-budgeted 1954 Columbia film, The Black Knight, starring Alan Ladd and costumes and props from the 1963 film Lancelot and Guinevere directed by and starring Cornel Wilde. The hero dons Alan Ladd's armor from The Black Knight. King Arthur wears the same costume as Brian Aherne did as Arthur in Lancelot and Guinevere and even looks much the same as Aherne. The film also uses sequences from some of Columbia's Robin Hood films. According to Filmink the use of footage from a film starring blonde Alan Ladd explains Ronald "Lewis' silly blonde wig" in Siege of Saxons.

== Release ==
The film was released on a double bill with Schneer's Jason and the Argonauts (1963), a film best remembered for its Ray Harryhausen special effects.

Schneer later hired Juran to direct another pair of films for a similar double bill: a large budget fantasy with special effects by Harryhausen, The First Men in the Moon, and a lower-budgeted English adventure heavily reliant on stock footage, East of Sudan.

The Monthly Film Bulletin called it "statutory but good humoured and moderately jolly... hampered by flat direction and cramped settings."

Variety argued the film "is not intended to be quite as comic as it turned out to be."
