= Clash of the Titans (1981 film) =

1981 film directed by Desmond Davis

- Theatrical release poster by the Brothers Hildebrandt
- Directed by: Desmond Davis
- Written by: Beverley Cross
- Based on: Perseus
- Produced by: Charles H. Schneer; Ray Harryhausen
- Starring: Harry Hamlin; Laurence Olivier; Judi Bowker; Maggie Smith; Burgess Meredith; Ursula Andress
- Cinematography: Ted Moore
- Edited by: Timothy Gee
- Music by: Laurence Rosenthal
- Production company: Metro-Goldwyn-Mayer; Peerford, Ltd.; Titan Productions; Charles H. Schneer Productions
- Distributed by: United Artists (US/Canada); Cinema International Corporation (International)
- Release dates: June 12, 1981 (US); July 2, 1981 (UK)
- Running time: 118 minutes
- Countries: United States; United Kingdom
- Language: English
- Budget: $9–15 million
- Box office: $70 million

Clash of the Titans is a 1981 epic fantasy adventure film directed by Desmond Davis and written by Beverley Cross, loosely based on the Greek myth of Perseus. Starring Harry Hamlin, Judi Bowker, Burgess Meredith, Maggie Smith and Laurence Olivier, the film features the final work of stop-motion visual effects artist Ray Harryhausen, who also co-produced the film alongside Charles H. Schneer.

An international co-production between the United States and United Kingdom, Clash of the Titans was theatrically released on June 12, 1981, and grossed $41 million at the North American box office, making it the eleventh-highest grossing film of the year. A novelization by Alan Dean Foster was also published in 1981. A 3D remake of the same name was released by Warner Bros. on April 2, 2010.

== Plot ==
King Acrisius of Argos imprisons his daughter Danaë, jealous of her beauty. When the god Zeus impregnates Danaë, Acrisius casts her and her newborn son Perseus into the sea in a wooden chest. In retribution, Zeus kills Acrisius and orders Poseidon to release the last of the Titans, a gigantic sea monster called the Kraken, to destroy Argos. Danaë and Perseus safely float to the island of Seriphos, where Perseus grows to adulthood.

Calibos, the malevolent son of the treacherous sea goddess Thetis, is betrothed to Princess Andromeda, daughter of Queen Cassiopeia of Joppa. Guilty of numerous atrocities, such as the destruction of Zeus' sacred flying horses, Calibos is transformed into a deformed monster to fit the ugliness of his evil heart.

Seeking revenge, Thetis transports Perseus to an abandoned amphitheater in Joppa, where he befriends a soldier, Thallo, and an elderly poet named Ammon. Perseus learns that Andromeda is cursed and cannot marry unless her suitor successfully answers a riddle concocted by Calibos. Zeus sends Perseus an Athenian god-crafted helmet which makes its wearer invisible, a magical sword from Aphrodite, and a shield from Hera. Perseus captures Pegasus, the last of Zeus's winged horses, and they pursue Calibos, who is carrying off Andromeda's spirit on a giant vulture. Perseus fights with Calibos; Perseus loses his helmet, Calibos his left hand. Perseus presents himself as a suitor, presents Calibos' ring, still attached to his severed appendage, and wins Andromeda's hand in marriage. When Thetis cannot act directly against Perseus, Calibos demands she take vengeance on Joppa by unleashing the Kraken on it.

At the wedding in Thetis' temple, Cassiopeia declares that Andromeda's beauty is greater than Thetis'. Thetis, speaking through the statue's head, declares Cassiopeia will pay for her boasting and Calibos' injuries, and demands Andromeda be sacrificed to the Kraken on pain of Joppa's destruction. Pegasus is captured by Calibos and his men. Zeus commands Athena to give Perseus her owl Bubo, but she refuses. Instead, she orders Hephaestus to build a mechanical replica that leads Perseus, Andromeda, Ammon, Thallo, and some soldiers to the Stygian Witches. By taking their magic eye, Perseus forces them to reveal the way to defeat the Kraken is by using the head of the Gorgon Medusa, whose gaze can turn any living thing into stone. Medusa lives on an island in the River Styx at the edge of the Underworld.

Perseus kills Medusa's guardian, a two-headed dog named Dioskilos, uses the reflective underside of his shield to deceive Medusa, and beheads her. Calibos enters Perseus' camp and punctures the cloak carrying Medusa's head, causing her blood to transform into three giant scorpions. One soldier is killed, but Perseus and Thallo defeat the scorpions. Calibos kills Thallo, attacks Perseus with his whip, and is killed by Perseus.

Alone and weakened, Perseus sends Bubo to rescue Pegasus from Calibos' henchmen, reaches the amphitheater in Joppa, and collapses from exhaustion. Andromeda is shackled to a sacrificial rock, and the Kraken is summoned. Bubo distracts the beast until Perseus, whose strength was secretly restored by Zeus, appears on Pegasus. Perseus petrifies the Kraken with Medusa's head and frees. Perseus and Andromeda marry, and the gods predict they will live happily, rule wisely, and produce children. Zeus forbids the other gods to pursue vengeance against them. The constellations of Perseus, Andromeda, Pegasus and Cassiopeia are created in their honor.

== Cast ==
- Harry Hamlin as Perseus
- Judi Bowker as Andromeda
- Burgess Meredith as Ammon
- Maggie Smith as Thetis
- Siân Phillips as Cassiopeia
- Claire Bloom as Hera
- Ursula Andress as Aphrodite
- Laurence Olivier as Zeus
- Pat Roach as Hephaestus
- Susan Fleetwood as Athena
- Tim Pigott-Smith as Thallo
- Neil McCarthy as Calibos
- Vida Taylor as Danaë
- Jack Gwillim as Poseidon
- Donald Houston as Acrisius
- Flora Robson, Anna Manahan, and Freda Jackson as The Stygian Witches

== Production ==
The film was the idea of writer Beverley Cross. In 1978, Andor Films submitted a copy of the script to the British Board of Film Classification, seeking advice on how to secure either a "U" or an "A" certificate. The draft script included scenes that the BBFC considered would be unacceptable under those certificates, including the Kraken tearing Pegasus to pieces and Andromeda appearing naked during the climax of the film. Changes to the script and, on submission, some cuts to Perseus's final battle with Calibos were made and the film secured the "A" certificate: "Those aged 5 and older admitted, but not recommended for children under 14 years of age".

Columbia Pictures were initially set to distribute the film having made most of Harryhausen and producer Charles H. Schneer's films, but after a change of guard at the studio, they dropped the project during pre-production, saying it was too expensive. Schneer took it to Orion Pictures who insisted on Arnold Schwarzenegger playing the lead but the producer refused as the role involved too much dialogue. He then tried Metro-Goldwyn-Mayer who agreed to finance. "They loved the material, they loved the picture, and they were wonderful to us," said Schneer. "As I put the film together and the castings came up, they approved the additional castings and added that expense to the budget."

The characters of Calibos and Bubo the mechanical owl were not derived from Greek mythology, and were instead original creations for the film. One character, however, was originally named, and was based on Orthrus, the two-headed dog from Greek mythology, but changed to Dioskilos instead.

In a 2025 interview, Harry Hamlin stated that he threatened to leave the production when producers insisted that the scene where Perseus cuts off Medusa's head be rewritten. Producers feared the violence of the scene would garner the film an X rating in the UK. Hamlin protested the changes, as the scene was central to the story, both in the mythology of Perseus and in the film. Producers relented and the scene was filmed as originally written.

=== Casting ===
Schneer deliberately sought better known actors to play the Gods to improve the film's chances at the box office. "If we had played this picture with no recognised actors it might be assumed to be what it isn't. It might suffer the fate of an Italian Western." The scenes involving the Gods only took eight days. Claire Bloom said she only agreed to make it "because I was told Olivier was doing it and it only lasts a week."

MGM overruled Schneer's choice of John Gielgud to portray the playwright Ammon, and asked for Burgess Meredith to be cast instead. "I saw the sense in that," said Schneer. "They preferred an American actor. They didn't want the public to think it was totally an English picture."

Schneer chose Desmond Davis as director in part because Davis had made several BBC Shakespeare films and he wanted someone with experience dealing with Shakespearean actors.

Stars Harry Hamlin and Ursula Andress were romantically involved at the time of production. Their son, Dimitri, was born in 1980 after filming was completed, and their relationship ended in 1983.

Jack Gwillim, who appeared as Poseidon, had earlier played the role of King Aeëtes in the original Jason and the Argonauts in 1963.

The film's screenwriter, Beverley Cross, was married to Maggie Smith, who played Thetis, until his death in 1998. Cross worked with producer Charles H. Schneer before, writing the screenplay for Schneer's production of Jason and the Argonauts.

=== Filming locations ===
The film was shot at the Albert R. Broccoli 007 Stage at Pinewood Studios, United Kingdom, with locations including Cornwall, UK, and Paestum, Italy.

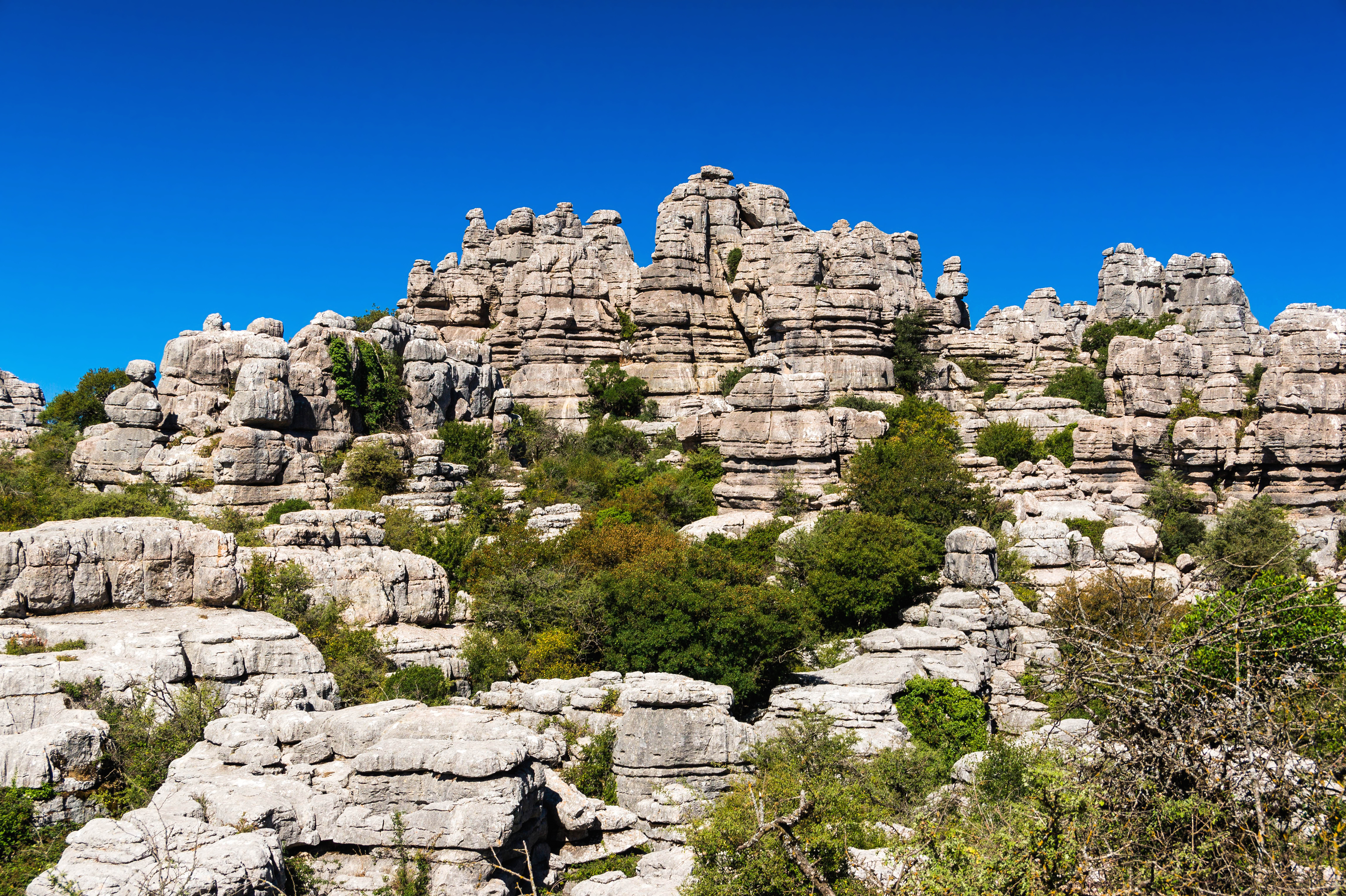
The karst area in El Torcal de Antequera, Spain, appears in the visit to the Stygian witches.

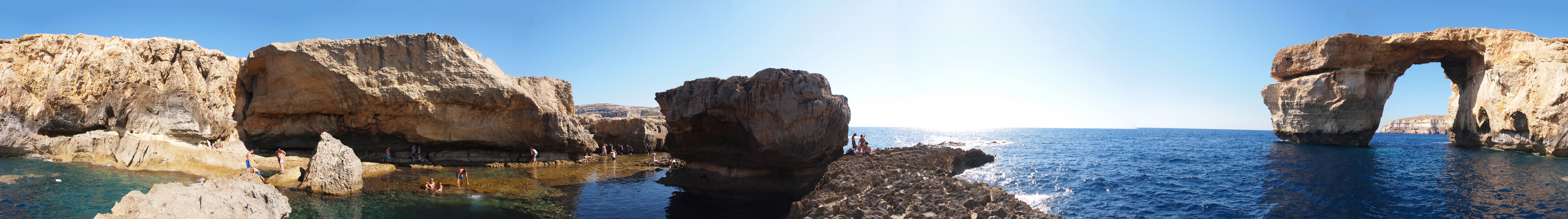
The Azure Window in Gozo, Malta, appears in the battle against the Kraken.

=== Special effects ===
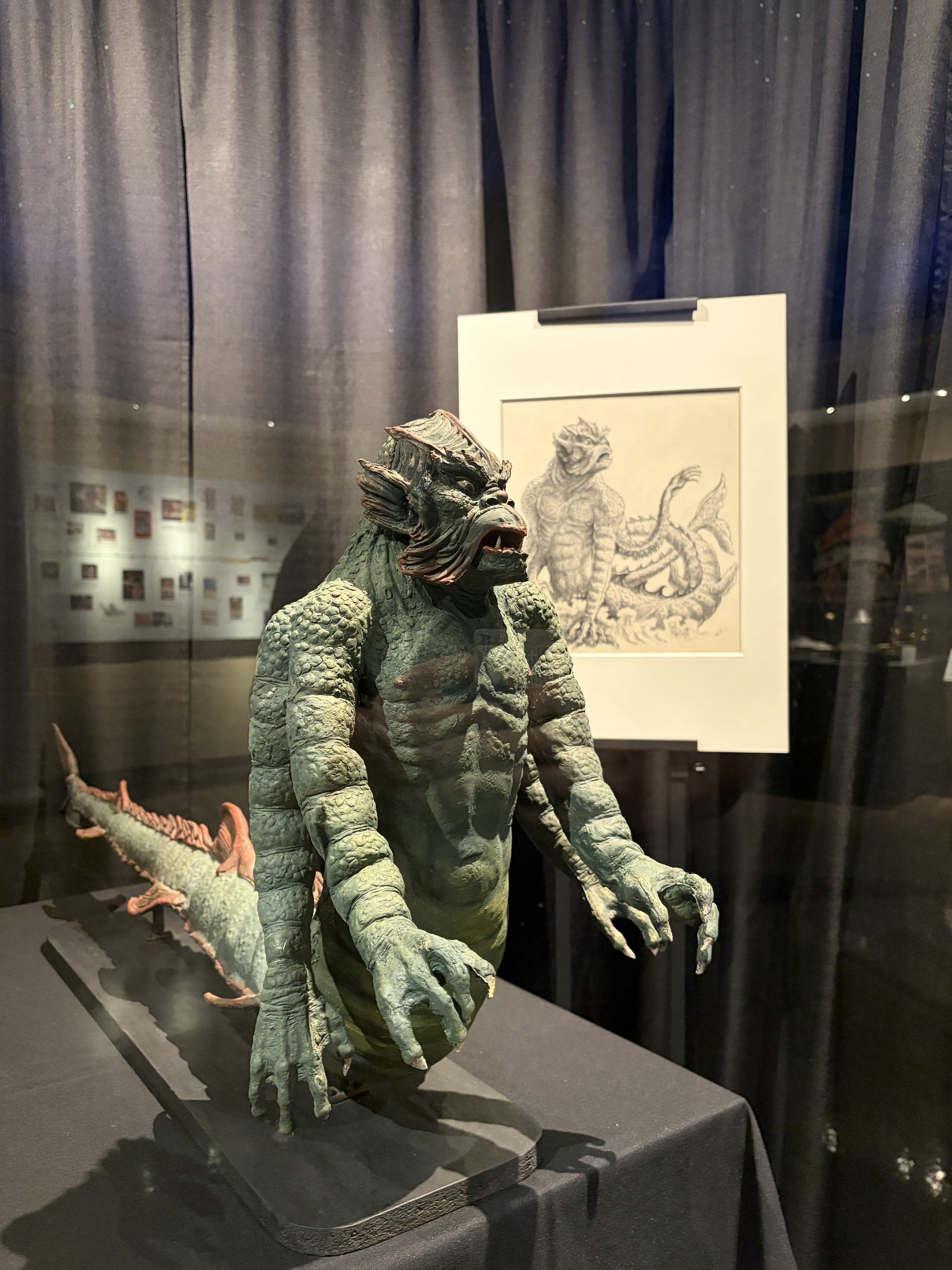
Ray Harryhausen model of the kraken from Clash of the Titans (1981) on display at the Mini Time Machine Museum of Miniatures, Tucson, Arizona (2026)

Ray Harryhausen used stop-motion animation to create the various creatures in the film, including Calibos, his vulture, Pegasus, Bubo the mechanical owl, Dioskilos, Medusa, the scorpions and the Kraken. Stephen R. Wilk wrote that though the film's story "sticks closer to its sources than any other interpretation", one of the creative liberties taken is Medusa's biology, which differs from "any previous representations, ancient or modern", with the lower body of a snake rather than legs (see Lamia). Harryhausen's Medusa has been called "one of the most recognizable characters in model-animation cinema history." Two identical models of Bubo the mechanical owl were made: one that contained remote controlled motors that allowed it to move when handled by the actor, and a stop-motion model because the movements of the live action model were more limited. Roger Ebert called Clash of the Titans Harryhausen's "masterwork". Harryhausen was also co-producer of the film, and retired from film-making shortly after it was released.

Despite Bubo's similarities to the droid R2-D2 of the 1977 film Star Wars, Harryhausen claimed Bubo was created before Star Wars was released. The BBFC, reviewing the film for certification in 1981, said Harryhausen's effects were well done and would give entertainment to audiences of all ages, but might appear a little "old hat" to those familiar with Star Wars and Superman. The stop-motion troglodyte figurine used in Sinbad and the Eye of the Tiger (1977) was cannibalized to make Calibos. The stop-motion Ymir template used in 20 Million Miles to Earth (1957) was also recycled to make the Kraken.

== Reception ==
=== Box office ===
Clash of the Titans was released on June 12, 1981 and grossed $6,565,347 from 1,127 theaters in its opening weekend, second behind Raiders of the Lost Ark at the U.S. box office, which was released on the same date. By the time it finished its theatrical run, it had grossed $41 million in North America. The film had a worldwide gross of over $70 million and was one of 1981's biggest hits.

It was shown repeatedly on HBO.

=== Critical reception ===
On review aggregator website Rotten Tomatoes, the film holds an approval rating of 64% based on 109 reviews. The website's critical consensus reads, "A goofy, old-school sword-and-sandal epic, Clash of the Titans mines Greek mythology for its story and fleshes it out with Ray Harryhausen's charmingly archaic stop-motion animation techniques." Metacritic, which uses a weighted average, assigned the film a score of 59 out of 100, based on 9 critics, indicating "mixed or average" reviews.

Roger Ebert of the Chicago Sun-Times gave the film three and a half out of four stars and called it "a grand and glorious romantic adventure, filled with brave heroes, beautiful heroines, fearsome monsters, and awe-inspiring duels to the death. It is a lot of fun." Gene Siskel of the Chicago Tribune also gave the film three and a half stars out of four and called it "a special effects spectacular that succeeds brilliantly as an old-fashioned adventure film based on the legends of Greek mythology." Variety called it "an unbearable bore of a film that will probably put to sleep the few adults stuck taking the kids to it. This mythical tale of Perseus, son of Zeus, and his quest for the 'fair' Andromeda, is mired in a slew of corny dialog and an endless array of flat, outdated special effects that are both a throwback to a bad 1950s picture." Vincent Canby of The New York Times wrote, "Though not very witty, the adventures are many and involve a lot of Mr. Harryhausen's specialities," though he thought the monsters were "less convincing than interesting." Kevin Thomas of the Los Angeles Times stated that the film "has charm, it has imagination, but it is also too often stodgy. It is an instance of the whole not being nearly as good as its parts. However, Harryhausen's contributions do delight, and this may be more than enough for his ardent admirers and most youngsters." Gary Arnold of The Washington Post wrote that Hamlin was "always a magnetic presence" but the film's appeal was "quaint and stilted." Geoff Brown of The Monthly Film Bulletin wrote that the film "unfortunately fails to shake much dust off the genre ... Despite the producers' protracted labours, there's a real possibility that some audiences will be turned to stone before Medusa shows up." Time stated "The real titan is Ray Harryhausen."

Christopher John reviewed Clash of the Titans in Ares Magazine #9 and commented that "Clash of the Titans is still one of Harryhausen's best works. It has a decent script, a fine cast, and a lot of good effects. The problem lies in the little things. If, in truth, it was to be a clash of the titans, then that is who should have been featured; it should have been either the gods' or Perseus' story, not both. The film falls between two schools... and even Harryhausen can't save it no matter how excellent his magic."

C. J. Henderson reviewed Clash of the Titans for Pegasus magazine and stated that "For years, people had been saying that, if Harryhausen could get his hands on a decent budget, he would turn out the greatest fantasy film ever made. Well, after finally being given a monumental $20,000,000.00 to play with, the revered creator of dynarama not only did not make the best fantasy film ever made, but he did not even make his own best film. Clash ranks low on the Harryhausen ladder, containing some of his worst special effects."

In a book published in 2000, Stephen R. Wilk suggested that "most people today who are aware of the story of Perseus and Medusa owe their knowledge to" the film.

== Legacy ==
The four-issue comic book miniseries Wrath of the Titans (2007), released by TidalWave Productions as part of their Ray Harryhausen Signature Series, picked up the story five years after the events of the film.

Harry Hamlin reprised his role as Perseus for the video game God of War II (2007).

The 3D remake Clash of the Titans (2010) and its sequel Wrath of the Titans (2012) were released by the property's current rights holder Warner Bros. (through Turner Entertainment Co., WB's sister company). The Kraken appears in The Lego Batman Movie as one of the villains rallied by the Joker to destroy Gotham City. Bubo made an appearance in "The Trouble with Truth", an episode of the animated series Justice League Action.

== Abandoned follow-up ==
Ray Harryhausen and producer Charles H. Schneer intended to produce another film based on Greek mythology titled Force of the Trojans. Harryhausen did some pre-production work on the project, however, Harryhausen made the announcement at the 1985 San Jose Film Festival that he intended to retire in order to spend time with his family and enjoy leisure time. Harryhausen also hinted that the inundation of effects heavy productions popularized by George Lucas and Steven Spielberg may have contributed to his decision to retire.

== See also ==
- Greek mythology in popular culture
- List of historical drama films
- List of stop motion films
