= East of Sudan =

- Original cinema poster
- Directed by: Nathan H. Juran
- Written by: Jud Kinberg
- Produced by: Nathan Juran; Charles H. Schneer (uncredited)
- Starring: Anthony Quayle; Jenny Agutter; Sylvia Syms
- Cinematography: Wilkie Cooper
- Edited by: Ernest Hosler
- Music by: Laurie Johnson
- Production company: Ameran Films
- Distributed by: Columbia Pictures
- Release dates: 16 August 1964 (United Kingdom); July 1965 (United States)
- Running time: 85 minutes
- Country: United Kingdom
- Language: English

East of Sudan is a 1964 British adventure film directed by Nathan Juran and starring Anthony Quayle, Sylvia Syms, and Derek Fowlds. It was written by Jud Kinberg.

== Plot ==
In late 1884, during the height of the Mahdist insurrection in the Sudan, Mahdist forces led by several hundred Dervishes armed with broad curved swords attack Barash, a British outpost, located 200 miles (320 km) upriver from Khartoum.

Three soldiers and a woman with a young child escape to the river and steal a small riverboat. One soldier, Major Harris, is shot as they leave and dies soon after. They debate throwing him overboard. The boat has bullet holes under the waterline and they have to bail water to stay afloat. They draw ashore to bury the major.

The survivors introduce themselves: Private Richard Baker, a hardened British soldier; Murchison, a young officer; Asua, the daughter of the local Emir; and Asua's British governess, Margaret Woodville. The latter hope to reach Khartoum. Private Baker explains why they should not. They leave the boat and Baker creates a shelter for the coming storm. Margaret refuses to share it with the men who take shelter under the sail of the boat.

Over the course of the journey, the group face danger on the Nile and its banks. Facing off against nature, Arab slavers, and a beleaguered African tribe the slavers prey on, they are saved by King Gondoko's son Kimrasi, who then joins them as they head for Khartoum.

Baker frequently clashes with Murchison and Margaret. Murchison declares his love for Margaret, which is not returned, and over time Baker and Margaret fall in love.

Once past Khartoum, they find a battle between the Mahdists and the British in progress, and the men join the fight. Murchison's knowledge of the nearby Mahdist-held fort enables them to blow up the arsenal and save the day. Murchison is commended for bravery by a British major, whereas Baker is arrested for desertion, but Margaret confirms her love for him.

== Cast ==
- Anthony Quayle as Private Richard Baker
- Sylvia Syms as Miss Margaret Woodville
- Derek Fowlds as Murchison
- Jenny Agutter as Asua
- Johnny Sekka as Kimrasi
- Joseph Layode as Gondoku the tribal chief
- Harold Coyne as Major Harris
- Derek Blomfield as second Major
- Ilarrio Bisi Pedro as witch doctor
- Desmond Davies as aide
- Edward Ellis as Arab

== Production ==
Producer Charles Schneer made it after a series of fantasies with Ray Harryhausen. This and Siege of the Saxons were made over 15 days using stock footage. "Columbia had a lot of unused footage in their library", said the producer. "If 10 percent or less of a film made in the United Kingdom was comprised of stock footage, you received a government subsidy. I decided that would be a good commercial opportunity, so I made both pictures that way. I took the big action sequences out of Columbia's library." The action sequences of East of Sudan used stock footage from Beyond Mombassa, Odongo and Safari (all 1956), and The Four Feathers (1939).

Anthony Quayle and Sylvia Syms were signed in February 1964. It was Quayle's first film since Lawrence of Arabia, and the film debut of Jenny Agutter, then aged eleven. Syms and Quayle had appeared in a number of films together.

== Release ==
The film was released in both the US and the UK on a double bill with First Men in the Moon (1964), also directed by Juran.

== Reception ==
The Monthly Film Bulletin called it "shamelessly unoriginal hokum with Anthony Quayle as a poor man's Stewart Granger and Sylvia Syms as a ditto Deborah Kerr, some laboured tongue-in-cheek humour and an inordinate amount of stockpile animal footage. Nathan Juran could direct this sort of thing blindfolded and for once would appear to have done so."

Variety wrote: "Plenty of action in this workmanlike dualler, but not much overseas star appeal and much of the effect of the pic is lost because of its obvious studio setting. There is none of the stench and steam of the jungle and though special effects man Ted Samuels has contributed some useful tricks the whole affair is artificial. There is a lot of obvious processing, back projection and stock animal shots. The easy-going cinema patron will not worry unduly, however, and be satisfied with the vicarious kick of sharing the actors' adventurous trek from Batash down the river to Khartoum."

In The Radio Times Guide to Films Adrian Turner gave the film 2/5 stars, writing: "This lacklustre adventure is about a group who escape an outpost in the Sudan. The central characters are army regular Anthony Quayle and governess Sylvia Syms, and their relationship forms the subplot in this piece of hokum. Director Nathan Juran had the good sense to use British cameraman Wilkie Cooper on five films including this one and his contribution, in colour and Techniscope, enhances a rather dull movie."
