= A Stoning in Fulham County =

- Written by: Jackson Gillis; Jud Kinberg
- Directed by: Larry Elikann
- Composer: Don Davis
- Country of origin: United States
- Original language: English

Production
- Executive producers: Joan Barnett; Alan Landsburg; Howard Lipstone
- Producers: Michael Criscuolo; Jud Kinberg
- Production locations: Statesville, North Carolina; Mooresville, North Carolina
- Cinematography: Laszlo George
- Editor: Peter V. White
- Running time: 94 minutes
- Production company: The Landsburg Company

Original release
- Network: NBC
- Release: October 24, 1988

A Stoning in Fulham County is a 1988 television film directed by Larry Elikann. It takes place in fictional Fulham County, North Carolina. It is based on the true story of the murder of an Amish baby by a group of reckless teens in Indiana in 1979.

== Plot ==
An Amish family is returning home from a gathering when a group of reckless local teens drives past them in a red pickup truck. They shout insults and throw rocks at the family. A rock hits the seven-month-old baby of the family, causing family patriarch Jacob (Ron Perlman) to borrow a nearby neighbor's phone to call for an ambulance. The baby dies, and county prosecutor Jim Sandler (Ken Olin) decides to investigate and prosecute for reckless homicide.

To his frustration, he finds that the Amish family takes Biblical commandments to "turn the other cheek" and that "vengeance belongs to the Lord" literally and as forbidding to help civil authorities punish those who hurt them. Therefore, the prosecutor must work to persuade them to speak up about what happened so that future harassment and aggression against the Amish community will cease.

== Cast ==
- Ron Perlman as Jacob Shuler
- Ken Olin as Jim Sandler
- Jill Eikenberry as Susan
- Gregg Henry as Sheriff Woodman
- Nicholas Pryor as Baxter
- Brad Pitt as Teddy Johnson
- Michael Criscuolo as Philip Carr
