= Maurice Rootes =

British film editor (1917–1997)

Maurice Clifford Rootes (12 April 1917 – 17 June 1997) was a British film editor.

== Filmography ==
- Escape from Broadmoor (1948)
- The Last Days of Dolwyn (1949)
- Maria Chapdelaine (1950)
- A Tale of Five Cities (1951)
- The Last Page (1952)
- The Gambler and the Lady (1952)
- Four Sided Triangle (1953)
- Spaceways (1953)
- Blood Orange (1953)
- Face the Music (1954)
- Murder by Proxy (1954)
- Windfall (1955)
- Abdulla the Great (1955)
- Reluctant Bride (1955)
- One Way Out (1955)
- Three Crooked Men (1958)
- A Woman of Mystery (1958)
- On the Run (1958)
- A Woman Possessed (1958)
- The Day (1960, short)
- She Knows Y'Know (1962)
- Jason and the Argonauts (1963)
- Siege of the Saxons (1963)
- Clash by Night (1963)
- First Men in the Moon (1964)
- Custer of the West (1967)
- Krakatoa: East of Java (1969)
