= Charles H. Schneer =

American film producer (1920–2009)

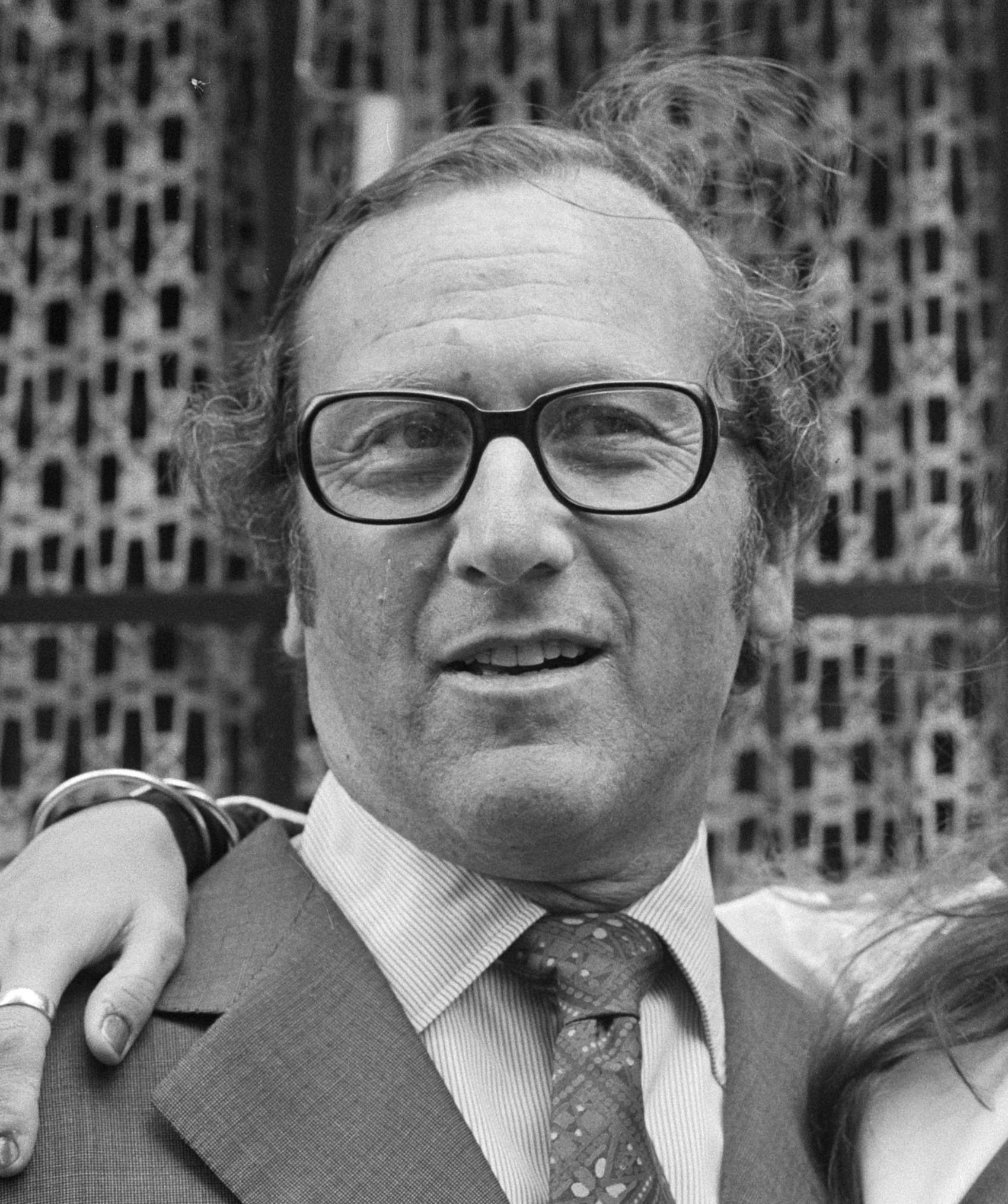
Charles H. Schneer in 1974

Charles Hirsch Schneer (May 5, 1920 – January 21, 2009) was an American film producer and writer, best known for the 12 films he produced with stop motion animator and special effects creator Ray Harryhausen from 1955-1981. He is credited with coining the term "Dynamation" to describe the advanced form of stop motion model animation Harryhausen developed, which resulted in superior compositing of animated and live action elements than had previously been possible.

== Life and career ==
Born in Norfolk, Virginia, he graduated from Columbia University in 1940. Serving in the U.S. Army's Signal Corps Photographic Unit during the War, he moved to Hollywood following demobilization.

=== Sam Katzman ===
Schneer joined Columbia Pictures, where he wrote the script for the Robin Hood film The Prince of Thieves (1948) for Sam Katzman. He later adapted Byron's The Corsair for Katzman but it was not made.

Schneer was credited as associate producer on Katzman's The 49th Man (1953).

Schneer worked as a producer on the TV series The Web (1954)

=== Ray Harryhausen ===
Schneer was introduced to Harryhausen by a mutual friend from Schneer's period in the Army.

Together the two men created It Came from Beneath the Sea (1955) (originally Monster from Beneath the Sea), about a giant octopus that wreaks havoc on the Golden Gate Bridge. To save money, the octopus had only six tentacles, which Schneer is reported to have been correct in claiming no one would notice. This film made use of stop-motion photography which the two men were to use to greater effect in later films.

"He was a typical producer", Harryhausen says, "although he didn’t smoke big black cigars." Schneer would produce all Harryhausen's films except One Million Years B.C. (1967).

Harryhausen and Scheer next worked together on Earth vs. the Flying Saucers (1957) which Schneer produced.

=== Morningside Productions ===
In 1956, it was announced Schneer was considering joining RKO but changed his mind and signed a new three-picture deal with Columbia for his Morningside Productions.

Schneer made the romantic drama Hellcats of the Navy (1957) with Ronald Reagan and his wife (billed as Nancy Davis); it was the first time Schneer worked with director Nathan H. Juran. He followed it with 20 Million Miles to Earth (1958) with Harryhausen, directed by Juran.

In March 1957 Schneer signed a new three pictures deal with Columbia. He produced a noir, The Case Against Brooklyn (1958), and a war film, Tarawa Beachhead (1958), both directed by Paul Wendkos. More popular than either was The 7th Voyage of Sinbad (1958) with Harryhausen, directed by Juran and starring Kerwin Mathews, who had been in Tarawa.

Schneer made two Westerns with Fred MacMurray, Good Day for a Hanging (1959) (directed by Juran) and Face of a Fugitive (1959) (directed by Wendkos).

In May 1959 it was announced Schneer would make nine films for Columbia, including Battle of the Coral Sea, I Aim at the Stars, Mysterious Island, Gulliver's Travels and Air Force Academy. He started the new contract with Battle of the Coral Sea (1960), directed by Wendkos. Air Force Academy was never made.

=== London ===
In 1960, Schneer moved his base of operations to London, where he remained for 45 years. He produced a biopic of Wernher von Braun, I Aim at the Stars (1960), directed by J. Lee Thompson, and the fantasy The 3 Worlds of Gulliver (1961), starring Kerwin Matthews.

Mysterious Island (1961), directed by Cy Endfield was an adaptation of the Jules Verne novel, with Harryhausen effects. Gentleman to China with Lloyd Nolan was announced but never made.

Schneer had one of his biggest successes with Jason and the Argonauts (1963), again with Harryhausen; the screenwriter was Beverley Cross who worked with Schneer on many future projects.

Schneer produced a medieval swashbuckler, Siege of the Saxons (1963) then an Imperial adventure, East of Sudan (1963), both directed by Juran. He was reunited with Harryhausen for First Men in the Moon (1964), also from Juran.

Schneer produced a "swinging sixties" comedy directed by Michael Winner, You Must Be Joking! (1965), and the film version of the stage musical Half a Sixpence (1967) starring Tommy Steele. Fifth Paw of the Lion was announced but not made.

In Spain, he produced a Western, Land Raiders (1970), then returned to fantasy for The Valley of Gwangi (1969), with Harryhausen. The Executioner (1970), directed by Sam Wanamaker was a thriller.

=== Later Films ===
Schneer made three more films with Harryhausen: The Golden Voyage of Sinbad (1973), directed by Gordon Hessler; Sinbad and the Eye of the Tiger (1977), directed by Wanamaker; and Clash of the Titans (1981), directed by Desmond Davis.

Harryhausen later said the secret to his success with Schneer was "never agreeing... We were together for a long time. Charles always had a great sympathy for fantasy. We had many disagreements, which brings up that old saying, "if two people think exactly alike, one of them is unnecessary." So we battled out many things in the name of the film, and in the end we'd come to a compromise."

Schneer died in Boca Raton, Florida, aged 88.

== Filmography ==
- Clash of the Titans (1981)
- Sinbad and the Eye of the Tiger (1977)
- The Golden Voyage of Sinbad (1974)
- The Greeks Have a New Word (1970)
- The Executioner (1970)
- Land Raiders (1970)
- The Valley of Gwangi (1969)
- Half a Sixpence (1967)
- You Must Be Joking! (1965)
- First Men in the Moon (1964)
- East of Sudan (1964) - uncredited
- Siege of the Saxons (1963)
- Jason and the Argonauts (1963)
- Mysterious Island (1961)
- The 3 Worlds of Gulliver (1960)
- I Aim at the Stars (1960)
- Battle of the Coral Sea (1959)
- Face of a Fugitive (1959)
- Good Day for a Hanging (1959)
- The 7th Voyage of Sinbad (1958)
- Tarawa Beachhead (1958)
- The Case Against Brooklyn (1958)
- Hellcats of the Navy (1957)
- 20 Million Miles to Earth (1957)
- Earth vs. the Flying Saucers (1956)
- It Came from Beneath the Sea (1955)
- The 49th Man (1953)

== Notes ==
- Swires, Steve (January 1990). "Mentor to the Magicks Part One". Starlog. No. 150. p. 57–72.
- Swires, Steve (February 1990). "Mentor to the Magicks Part Two". Starlog. p. 65–68,70.
- Swirds, Steve (March 1990). "Mentor to the Magicks Part Three". Starlog. p. 65–68,71.
