= Nathan Juran =

American film director (1907–2002)

- Juran on the set of Land Raiders, 1969
- Born: September 1, 1907; Gura Humorului, Kingdom of Romania
- Died: October 23, 2002 (aged 95); Palos Verdes, California, United States
- Occupation: Film art director
- Known for: Oscar for Best Art Direction in 1942
- Notable work: How Green Was My Valley

Naftuli Hertz "Nathan" Juran (September 1, 1907 – October 23, 2002) was a Romanian-born film art director, and later film and television director. As an art director, he won the Oscar for Best Art Direction in 1942 for How Green Was My Valley, along with Richard Day and Thomas Little. His work on The Razor's Edge in 1946 also received an Academy nomination. In the 1950s, he began to direct, and was known for science fiction and fantasy films such as Attack of the 50 Foot Woman. He was the brother of quality guru Joseph M. Juran.

== Life and career ==
=== Early life ===
Juran was born to a Jewish family in Gura Humorului, Kingdom of Romania .

In 1912, he emigrated to America with his family, settling in Minneapolis. He earned a bachelor's degree in Architecture from the University of Minnesota. He also spent a summer studying at the École des Beaux-Arts before earning a master's degree in Architecture from the Massachusetts Institute of Technology. He passed the architect's exam and set up his own office as an architect.

=== Art department ===
With the construction industry at a standstill due to the Great Depression, Juran moved to Los Angeles. He sought architecture work at the studios and got a job doing a drawing of the Brooklyn Bridge for RKO Radio Pictures. He managed to get a permanent job as a draftsman in the art department. He was an assistant art director on Quality Street (1937).

Juaran later moved to MGM, where he assisted in designing Juliet's bedroom in Romeo and Juliet (1936). He then joined 20th Century Fox, assisting art department head Richard Day on How Green Was My Valley (1941).

Fox liked his work and put Juran under contract. His early credits as art director included Charley's American Aunt (1941), and Belle Starr (1941), and he and Day won an Oscar for their work on Valley.

Juran also worked on I Wake Up Screaming (1941), A Gentleman at Heart (1942), Ten Gentlemen from West Point (1942), The Loves of Edgar Allan Poe (1942), Dr. Renault's Secret (1942), It's Everybody's War (1942, a short), and That Other Woman (1942).

Juran enlisted in the Navy during the Second World War in July 1942 and was assigned to first the Office of Strategic Services and then to the Royal Air Force Intelligence Center.

After the war, Juran returned to Fox, winning an Oscar nomination for his work on The Razor's Edge (1946).

Juran accepted a seven-year contract to be head of the art department for Enterprise Productions. While there he was credited on The Other Love (1947) and Body and Soul (1947). When Enterprise collapsed, Juran did Kiss the Blood Off My Hands (1948) for Harold Hecht and Tulsa (1948) for Walter Wanger.

=== Universal ===
Juran then signed a long-term contract with Universal, where he was the art director on Free for All (1949), Undertow (1949), Winchester '73 (1950), Deported (1950), Harvey (1950), Bright Victory (1951), Thunder on the Hill (1951), Reunion in Reno (1951), Cave of Outlaws (1951), The Strange Door (1951), Meet Danny Wilson (1951), Bend of the River (1952) and Untamed Frontier (1952).

=== Director ===
Juran was assigned as art department head for The Black Castle (1952), when director Joseph Pevney dropped out shortly before filming. Juran was asked to take over as director two weeks prior to filming.

Universal was happy with Juran's work and signed him to a one-year directing contract. He made an Audie Murphy Western Gunsmoke (1952), and a Ronald Reagan Western Law and Order (1953), then did The Golden Blade (1953), an "Eastern" with Rock Hudson and Tumbleweed (1953) with Murphy.

Juran went to Italy in 1954 to direct a swashbuckler, Knights of the Queen (1954), based on The Three Musketeers. He then directed some episodes of a TV series based on the movie.

Juran returned to Hollywood to direct an independent film, Highway Dragnet (1954) based on a story by Roger Corman. After The Big Moment (1954) at Paramount he went back to Universal to do Drums Across the River (1954) with Murphy.

Juran directed episodes of Fury (1954), Crossroads and My Friend Flicka on TV, and The Crooked Web (1955) for Sam Katzman at Columbia.

=== Science fiction and fantasy ===
Juran's first science fiction film was The Deadly Mantis (1957) at Universal. He followed this with Hellcats of the Navy (1957) starring Ronald Reagan and his wife (who was billed as Nancy Davis). It was his first film for producer Charles H. Schneer. Schneer hired Juran for 20 Million Miles to Earth (1957) with special effects by Ray Harryhausen. This film established Juran in the science fiction and fantasy genres.

Schneer hired him to do another movie with Harryhausen, The 7th Voyage of Sinbad (1957). It was a commercial and critical success. Instead of continuing with A features, he accepted two jobs "for the money", in his own words: The Brain from Planet Arous (1957) then Attack of the 50 Foot Woman (1957). Both became cult classics. He was unhappy with how Arous turned out and arranged for his billing to be "Nathan Hertz".

Juran did a Western for Schneer, Good Day for a Hanging (1958) and, for TV, episodes of Frances Langford Presents, World of Giants, and Men Into Space (1960).

Juran got back into features with a motion picture he wrote himself, Jack the Giant Killer (1962) for producer Edward Small. He then did Flight of the Lost Balloon (1961), which was released first, an adventure heavily influenced by Jules Verne, which he co-wrote and directed. Around this time he provided the stories for, but did not direct, Doctor Blood's Coffin (1961) and Boy Who Caught a Crook (1961) and wrote a draft of Son of Captain Blood.

Juran did some second unit directing on MGM's Mutiny on the Bounty (1962). Schneer hired Juran to direct Siege of the Saxons (1963) and First Men in the Moon (1964) (based on the novel by H. G. Wells with effects by Harryhausen). He did an imperial adventure for Schneer, East of Sudan (1964) and directed second unit on Cyrano et d'Artagnan (1964).

=== Television ===
Juran turned to television in 1959. He directed episodes of A Man Called Shenandoah and Daniel Boone, and episodes of all four of Irwin Allen's 1960s science fiction series Voyage to the Bottom of the Sea, Lost in Space, The Time Tunnel and Land of the Giants.

=== Last films and return to architecture ===
He did a feature for Schneer, Land Raiders (1970), a Western, before an operation for cancer prompted him to retire in 1970. Juran returned from retirement to direct The Boy Who Cried Werewolf (1973) with his old Sinbad star, Kerwin Mathews. He then returned to his first career, architecture.

In 1999, he was honored with the Lifetime Career Award by the Academy of Science Fiction, Fantasy and Horror Films, USA.

He died at the age of 95 in Palos Verdes, California, US.

== Partial filmography ==
As art director

- How Green Was My Valley (1942)
- The Razor's Edge (1946)

As director

- The Black Castle (1952)
- Law and Order (1953)
- Gunsmoke (1953)
- The Golden Blade (1953)
- Tumbleweed (1953)
- Drums Across the River (1954)
- Highway Dragnet (1954)
- The Crooked Web (1955)
- The Deadly Mantis (1957)
- 20 Million Miles to Earth (1957)
- Hellcats of the Navy (1957)
- The Brain from Planet Arous (1957)
- The 7th Voyage of Sinbad (1958)
- Attack of the 50 Foot Woman (1958)
- Good Day for a Hanging (1959)
- Flight of the Lost Balloon (1961)
- Boy Who Caught a Crook (1961)
- Jack the Giant Killer (1962)
- Siege of the Saxons (1963)
- First Men in the Moon (1964)
- East of Sudan (1964)
- Land Raiders (1970)
- The Boy Who Cried Werewolf (1973)
