= Land Raiders (film) =

1970 film by Nathan Juran

- Original film poster
- Directed by: Nathan Juran (as Nathan H. Juran)
- Screenplay by: Ken Pettus
- Story by: Ken Pettus; Jesse Lasky Jr. Pat Silver-Lasky
- Produced by: Charles H. Schneer
- Starring: Telly Savalas; George Maharis; Arlene Dahl; Janet Landgard
- Cinematography: Wilkie Cooper
- Edited by: Archie Lusky (as A. Ludski)
- Music by: Bruno Nicolai
- Color process: Technicolor
- Production company: Morningside Productions
- Distributed by: Columbia Pictures
- Release dates: January 1970 (United States); June 17, 1970 (Dayton, Ohio)
- Running time: 101 minutes
- Country: United States
- Language: English

Land Raiders is a 1969 American Western film directed by Nathan Juran and starring Telly Savalas, George Maharis, Arlene Dahl, and Janet Landgard. It was produced by Charles H. Schneer, who was best known for producing most of Ray Harryhausen's features, three of which were also directed by Juran.

== Plot ==
In the 1870s Arizona town of Forge River, cattle baron Vince Carden (Telly Savalas) is estranged from his brother, Paul (George Maharis). The men are of Mexican ancestry, but Vince has renounced that part of his heritage. Vince hates Native Americans and pays out bounties on Indian scalps, then benefits financially by being able to buy up the cheap land caused by the strife and bloodshed. Paul is rudderless, haunted by a past romance that ended with the death of his lover, for which some people think he was responsible.

A wagon train joined by Paul is attacked by braves in retaliation for a raid that was fomented by Vince. The only survivor besides Paul is a woman returning home from her education back east. Later, Vince arranges to murder a negotiator sent from Washington, DC, to arrange a land-sharing agreement with the Indians, in a manner for which the Indians will be blamed. Paul witnesses the attack, but when the townspeople gather to decide what to do about it, he does not explicitly tell them what he saw.

Vince urges an all-out attack on a largely defenseless Indian village. The town sheriff is on Vince's payroll, and the commander of the nearby fort goes along with Vince's plan. The massacre that follows prompts a massive retaliatory assault on Forge River by the Indians, who somehow know that Vince's machinations are responsible for their woes.

== Cast ==
- Telly Savalas as Vince Cardenas
- George Maharis as Paul Cardenas
- Arlene Dahl as Martha Cardenas
- Janet Landgard as Kate Mayfield
- Guy Rolfe as Major Tanner
- Paul Picerni as Carney / Arturo (credited as H.P. Picerni)
- Phil Brown as Sheriff John Mayfield
- George Coulouris as Cardenas
- Jocelyn Lane as Luisa Rojas
- Fernando Rey as Priet
- Robert Carricart as Julio Rojas
- John Clark as "Ace"
- Charles Stalnaker as Frank Willis
- Marcella St. Amant as Luisa Montoya
- Gustavo Rojo as Indio
