= Jud Kinberg =

American film producer and screenwriter (1925–2016)

Jud Kinberg (July 7, 1925 – November 2, 2016) was an American film producer and screenwriter. He was nominated for a Golden Globe for his work as a producer on The Collector.

His son is the screenwriter and director Simon Kinberg.

== Life and work ==
Kinberg was born in Brooklyn, New York. He attended the University of North Carolina and earned a Purple Heart and a Silver Star for his service with the U.S. Army during World War II.

Kinberg briefly worked in advertising until being recruited to apprentice under producer-actor John Houseman. Together they went on to produce films at MGM including Julius Caesar (1953), starring Marlon Brando; Executive Suite (1954), directed by Robert Wise; Her Twelve Men (1954), featuring Greer Garson and Robert Ryan; Vincente Minnelli's The Cobweb (1955), toplined by Richard Widmark and Lauren Bacall; Moonfleet (1955), helmed by Fritz Lang; and Lust for Life (1956), which received four Oscar nominations.

In 1978 he was nominated for an Emmy for producing Quincy M.E., the NBC drama starring Jack Klugman as a coroner who investigates suspicious deaths. Later in his career, he worked on TV movies To Catch a Killer, A Stoning in Fulham County, and Kane & Abel.

Kinberg married actress Suzanne Dalbert in 1953. He died at 91 of natural causes in his New York City home.

== Selected filmography ==
The films Kinberg worked on include:

Producer

- 1954: Executive Suite
- 1954: Her Twelve Men
- 1955: The Cobweb
- 1955: Moonfleet
- 1956: Lust for Life
- 1965: The Collector
- 1968: The Magus
- 1973: Story of a Love Story

Scriptwriter

- 1963: Siege of the Saxons
- 1964: East of Sudan
- 1972: Vampire Circus

Television

- 1981: The Million Dollar Face
- 1988: A Stoning in Fulham County
- 1992: In the Best Interest of the Children
- 1992: To Catch a Killer
