= Wilkie Cooper =

British cinematographer (1911–2001)

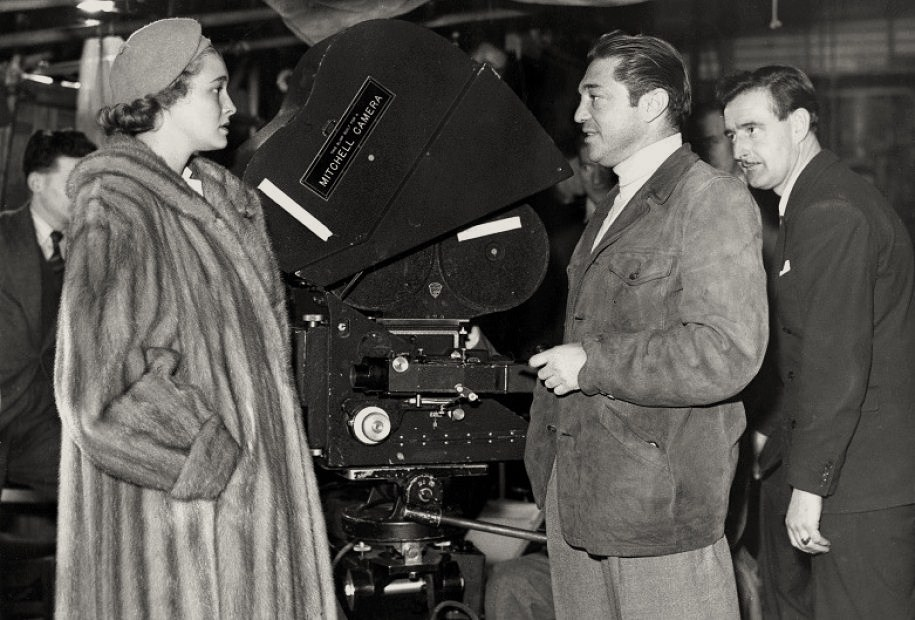
On set of The Hasty Heart (1949), L-R: Patricia Neal, Vincent Sherman (director) and Wilkie Cooper

Wilkie Cooper BSC (19 October 1911 – 15 December 2001) was a British cinematographer.

Cooper was born in London, the son of the silent era cinematographer Douglas Percival Cooper. His early career included Green for Danger (1946) and London Belongs to Me (1948) for producer-director team Frank Launder and Sidney Gilliat, Stage Fright (1950) for Alfred Hitchcock, and Undercover (1943) for Ealing Studios. He worked with Jack Cardiff on Web of Evidence (1956), a thriller starring Van Johnson and Vera Miles and worked with J. Lee Thompson on the Wernher von Braun biopic I Aim at the Stars (1960). He co-produced Sea of Sand (1958) with Monty Berman.

He forged a partnership with special effects maestro Ray Harryhausen in later years, photographing several of his productions, including The 7th Voyage of Sinbad (1958), Jason and the Argonauts (1963) and First Men in the Moon (1964).

Cooper retired in 1972. He was married to actress Peggy Bryan, whom he outlived. They had two sons. For many years he resided in a seafront flat overlooking the sea in Ferring, West Sussex.

== Selected filmography ==
- Call of the Blood (1949)
- It's a Wonderful World (1956)
- Port Afrique (1956)
- Land Raiders (1970)
