= Jason and the Argonauts (film) =

1963 film by Don Chaffey

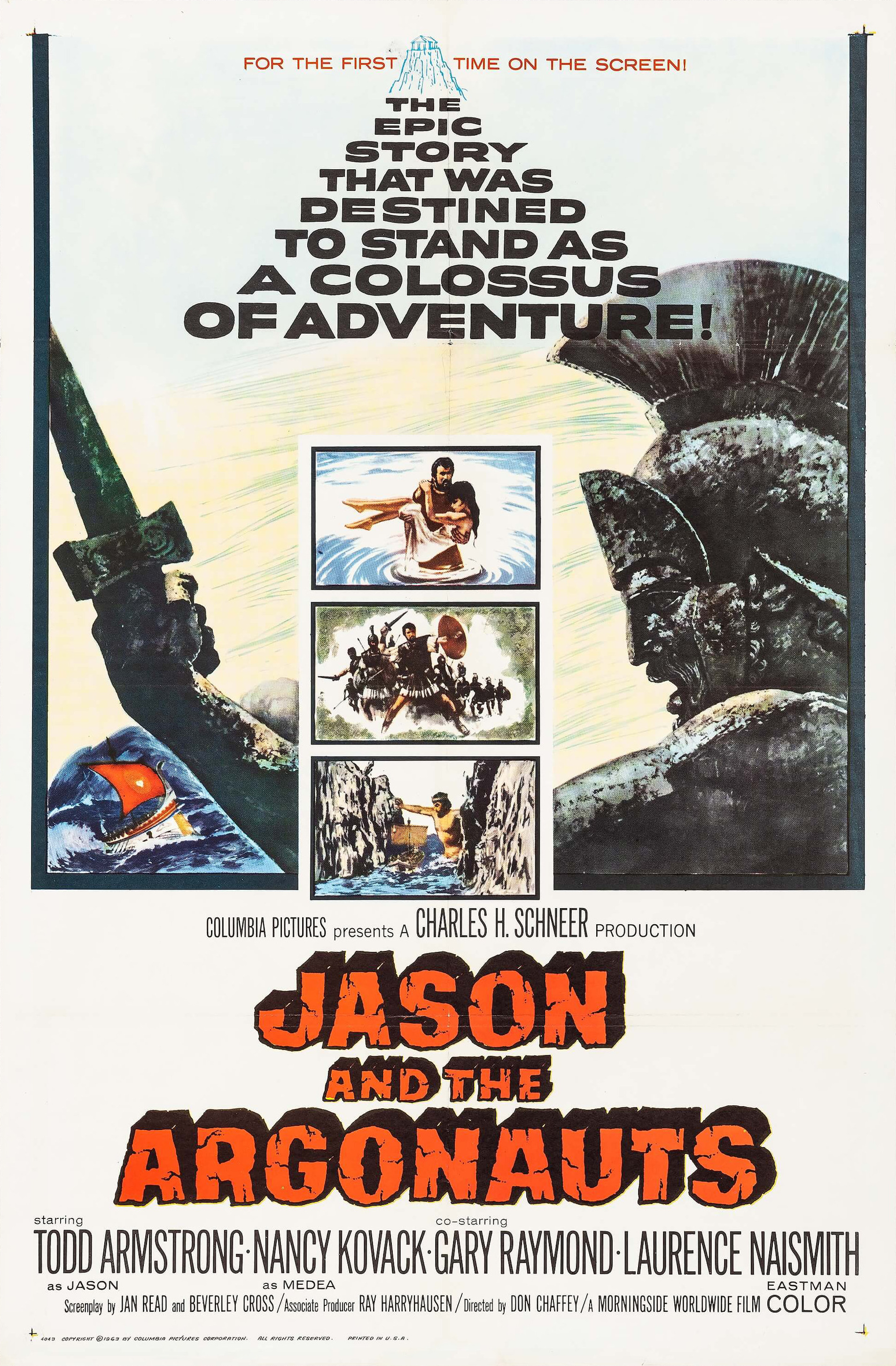
- Theatrical release poster by Howard Terpning
- Directed by: Don Chaffey
- Written by: Beverley Cross; Jan Read
- Based on: The Argonautica by Apollonius Rhodius
- Produced by: Charles H. Schneer
- Starring: Todd Armstrong; Nancy Kovack; Gary Raymond; Laurence Naismith
- Cinematography: Wilkie Cooper
- Edited by: Maurice Rootes
- Music by: Bernard Herrmann
- Production company: Morningside Productions
- Distributed by: Columbia Pictures
- Release date: June 13, 1963
- Running time: 104 minutes
- Countries: United States; United Kingdom
- Language: English
- Budget: $3 million
- Box office: $2.1 million (rentals)

Jason and the Argonauts (working title: Jason and the Golden Fleece) is a 1963 epic fantasy adventure film loosely based on the 3rd century BC Greek epic poem The Argonautica by Apollonius Rhodius. Distributed by Columbia Pictures, it was produced by Charles H. Schneer, directed by Don Chaffey, and stars Todd Armstrong, Nancy Kovack, Gary Raymond, and Laurence Naismith.

Shot in Eastman Color, the film was made in collaboration with stop-motion animation visual effects artist Ray Harryhausen and is known for its various legendary creatures, notably the iconic fight scene featuring seven skeleton warriors. Although it was a box office disappointment during its initial release, the film was critically acclaimed and later considered a classic.

The film score was composed by Bernard Herrmann, who had partnered with Harryhausen on The 7th Voyage of Sinbad (1958), The 3 Worlds of Gulliver (1960), and Mysterious Island (1961).

== Plot ==
Pelias usurps the throne of Thessaly, killing King Aristo. A prophecy states that one of Aristo's children will avenge him. Aristo's infant son Jason is spirited away by a soldier. Pelias slays one of Aristo's daughters after she seeks sanctuary in the temple of the goddess Hera. Because the murder has profaned her temple, Hera becomes Jason's protector. She warns Pelias to beware of "a one-sandaled man".

Twenty years later, Jason saves Pelias from drowning, an "accident" orchestrated by Hera, losing his sandal in the process. Pelias recognizes his enemy. Jason intends to seek the legendary Golden Fleece to rally support against Pelias, not recognizing who he just saved. The king, hoping Jason will die on the quest, encourages him to set forth.

Hermes takes Jason to Mount Olympus to speak with Zeus and Hera. Zeus decrees that Hera can help him only five times, the same number of times that Jason's murdered sister called on her for protection. She directs him to search for the Fleece in the land of Colchis. Zeus offers aid, but Jason declines.

He has a ship built and recruits a crew. Men from all over Greece compete for the honor of joining his quest. The ship is named the Argo after its builder, Argus, so the crew are dubbed the Argonauts. Among them are Hercules and Hylas, as well as Acastus, who was secretly sent by his father Pelias to sabotage the voyage.

When Jason runs low on supplies, Hera guides him to the Isle of Bronze, said to be the foundry of the Gods. The god Hephaestus made armor and weapons for Zeus. Hera reassures Jason that Hephaestus is long gone, but warns him to take only the provisions. However, Hercules steals a brooch pin the size of a javelin from a building filled with treasure and surmounted by a gigantic bronze statue of Talos. The statue comes to life and attacks the Argonauts. Jason again turns to Hera, who tells him to open a large plug at the back of Talos's heel to release its ichor. When Jason does so, Talos topples, crushing Hylas and hiding his body. Hercules refuses to leave until he discovers the fate of his friend. The other Argonauts are unwilling to abandon Hercules, so Jason calls upon Hera again. She informs them that Hylas is dead and that Zeus has other plans for Hercules.

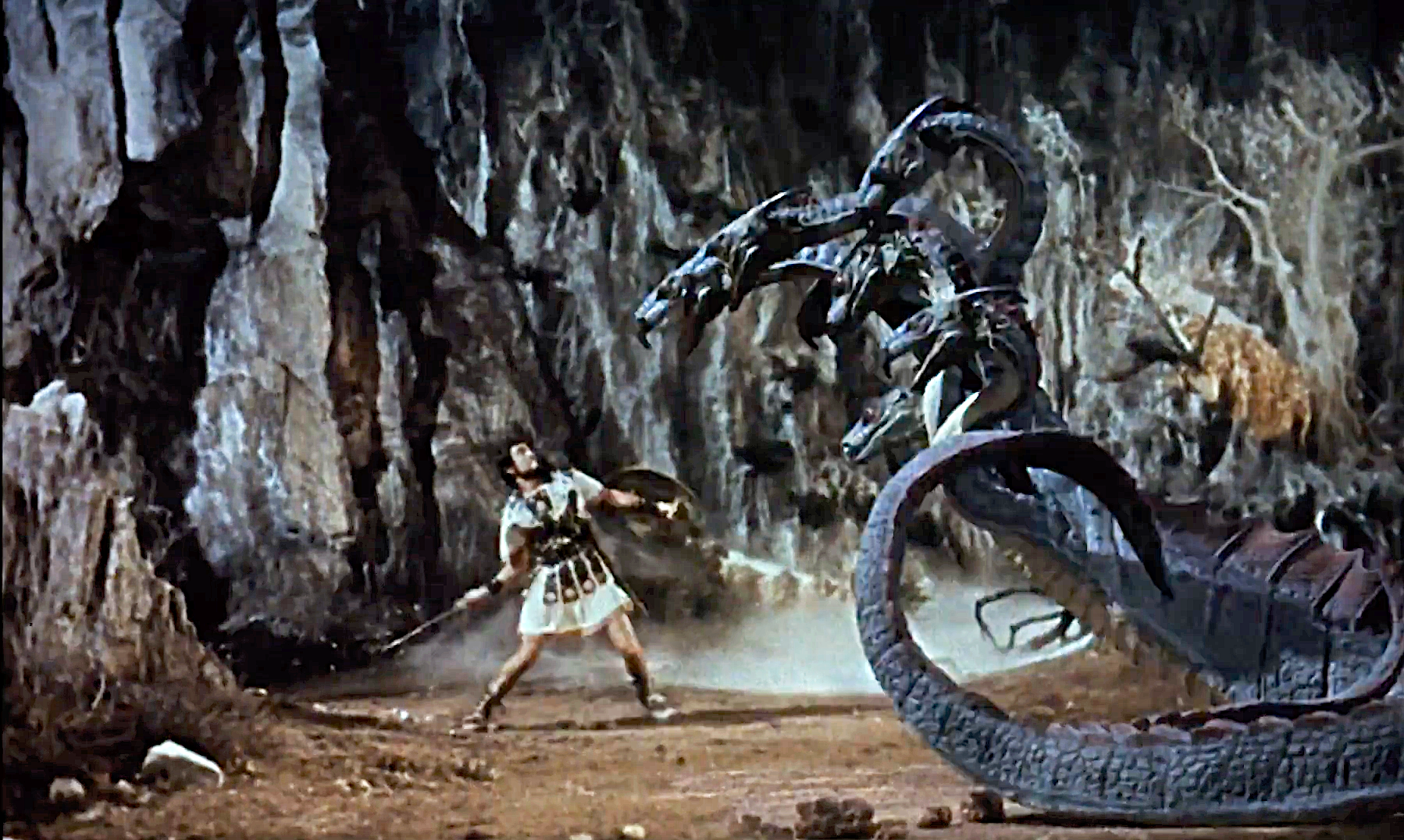
Jason battles the Hydra.

She directs Jason to seek Phineus, who has been blinded and is tormented by Harpies for misusing Zeus's gift of prophecy. After the Argonauts capture and cage the Harpies, Phineus tells them how to reach Colchis, by sailing between the Clashing Rocks. He also gives Jason an amulet of the sea god Triton. The Argonauts see another ship trying to pass through the other way; it is crushed when the Clashing Rocks smash together. When the Argonauts try to row through, they appear to be doomed too. In despair, Jason throws Phineus's amulet into the water, whereupon Triton rises from the water and holds the rocks apart for the Argo to pass. The Argonauts rescue several survivors from the other ship, including Medea, the high priestess of the goddess Hecate in Colchis.

Finally nearing Colchis, Acastus challenges Jason's authority and fights him. Disarmed, Acastus flees, jumping into the sea. After arriving at Colchis, Jason and his men accept an invitation from King Aeëtes to a feast. Unknown to them, Acastus has warned Aeëtes of Jason's quest. Aeëtes has the unwary Argonauts imprisoned, but Medea, having fallen in love with Jason, helps them escape.

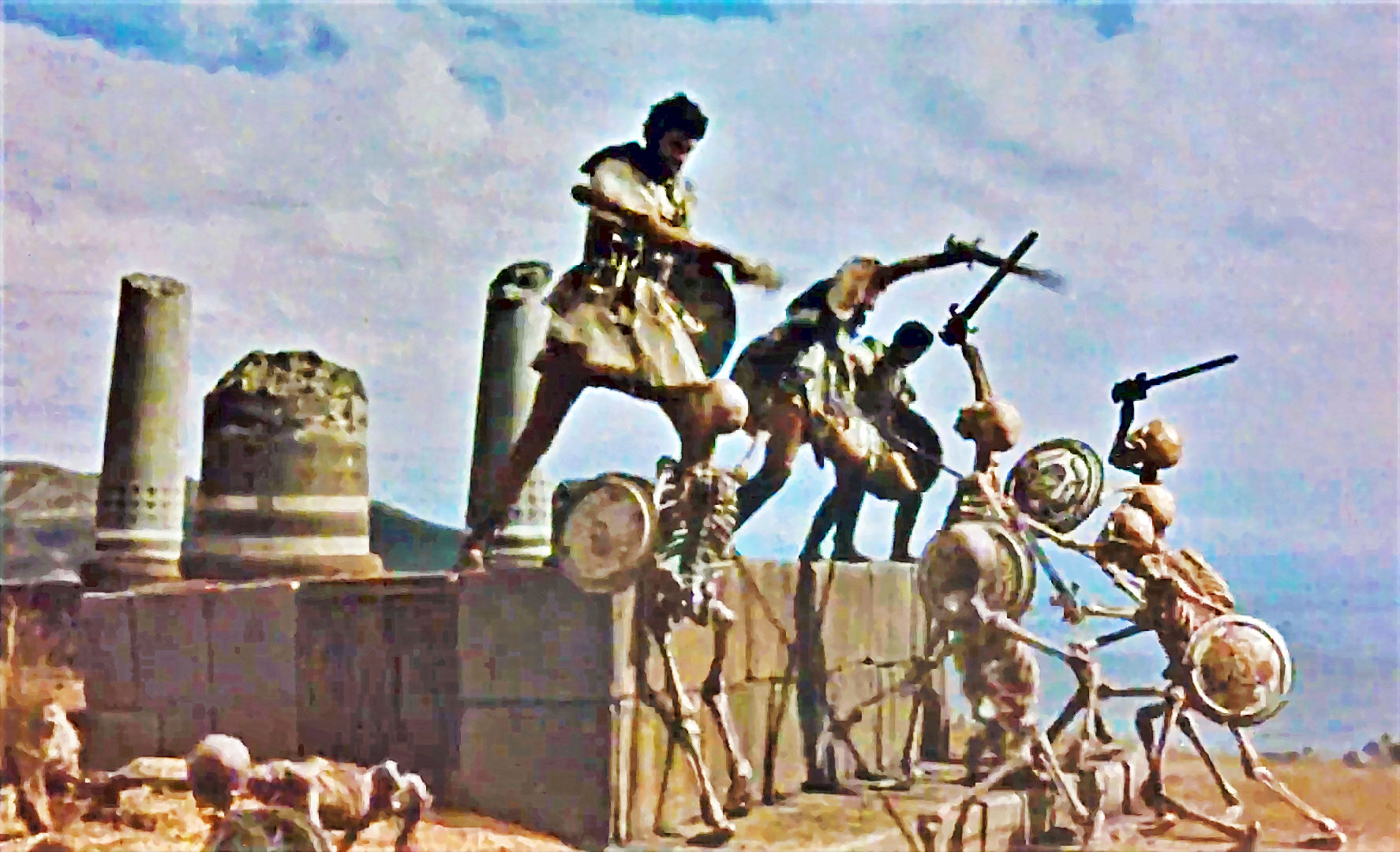
Jason and companions battle the skeleton warriors

Acastus tries to steal the Fleece, but is fatally wounded by its guardian, the Hydra. Jason kills the beast and takes the Fleece. Aeëtes' men wound Medea with an arrow, but Jason heals her with the Fleece. Aeëtes then sows the Hydra's teeth and prays to Hecate. Seven armed skeletons, the "children of the Hydra's teeth", emerge from the ground. Jason, Phalerus and Castor hold them off, while Medea and Argus flee with the Fleece. (Note: It took Ray Harryhausen well over three months to animate the skeleton sequence.) After a prolonged battle, in which his companions are killed, Jason jumps into the sea and swims to the Argo. The Argonauts sail home. On Olympus, Zeus tells Hera that he is not finished with Jason, but admits he is impressed.

== Cast ==
- Todd Armstrong as Jason (dubbed British accent by Tim Turner, uncredited)
- Nancy Kovack as Medea (dubbed British accent by Eva Haddon, uncredited)
- Gary Raymond as Acastus
- Laurence Naismith as Argus
- Niall MacGinnis as Zeus
- Michael Gwynn as Hermes/priest
- Douglas Wilmer as Pelias
- Jack Gwillim as King Aeëtes
- Honor Blackman as Hera
- John Cairney as Hylas
- Patrick Troughton as Phineus
- Andrew Faulds as Phalerus
- Nigel Green as Hercules
- John Crawford as Polydeuces (uncredited)
- Ferdinando Poggi as Castor (uncredited)
- Bill Gudgeon as Triton (uncredited)
- Doug Robinson as Eupaemus (uncredited)
- Davina Taylor as Briseis (uncredited)
- Aldo Cristiani as Lynceus (uncredited)
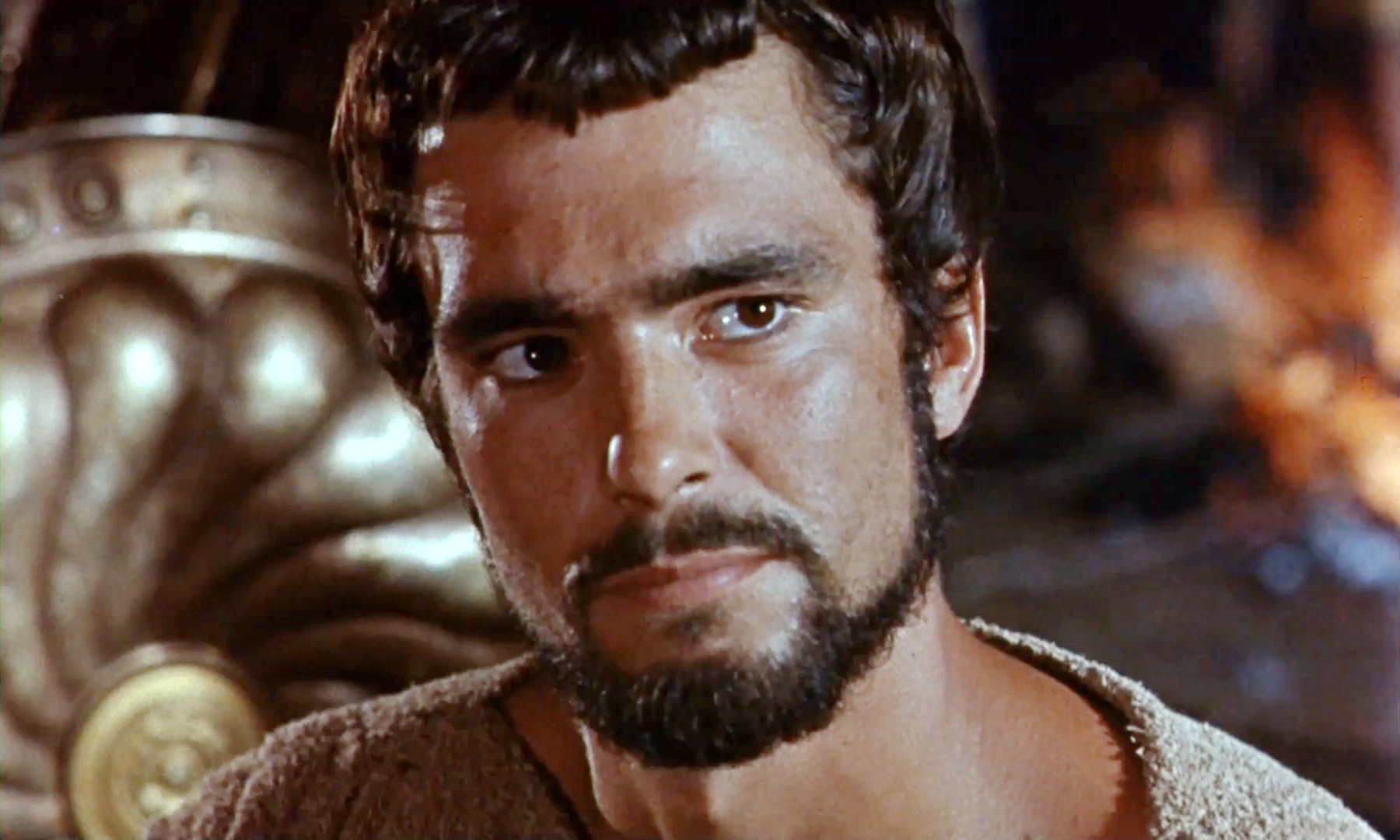
Todd Armstrong as Jason

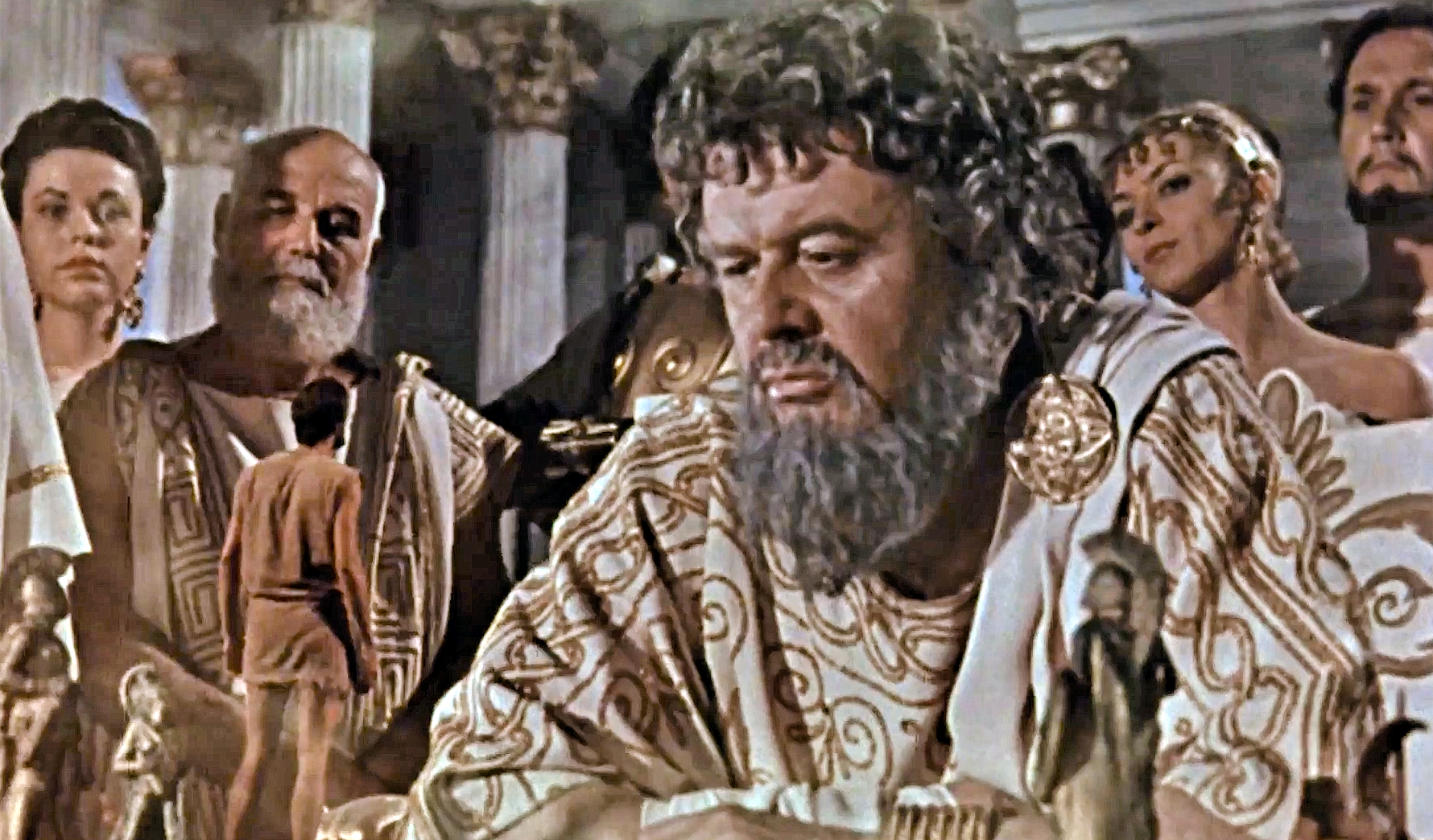
Transported to Mount Olympus, Jason confronts Zeus (Niall MacGinnis), the ruler of the gods

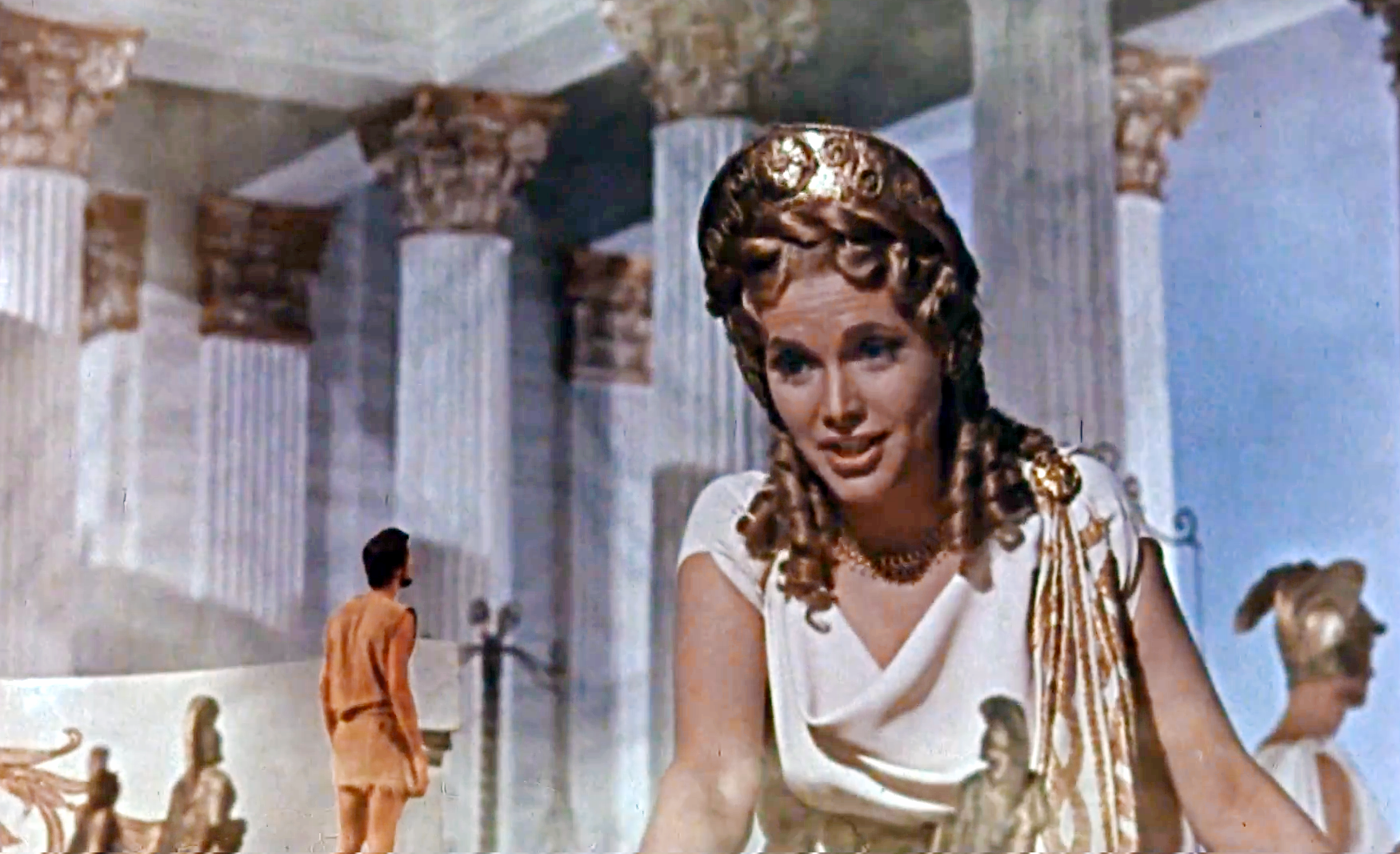
Jason meets his protector, the goddess Hera (Honor Blackman)

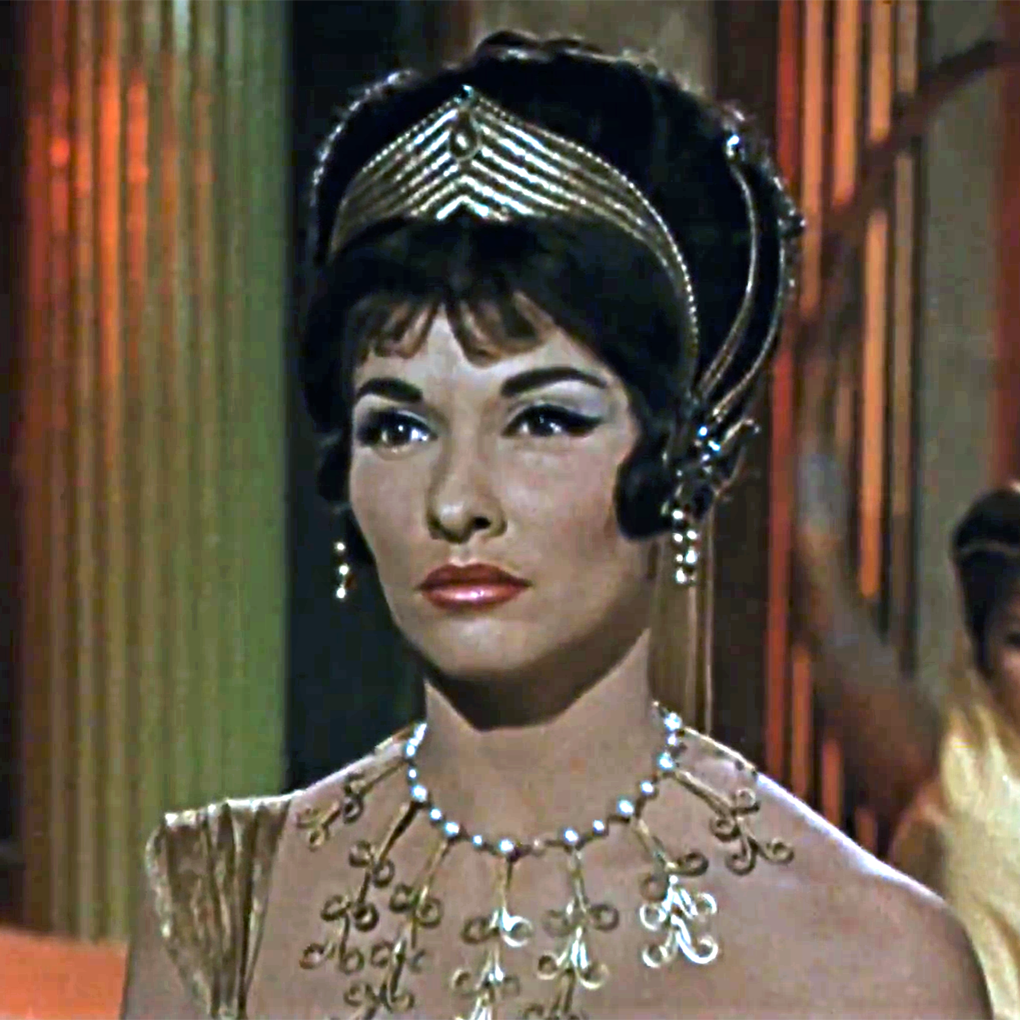
Medea (Nancy Kovack), who falls in love with Jason

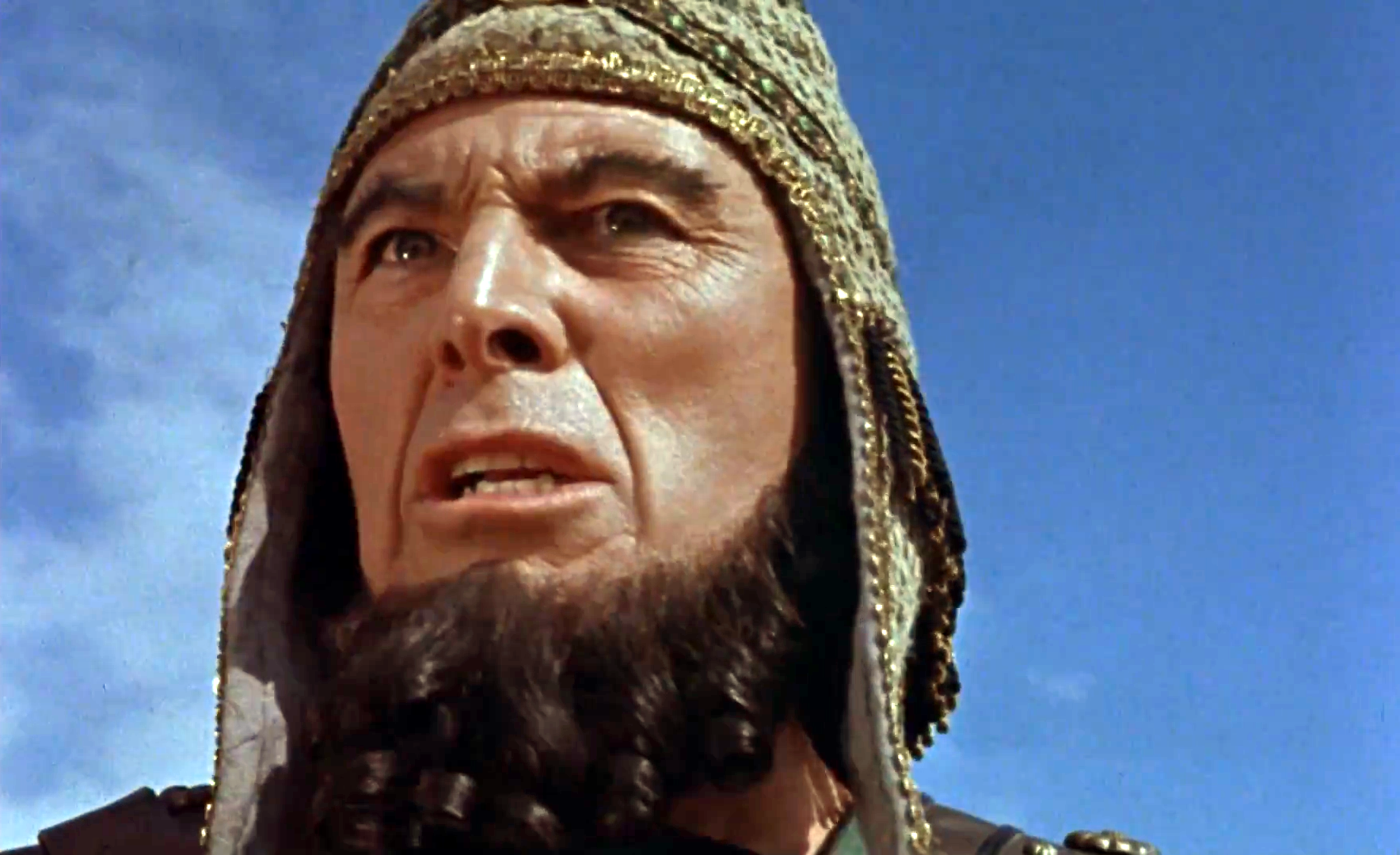
King Aeëtes (Jack Gwillim), who tries to stop Jason from taking the Golden Fleece

== Production ==
=== Film score ===
The film is one of the mythically themed fantasies scored by Bernard Herrmann. Apart from being the composer's fourth collaboration with Ray Harryhausen (The 7th Voyage of Sinbad, The 3 Worlds of Gulliver, and Mysterious Island, made in 1958, 1960, and 1961 respectively), Herrmann also collaborated with Alfred Hitchcock, worked on Citizen Kane (1941), and scored the science fiction films The Day the Earth Stood Still (1951) and Journey to the Center of the Earth (1959).

Contrasting with Herrmann's all-string score for Psycho, the film's soundtrack was made without a string section. This leaves the brass and percussion to perform the heroic fanfares, and the woodwinds along with additional instruments (such as the harp) to dominate in the more subtle and romantic parts.

In 1995, Intrada released a re-recording of the original score. The new version was conducted by American composer/conductor Bruce Broughton, and performed by the Sinfonia of London.

=== Differences from classical mythology ===
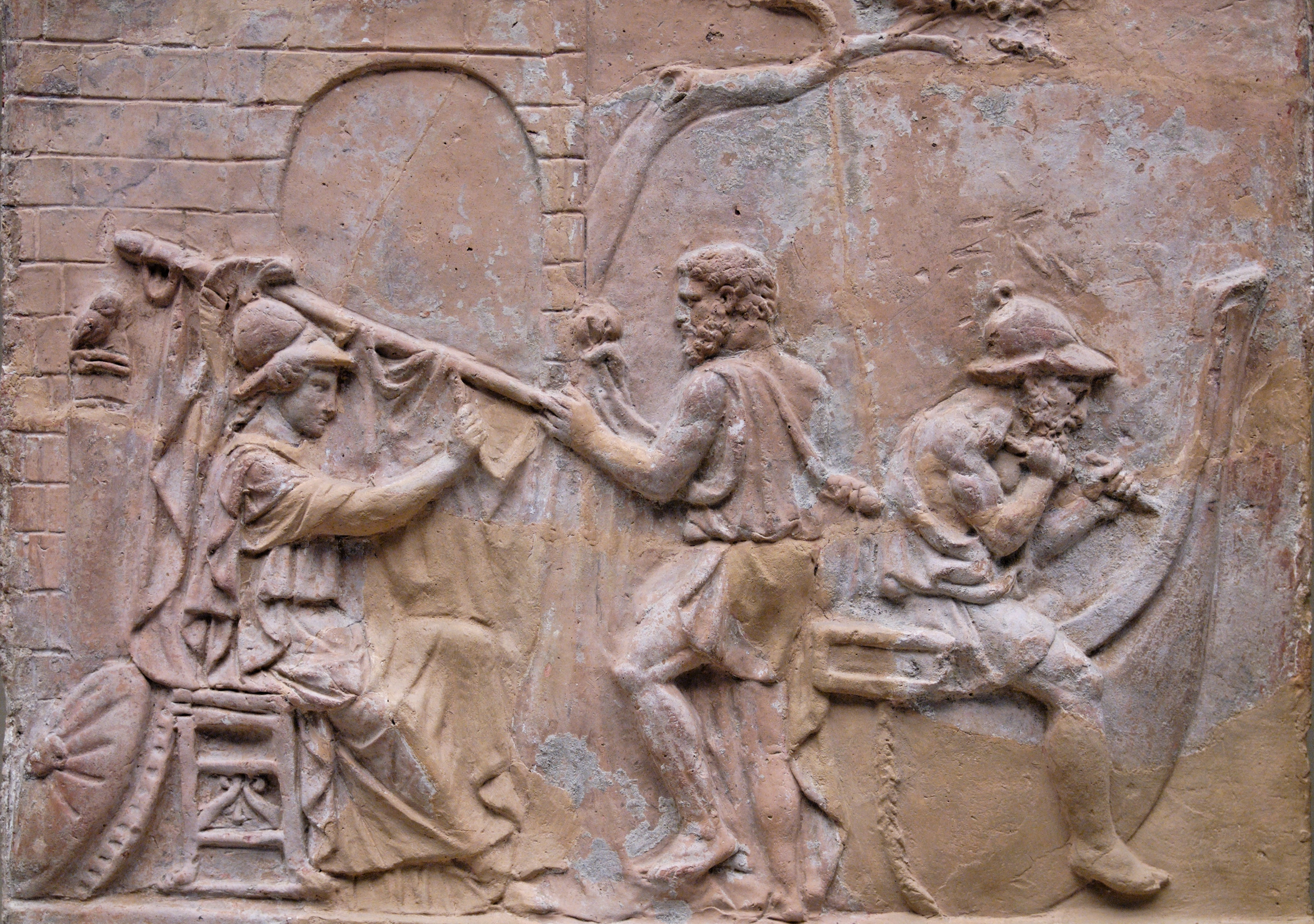
Athena helps build the Argo, Roman moulded terracotta plaque, first century AD

The film differs in some ways from the traditional telling in Greek mythology:

- Pelias does not kill his half-brother, King Aristo (Aeson), (Note: Both share a common mother, Tyro; King Aristo's father is Cretheus, the lawful husband of Tyro, while Pelias' father is the god Poseidon.) but instead had him imprisoned. Eventually, it is Medea, and not Jason, who kills Pelias; she demonstrates to Pelias' daughters that she can rejuvenate an old ram (Note: In some accounts, Medea rejuvenates King Aristo (Aeson).) into a young one by killing, chopping and boiling it in a pot. She promises to do the same for Pelias, so his daughters kill and chop him. However, Medea breaks her word and Pelias remains dead.
- Hera does not attempt to kill Pelias herself by drowning him in the river Anavros. Instead, in order to prove Jason's virtuous heart to Zeus, she disguises herself as an old woman unable to cross on her own. Jason, feeling sympathy for the lady, ferries her across on his back but loses a sandal in its depths.
- In mythology, the Argonauts encounter Talos on their return journey after they had obtained the Golden Fleece. He is defeated not by Jason, but by Medea casting a spell, causing Talos to remove the bronze nail from his ankle which kept the ichor inside. Talos guarded Crete, not the "Isle of Bronze", and was protecting not a treasure, but Queen Europa.
- In the film, Hylas is killed when the crumbling remains of Talos crush him. However, in mythology, Hylas is actually kidnapped by a naiad who fell in love with him as he took a drink from a spring. Hercules stays behind on the island to look for him (as in the film).
- The harpies are not caught in a net or caged, but are chased away by the Boreads: Calaïs and Zetes (also Zethes)
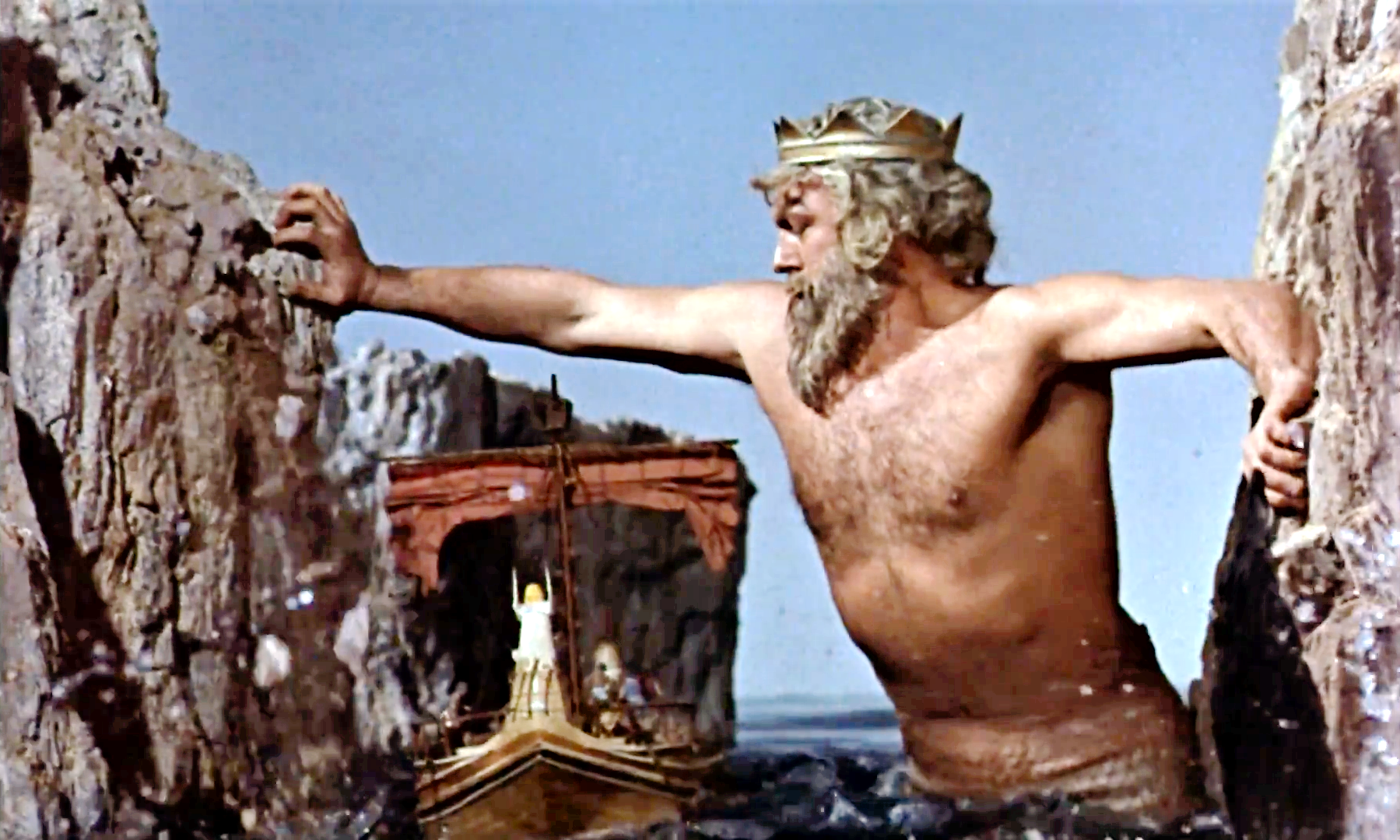
  The sea god Triton holds back the Clashing Rocks, allowing the Argo to pass through
- In the film, the god Triton saves the Argo from destruction passing through the Clashing Rocks: however; according to Apollonius of Rhodes, Phineus instructs Jason to release a dove and if the bird makes it through, row with all their might and the goddess Athena provides the extra push to the ship needed to clear them; "the Argo darted from the rocks like a flying arrow". Another source is Homer's Odyssey, in which Circe tells Odysseus: "One ship alone, one deep-sea craft sailed clear, the Argo, sung by the world, when heading home from Aeëtes shores. And she would have crashed against those giant rocks and sunk at once if Hera, for her love of Jason, had not sped her through."
- Jason is not betrayed by Acastus in the classical tale. Jason openly tells King Aeëtes that he has come for the Fleece. The king promises to let Jason take it if he performs three tasks, knowing full well they are impossible. However, Jason is able to complete the tasks with the help of Medea. It is not the Hydra that protected the Fleece, but rather a dragon. Jason does not slay it; instead, Medea casts a spell on it, causing it to fall asleep. Jason sows the dragon's teeth in the ground, not Aeëtes. He defeats the "dragon's offspring" (the spartoi) by making them fight amongst themselves and destroy each other, rather than battling them with his colleagues.
- The Children of the Hydra's Teeth are rotten corpses in the original legend, but because of the heavy censorship at the time the film was made, they were made skeletons instead.
- Castor and Phalerus are killed by the skeletons, but in Greek mythology Castor perishes much later as the result of a feud with Idas and Lynceus, while Phalerus survives the adventures of the Argonauts.
- The film ultimately omits the story of Medea killing and butchering her own brother, Absyrtus, to help Jason and the Argonauts escape; (Note: In an interview with John Landis, Landis said, "I noticed you left out Medea"; Ray responded "We had to.") and also the episodes with Cyzicus, the Gegeines and the Argonauts' stay on the isle of Lemnos.

== Reception ==
The film had its world premiere on June 13, 1963, at the Texas Theatre in San Antonio, Texas. It saw a same-day release Wichita Falls, Texas, Honolulu, Hawaii, and Fort Worth, Texas.

=== Critical response ===
The film received critical acclaim and is now considered a classic. On review aggregator Rotten Tomatoes, the film holds an approval rating of 85% based on 74 reviews, with an average rating of 7.6/10. The website's critical consensus reads, "A fantasy adventure with no pretensions, Jason and the Argonauts infuses a familiar myth with inventive Ray Harryhausen creature effects, dazzling camera work, and a rousing sense of adventure." On Metacritic, the film received a score of 69 based on 10 reviews.

Variety magazine wrote: "The $3 million film has a workable scenario and has been directed resourcefully and spiritedly by Don Chaffey, under whose leadership a colorful cast performs with zeal."

Ray Harryhausen regarded the film as his best. Previous Harryhausen films had been generally shown as part of double features in "B" theatres. Columbia was able to book it as a single feature in many "A" theatres in the United States.

=== Accolades ===
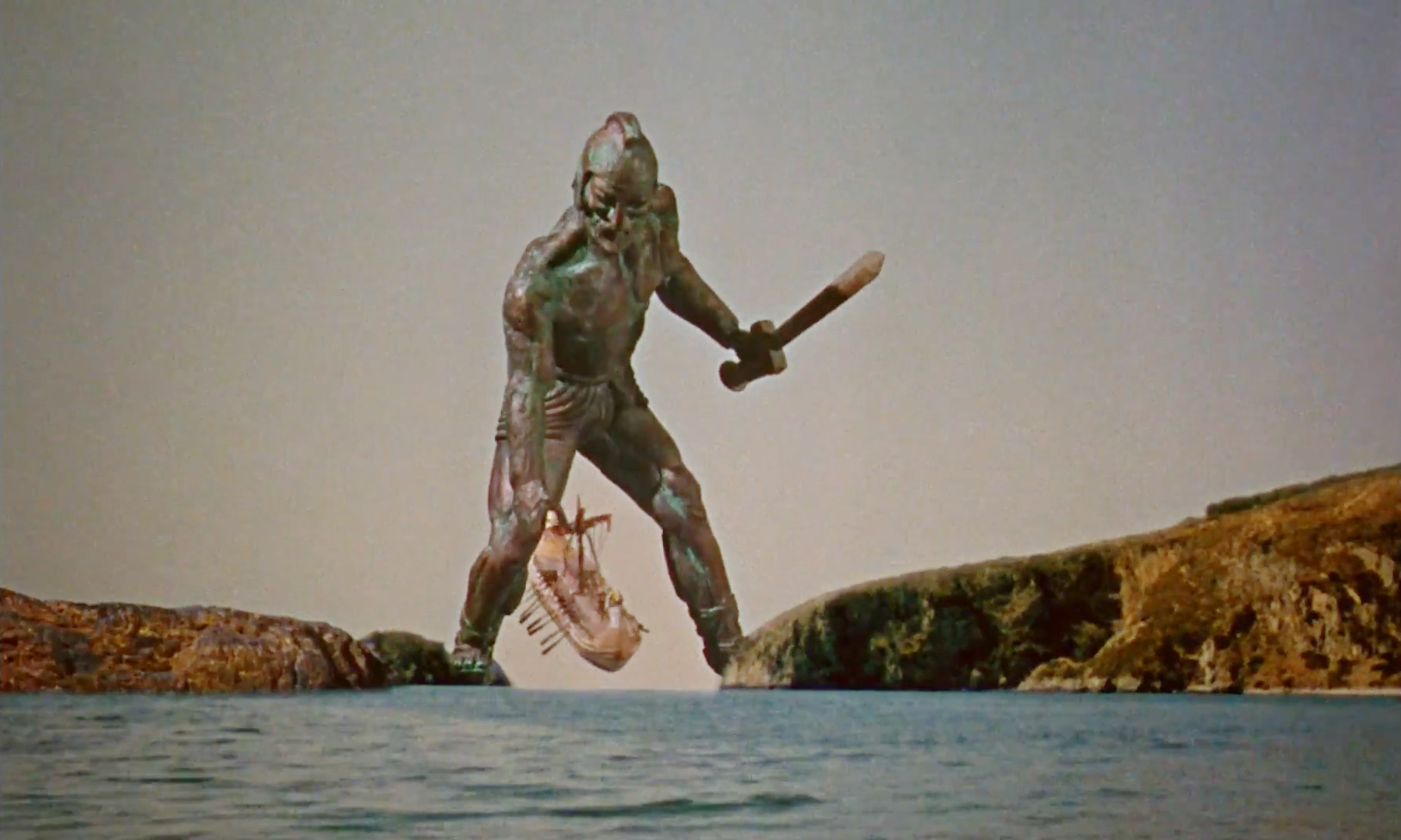
Talos, a giant bronze statue brought to life, seizes the Argo as the Argonauts try to flee the Isle of Bronze

At the special ceremony for the Academy Award for Technical Achievement held three weeks before the 1992 Academy Awards, Ray Harryhausen was honored with a lifetime-achievement award (the Gordon E. Sawyer Award). The ceremony's host, actor Tom Hanks, remarked: "Some people say Casablanca or Citizen Kane. I say Jason and the Argonauts is the greatest film ever made".

In 2008, the American Film Institute nominated the film for its Top 10 Fantasy Films list.

In April 2004, Empire magazine ranked Talos as the second-best film monster of all time, after King Kong.

In Great Britain, the film is recognized as an important children's film and is regularly shown on television during public holidays. The British Film Institute included Jason and the Argonauts in its 2020 updated list of "50 films to see by age 15", compiled with input from educators, authors, and critics.

The 2022 Oxford Handbook of Children's Film devoted an entire chapter to the motion picture entitled "Reading Jason and the Argonauts as a Children’s Film”. Film scholar Susan Smith sought to explain why "the film is able to speak so powerfully to childhood experience". She noted that, in addition to the film's widely praised Harryhausen special effects, there are elements of "contradictoriness and rebellion" in the story, with parallels in the relationship between the gods (depicted as gigantic in stature) to humans and between parents to children. In particular, the bronze giant Talos acts to punish the Argonauts after Hercules disobeys Hera's admonition to take only food and water on the Isle of Bronze and defiantly steals a huge golden pin stored in the treasury of the gods to use as a weapon. The act later results in the death of his close friend when Talos, drained of life, falls and crushes Hylas as he tries to retrieve the stolen pin dropped by Hercules.

== Home media ==
Columbia released the film on Blu-ray (for regions A, B, and C) on 6 July 2010. The disc's special features include two new audio commentaries, one by Peter Jackson and Randall William Cook, and the other by Harryhausen in conversation with his biographer Tony Dalton.

== Comic book adaptation ==
The five-issue comic book miniseries Jason and the Argonauts: The Kingdom of Hades (2007) from TidalWave Productions' Ray Harryhausen Signature Series, continued the story. It was followed by Jason and the Argonauts: Final Chorus (2014).

- Dell Movie Classic: Jason and the Argonauts (August–October 1963)

== See also ==
- Greek mythology in popular culture
- Jason and the Argonauts (2000 miniseries)
- List of films featuring Hercules
- List of stop-motion films
- Sword-and-sandal
