= Dick Crockett =

American actor and director

- Dick Crockett as Morgan from Batman
- Born: Richard DeHart Crockett; February 27, 1915; Maywood, Illinois, U.S.
- Died: January 25, 1979 (aged 63); Los Angeles, California, U.S.
- Occupations: Actor, stunt performer/coordinator
- Years active: 1939–1979

Richard DeHart Crockett (February 27, 1915 – January 25, 1979) was an American television and film actor, stunt performer, stunt coordinator, producer, and director, best known for his work with director Blake Edwards.

== Career ==
Crockett's first film was Room Service (1938) starring the Marx Brothers. The following year he began acting and doing stunt work in Bachelor Mother and The Hunchback of Notre Dame, respectively. He appeared in Munster, Go Home! and Batman, both released in 1966 and based on their respective television programs. Crockett continued working as an actor and a stuntman until the late 1970s.

Crockett was an associate producer for four films directed by Blake Edwards in the 1960s: The Pink Panther (1963), The Great Race (1965), What Did You Do in the War, Daddy? (1966) and Gunn (1967). A few years later, he became a second unit director for Edwards' Darling Lili (1970), and Wild Rovers (1971). In 1976, Crockett appeared in his final acting role as President Gerald Ford (whom he strongly resembled) in Edwards' The Pink Panther Strikes Again.

== Death ==
His last stunt work was as a stunt coordinator for 10 in 1979. The film was dedicated to him, as he died later that year of a heart attack in Los Angeles. According to Blake Edwards’ wife, Julie Andrews, in her memoir Home Work, Crockett died by suicide due to having been diagnosed with cancer. He left behind a suicide note to inform Edwards.

== Filmography ==
- Bachelor Mother (1939) - Undetermined Role (uncredited)
- Adventures of Captain Marvel (1941) - Bridge Heavy [Ch. 2] (uncredited)
- Music for Millions (1944) - Soldier (uncredited)
- This Man's Navy (1945) - Sparks
- Week-End at the Waldorf (1945) - Bell Captain (uncredited)
- A Letter for Evie (1946) - Soldier (uncredited)
- Blonde Alibi (1946) - Dr. Selby (uncredited)
- The Postman Always Rings Twice (1946) - Reporter (uncredited)
- The Dark Horse (1946) - Milkman (uncredited)
- Panhandle (1948) - Elliott Crockett
- The Luck of the Irish (1948) - Brawler at Wedding (uncredited)
- Wabash Avenue (1950) - Bartender
- The Milkman (1950) - Man (uncredited)
- Flying Disc Man from Mars (1950) - Cave Thug #2 [Ch. 5] (uncredited)
- Sealed Cargo (1951) - Nazi (uncredited)
- Government Agents vs Phantom Legion (1951) - Henchman Crane [Ch. 1] (uncredited)
- Gold Raiders (1951) - Henchman (uncredited)
- Week-End with Father (1951) - Father in Canoe Race (uncredited)
- Sound Off (1952) - Boatman on Lake (uncredited)
- The Steel Trap (1952) - Cab Driver (uncredited)
- Jalopy (1953) - Jalopy Driver (uncredited)
- All Ashore (1953) - Charlie - Security Guard
- Split Second (1953) - Air Force Helicopter Pilot (uncredited)
- Cruisin' Down the River (1953) - Sheriff (uncredited)
- Topeka (1953) - Will Peters
- China Venture (1953) - Chief Waggner (uncredited)
- Drive a Crooked Road (1954) - Don
- Pushover (1954) - Mr. Crockett (uncredited)
- Dragnet (1954) - Balding Card Player (uncredited)
- Naked Alibi (1954) - Waiter (uncredited)
- Bring Your Smile Along (1955) - Drummer in Orchestra Pit (uncredited)
- Creature with the Atom Brain (1955) - Creature Who Calls Camden (uncredited)
- Over-Exposed (1956) - Jerry
- Santiago (1956) - Curly (uncredited)
- A Cry in the Night (1956) - Police Officer McEvoy (uncredited)
- Full of Life (1956) - Train Conductor (uncredited)
- Mister Cory (1957) - The cook
- The Garment Jungle (1957) - Miller (uncredited)
- Operation Mad Ball (1957) - Sgt. McCloskey (uncredited)
- Escape from Red Rock (1957) - Krug henchman
- Baby Face Nelson (1957) - Powell (uncredited)
- Live Fast, Die Young (1958) - Little Guy
- The Lineup (1958) - Truck Driver (uncredited)
- No Time for Sergeants (1958) - Soldier in Bar Brawl (uncredited)
- The Case Against Brooklyn (1958) - Thug (uncredited)
- Street of Darkness (1958) - Coke
- The Perfect Furlough (1958) - Hans, MP #2
- Bell Book and Candle (1958) - Ad-lib Bit (uncredited)
- It Happened to Jane (1959) - Clarence Runyon
- Operation Petticoat (1959) - Harmon
- Strangers When We Meet (1960) - Charlie (uncredited)
- High Time (1960) - Bones McKinney (uncredited)
- Spartacus (1960) - Guard (uncredited)
- Breakfast at Tiffany's (1961) - Cab Driver (uncredited)
- Experiment in Terror (1962) - FBI Agent #1
- The Notorious Landlady (1962) - Detective Carstairs (uncredited)
- Days of Wine and Roses (1962) - Boor (uncredited)
- Twilight of Honor (1963) - Bartender (uncredited)
- Munster, Go Home! (1966) - Ship Steward (uncredited)
- Batman (1966) - Morgan
- Star Trek (1966-1968) - various characters (3 episodes; uncredited)
- Gunn (1967) - Leo Gracey
- The Party (1968) - Wells
- The Moonshine War (1970) - Carl
- Wild Rovers (1971) - Sheriff's Deputy
- Diamonds Are Forever (1971) - Crane Operator (uncredited)
- The Carey Treatment (1972) - Callahan, Turkish Bath Proprietor (uncredited)
- The Getaway (1972) - Bank Guard
- Across 110th Street (1972) - Patrolman
- The Don Is Dead (1973) - Cab Driver (uncredited)
- Blazing Saddles (1974) - Townsman #2 (uncredited)
- The Pink Panther Strikes Again (1976) - President Gerald Ford (final film role)
- Star Trek: Deep Space Nine (1996) - Unnamed Klingon (archive footage in episode Trials and Tribble-ations; uncredited)
