= Bring Your Smile Along =

1955 film by Blake Edwards

- Film poster
- Directed by: Blake Edwards
- Written by: Blake Edwards; Richard Quine
- Produced by: Jonie Taps
- Starring: Frankie Laine; Keefe Brasselle; Constance Towers; Lucy Marlow; William Leslie
- Cinematography: Charles Lawton Jr.
- Edited by: Al Clark
- Music by: Paul Mason Howard
- Distributed by: Columbia Pictures
- Release date: June 22, 1955
- Running time: 83 minutes
- Country: United States
- Language: English

Bring Your Smile Along is a 1955 American Technicolor comedy film by Blake Edwards. It was Edwards' directorial debut and the motion picture debut of Constance Towers. Edwards wrote the script for this Frankie Laine musical with his mentor, director Richard Quine. Songs Laine sang in the film included his 1951 hit "The Gandy Dancers' Ball."

== Plot ==
New England schoolteacher Nancy Willows leaves her school and fiancé David Parker to go to New York City for a career as a lyricist. Her neighbors across the hall are an easy going singer named Jerry Dennis and his hotheaded songwriter roommate Marty Adams who is incapable of writing acceptable lyrics for his songs.

== Cast ==
- Frankie Laine as Jerry Dennis
- Keefe Brasselle as Martin "Marty" Adams
- Constance Towers as Nancy Willows
- Lucy Marlow as Marge Stevenson
- William Leslie as David Parker
- Mario Siletti as Ricardo
- Ruth Warren as Mrs. Klein
- Jack Albertson as Mr. Jenson
- Bobby Clark as Waldo
- Murray Leonard as Dave
- Ida Smeraldo as Mama

== Edwards and Quine's partnership ==
Richard Quine and Blake Edwards would subsequently write He Laughed Last for Frankie Laine. Edwards had previously written several scripts for Quine to direct: Sound Off was a 1952 service comedy starring Mickey Rooney; Rainbow 'Round My Shoulder was an earlier Laine vehicle from the same team; and All Ashore was Quine and Edwards' variation on On the Town teaming Rooney and Dick Haymes. Haymes also starred in their Cruisin' Down the River. Edwards directed second unit on Quine's Drive a Crooked Road, which cast Rooney against type and featured Quine and Edwards' script. Edwards continued working with Quine after launching his own directing career. Their latter day efforts included the early Jack Lemmon films: My Sister Eileen, Operation Mad Ball, and The Notorious Landlady. Quine and Edwards also created the short-lived sitcom The Mickey Rooney Show, and developed Rooney's 1954 spoof, The Atomic Kid, for Republic Pictures.

== See also ==
- List of American films of 1955
