= Esther Minciotti =

Italian actress (1888–1962)

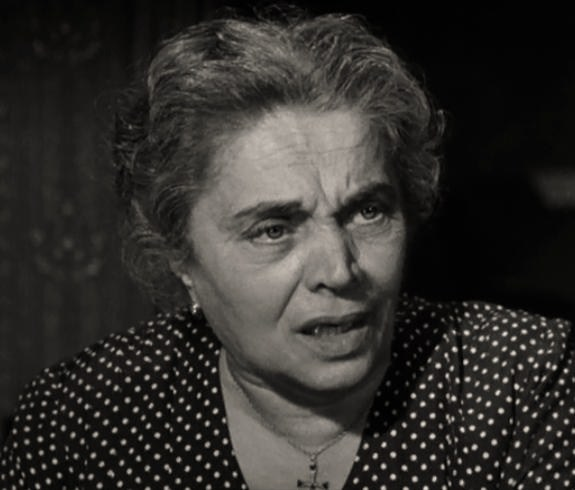
- in Marty (1955)
- Born: May 20, 1888; Turin, Italy
- Died: April 15, 1962 (aged 73); New York City, U.S.
- Occupation: Actress
- Years active: 1949–1958
- Notable work: House of Strangers (1949); Marty (1955); The Wrong Man (1956)
- Spouse: Silvio Minciotti (31st Aug 1882 - 2nd May 1961) (his death) (3 children)

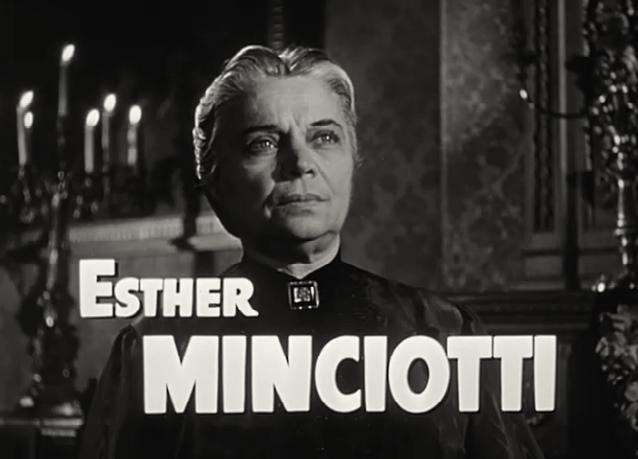
In House of Strangers (1949)

Esther Cunico Minciotti (born May 20, 1888, in Turin, Italy – died April 15, 1962, in New York, United States) was an Italian actress.

== Biography ==
Esther Cunico and her husband – Silvio Minciotti (1882–1961), also an actor of Italian origin – emigrated to the United States and settled in New York. There, she played on Broadway in two plays, the first from November 1949 to January 1950, the second (alongside her husband) in October 1956 (see the "Theatre" section below).

In the cinema, she collaborated in only eight American films (see the complete filmography which follows), between 1949 and 1956. Her best known role is undoubtedly that of Theresa Piletti, Ernest Borgnine's mother, in Marty (1955) by Delbert Mann. The following year (1956), she is this time the mother of Henry Fonda, in The Wrong Man directed by Alfred Hitchcock. Note that her husband Silvio Minciotti appears in five of these films (including four minor uncredited roles, including that of Marty's boss).

On television, Esther Minciotti participated in five series in the 1950s. In particular, she created the role of Theresa Piletti, with Rod Steiger playing Marty, in an episode (same title; also directed by Delbert Mann) of The Philco Television Playhouse broadcast in 1953, on an original screenplay by Paddy Chayefsky, 2 years before the film adaptation.

== Filmography ==
=== Film ===
- 1949: Shockproof (by Douglas Sirk) - Mrs. Marat
- 1949: The Undercover Man (by Joseph H. Lewis) - Maria Rocco
- 1949: House of Strangers (by Joseph L. Mankiewicz) - Theresa Monetti
- 1951: Strictly Dishonorable (by Melvin Frank and Norman Panama) - Mme. Maria Caraffa
- 1955: Marty (by Delbert Mann) - Mrs. Teresa Piletti
- 1955: Murder in Villa Capri (by Otto Simetti) - Mama Flumeri
- 1956: The Wrong Man (by Alfred Hitchcock) - Mama Balestrero
- 1956: Full of Life (by Richard Quine) - Mama Colletta Rocco

=== Television ===
- 1950: Studio One (Season 2, episode: "The Man who had Influence", by Franklin J. Schaffner) - Mrs. Cassini
- 1951: Armstrong Circle Theatre (Season 1, episode: "Johnny Pickup", by Ted Post) - Mme. Maria Caraffa
- 1953: The Philco Television Playhouse, Season 5, episode: "Marty", by Delbert Mann) - Mrs. Pilletti - Mother
- 1957: Playhouse 90 (Season 2, episode: "The Death of Manolete", by John Frankenheimer) - Augustias
- 1958: Westinghouse Desilu Playhouse (Season 1, episode: "My Father, the Fool", by Jerry Thorpe) - Mama (final appearance)

=== Theatre ===
Plays performed on Broadway

- 1949–1950: That Lady by Kate O'Brien, produced by Katharine Cornell, with Henry Daniell, Henry Stephenson, Torin Thatcher, Joseph Wiseman, Katharine Cornell
- 1956: The Best House in Naples Eduardo De Filippo, adapted by F. Hugh Herbert, music by George Bassman, with Katy Jurado, Silvio Minciotti
