= Queen Bee (1955 film) =

1955 Gothic melodrama film

- Theatrical release poster
- Directed by: Ranald MacDougall
- Screenplay by: Ranald MacDougall
- Based on: The Queen Bee by Edna L. Lee
- Produced by: Jerry Wald
- Starring: Joan Crawford; Barry Sullivan; Betsy Palmer; John Ireland; Lucy Marlow
- Cinematography: Charles Lang
- Edited by: Viola Lawrence
- Music by: George Duning
- Color process: Black and white
- Production company: Columbia Pictures
- Distributed by: Columbia Pictures
- Release date: October 18, 1955 (Philadelphia)
- Running time: 95 minutes
- Country: United States
- Language: English

Queen Bee is a 1955 American drama film starring Joan Crawford, Barry Sullivan, Betsy Palmer, John Ireland, and Lucy Marlow. The film was directed by Ranald MacDougall and produced by Jerry Wald. The screenplay by MacDougall was based upon the 1949 novel The Queen Bee by Edna L. Lee.

The film tells the story about a Southern family dominated by a ruthless woman and the havoc her threats and intimidation cause to those around her.

== Plot ==
Eva Phillips dominates her Georgia mansion and her facially scarred husband Avery, nicknamed "Beauty", an alcoholic mill owner who hates her. A cousin, Jennifer Stewart, stays with the family and watches in horror as Eva maneuvers to prevent the marriage of Avery's sister Carol to Avery's business manager Judson Prentiss, Eva's former lover. Jennifer learns that Eva stole Avery from house guest Sue McKinnon, who has been mentally disturbed ever since.

Jennifer briefly dates Sue's suave brother Ty. As tension builds among the residents of the mansion, Avery shoots Eva's terminally ill dog off-screen, telling people to lie to Eva and say that the dog had died naturally. Jennifer says that she does not like to lie, and Avery says that Eva favors lies over truth.

Carol warns Jennifer about Eva, whom she compares to a queen bee that kills her competitors. Jennifer refuses to believe Carol and becomes Eva's assistant, as well as a caretaker for Tessa and Ted, the young Phillips children. Ted experiences intense nightmares about a fatal car crash involving his parents.

Eva tries to seduce Jud in a dark room, but he refuses her advances. Jennifer observes from the staircase and is shocked. Eva warns Jud that he will be sorry for refusing her. When Carol and Jud's engagement is announced, Eva strongly hints at her past affair with Jud, and Carol hangs herself in the horse stable.

Avery catches nanny Miss Breen acting abusively toward the children and fires her. Jennifer and Avery share a furtive kiss when he tells her that he is aware of Eva and Jud's past. Eva senses the developing relationship and her malevolence deepens. She insists that Miss Breen remain and cautions Avery to not interact with Jennifer any further. When he refuses, she threatens a scandalous divorce in the press.

Jud, still guilty over Carol's death, leaves the house for several weeks, but comes back one day for work. He learns from Jennifer that it was really Eva who had informed Carol about his earlier relationship with Eva, not Avery as he had assumed. Avery, after glancing over his gun cabinet, completely changes his treatment of Eva, acting as if he is deeply in love with her, even giving her an expensive bracelet. She changes her attitude and says that she will no longer be manipulative because her husband finally loves her. However, Jud sees through the charade and confronts Avery, correctly surmising that Avery's true motive for his new attitude toward Eva is a ploy to engender her trust in him so that he can kill her.

Jud preempts Avery's plan on the night when Avery intends to commit murder-suicide and drives Eva to the fancy-dress party to which Avery would have driven her. While driving on a rain-slick road, Jud explains to Eva what Avery's plan had been, though Eva comes to believe that it is actually Jud who wants her dead, so she frantically attacks him, which results in a crash over a cliff, killing them both. Before learning of his mother's death, Ted has another dream about a fatal car crash. Now, Jennifer and Avery are free to love each other.

== Cast ==
- Joan Crawford as Eva Phillips
- Barry Sullivan as Avery Philips
- Betsy Palmer as Carol Lee Phillips
- John Ireland as Jud Prentiss
- Lucy Marlow as Jennifer Stewart
- William Leslie as Ty McKinnon
- Fay Wray as Sue McKinnon
- Katherine Anderson as Miss Breen
- Tim Hovey as Ted Phillips
- Linda Bennett as Tessa Phillips
- Bill Walker as Sam

== Production ==
Joan Crawford's contract for Queen Bee awarded her a percentage of the film's profits.

== Release ==
Queen Bee opened in Philadelphia on October 18, 1955. To promote the film, Joan Crawford embarked on a six-city personal-appearance tour.

== Reception ==
In a contemporary review for The New York Times, critic Bosley Crowther wrote:

When she is killed at the end, as she should be, it is a genuine pleasure and relief. The one blatant trouble with this picture, for which Ronald [sic] MacDougall is to blame, since he was the writer and director, is that the killing is too long postponed. Five minutes after Miss Crawford appears on the luxurious scene, acting the queen bee like a buzz saw and oozing her unctuous poison from every cell, it is evident—no, it is mandatory—that she should be taken out and shot or run off a cliff in an automobile, which is how it is finally done. ... As a matter of fact, Mr. MacDougall takes so long in getting this picture to the point that even a patient observer might entertain some lethal thoughts toward him. ... When the deed is finally done by Mr. Ireland, nothing has really been achieved except a mawkish manifestation of cheap dramatics. We've enough of those all over the world these days.

Critic Philip K. Scheuer of the Los Angeles Times wrote: "Queen Bee is the first directorial effort of usually able screenwriter Ranald MacDougall, but his abilities in both capacities are largely wasted here. For this is as draggy and dreary a collection of photographed monologues as has come along in quite a blessed while, and I see little justification for it. Not even Miss Crawford, wardrobe, emoting and all. ... The toll at close is two suicides, one homicide and an audience that has been talked to death."

== Awards ==
Queen Bee was nominated in two categories at the 28th Academy Awards in 1956: Best Cinematography (Charles Lang) and Best Costume Design, Black-and-White (Jean Louis).

== Home media ==
Queen Bee was distributed in VHS format in the early 1990s. It was released on Region 1 DVD by Sony Pictures Home Entertainment in 2001 and as part of the TCM four-disc DVD set Joan Crawford in the 1950s set in November 2012. On November 8, 2013, it was released on DVD as part of Sony Pictures' "Choice Collection" online program.

== See also ==
- List of American films of 1955
