= Street of Darkness =

1958 film

- Directed by: Robert G. Walker
- Written by: Maurice Tombragel; Malvin Wald
- Produced by: Robert Keys; Nathan Barragar; Joseph H. Plunkett
- Starring: Robert Keys
- Edited by: Robert J. Oswlad; J.R. Whittredge
- Music by: Frank Worth
- Distributed by: Robert Keys Productions
- Release date: June 11, 1958
- Running time: 60 min
- Country: United States
- Language: English

Street of Darkness is a 1958 American adventure drama directed by Robert G. Walker and starring Robert Keys. It premiered on June 11, 1958.

== Plot ==
Former colleagues Brett, Matt and Jesse reunite in New Orleans and embark on a search for treasure.

== Cast ==
- Robert Keys as Brett Marshall
- John Close as Matt Flood
- James Seay as Jesse Flores
- Julie Gibson as Danielle Dubois
- Sheila Ryan as Carmen Flores
- Henry Rowland as inspector
- Dub Taylor as Duffy Tyler
- Dick Crockett as Coke
- Ed Nelson as Slavo
- Val Winter as Miles Barton
- Walter Hamlin as Owen
- Steve Raines as Flakey
