= Bobby Clark (juvenile actor) =

American former child actor (1944–2021)

- Publicity Photo of Bobby Clark
- Born: Robert Dwain Clark; November 13, 1944; Seattle, Washington, U.S.
- Died: November 14, 2021 (aged 77); Humboldt County, California, U.S.
- Occupation: Actor
- Years active: 1951–1964
- Spouse: Vikki Young (m. 1997; died 2021)

Robert Dwain Clark (November 13, 1944 – November 14, 2021) was an American child actor.

== Career ==
Clark appeared in the movies Invasion of the Body Snatchers, Ransom!, Gun Duel in Durango, Rebel in Town, The Happy Road, Bring Your Smile Along, and The Ten Commandments.

He was a regular in the syndicated 1957–1958 television series, Casey Jones, playing Casey Junior. The series starred Alan Hale Jr. in the title role.

Clark made a guest appearance on Perry Mason as the title character in the 1958 episode, "The Case of the Pint-Sized Client". He also appeared in episodes of Alfred Hitchcock Presents, The Loretta Young Show, The Americans (a drama of the American Civil War), Lassie, General Electric Theater, Ford Theatre, Gunsmoke, Studio 57, The Pepsi-Cola Playhouse, Screen Directors Playhouse, Climax!, Front Row Center, Dick Powell's Zane Grey Theatre, Northwest Passage, Crossroads, and Bachelor Father. After his career in front of the camera, he worked as a stage actor in Southern California and later in Ferndale, California.

Clark's wife, Vikki, died on January 6, 2021, with his father following on April 15. Clark's own health began to decline, and he died in Humboldt County, California, on November 14, 2021, a day after his 77th birthday

== Filmography ==
Year	Title	Role	Notes
1951	Kentucky Jubilee	Vaudeville Performer	
1955	Alfred Hitchcock Presents	10th Avenue Kid	Season 1 Episode 12: "Santa Claus and the 10th Avenue Kid"
1955	Screen Directors Playhouse	Sonny Waters	Season 1 Episode 1: "Meet The Governor"
1955	Bring Your Smile Along	Waldo	
1956	Ransom!	Andy Stannard	
1956	Invasion of the Body Snatchers	Jimmy Grimaldi	
1956	The Ten Commandments	Little Boy in Exodus	
1957	Alfred Hitchcock Presents	Bobby	Season 2 Episode 35: "The West Warlock Time Capsule"
1957	The Happy Road	Danny Andrews	
1957	Gun Duel in Durango	Robbie	
1957	Destination 60,000	Skip Buckley	
1957	Tales of Wells Fargo	Dan Simmons	
1957	General Electric Theater	Joey Hogan	
1957	Code 3	Bobby	
1957–1958	Casey Jones	Casey Jones Jr.	
1958	The Danny Thomas Show	Shoeshine Boy	
1958	Perry Mason	Nicky Renzi	
1958	Northwest Passage	Jean Louis	
1959	Wanted: Dead or Alive	Shoeshine Boy	
1959	Lassie	Frankie Jessup	
1961	The Donna Reed Show	Gordie	
1962	The New Breed	Tommy	
1964	My Three Sons	Eddie	Final role
1968	The Virginian (TV series)	Lookout	Season 6 Episode 20: "The Good-hearted Badman"
