= The Twinkle in God's Eye =

1955 film by George Blair

- Theatrical release poster
- Directed by: George Blair
- Written by: P.J. Wolfson
- Produced by: Mickey Rooney
- Starring: Mickey Rooney; Coleen Gray; Hugh O'Brian; Joey Forman; Don "Red" Barry; Mike Connors
- Cinematography: Bud Thackery
- Edited by: Tony Martinelli
- Music by: Van Alexander
- Production company: Mickey Rooney Productions
- Distributed by: Republic Pictures
- Release date: October 13, 1955
- Running time: 73 minutes
- Country: United States
- Language: English

The Twinkle in God's Eye is a 1955 American Western film directed by George Blair and written by P.J. Wolfson. The film stars Mickey Rooney, Coleen Gray, Hugh O'Brian, Joey Forman, Don "Red" Barry and Mike Connors. The film was released on October 13, 1955, by Republic Pictures.

== Plot ==
A newly ordained minister, Rev. Macklin, catches a ride to the town of Lodestone in a stagecoach carrying six dancehall girls. They are on their way to work for saloon owner Marty Callahan, including one, Laura, who once loved Callahan but no longer does.

Macklin explains that his father once built a church in this town, but it burned to the ground. He now wants to rebuild it, but Callahan is opposed and persuades others not to help the preacher in any way. Only the saloon girls attend his first service.

A gang of outlaws led by one called Lou robs the saloon and hides the loot in the church. Lou and his men pretend to be religious converts until an opportunity can arise to retrieve their money. Macklin, trying to raise money, enters a rodeo and wins a $300 prize, but Laura also competes, is thrown from a bronco and ends up in a wheelchair.

Macklin befriends a band of Indians, who assist in his endeavors. Lou sincerely does become a convert and even Callahan has a change of heart when Macklin returns the stolen money. Laura, seeing a new side of Callahan, agrees to marry him, so Macklin conducts their wedding.

== Cast ==
- Mickey Rooney as Rev. William Macklin II
- Coleen Gray as Laura
- Hugh O'Brian as Marty Callahan
- Joey Forman as Ted
- Don "Red" Barry as Dawson
- Mike Connors as Lou
- Jil Jarmyn as Millie
- Kem Dibbs as Johnny
- Tony Garcen as Babe
- Raymond Hatton as Stable man
- Ruta Lee as Ruthie
