= Ann Robinson =

American actress and stunt horse rider (1929–2025)

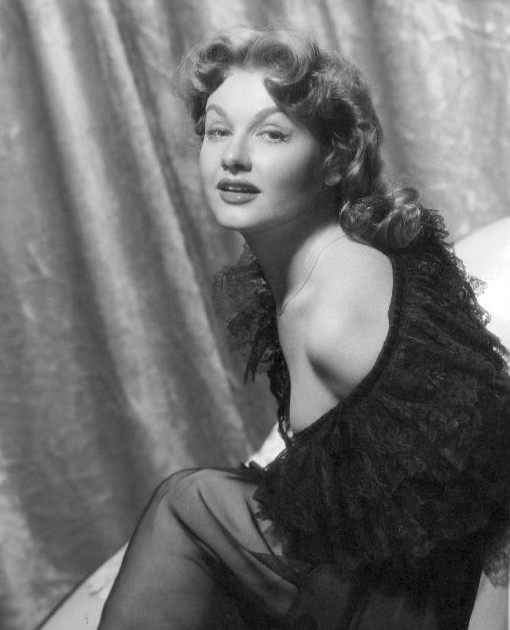
- Robinson in 1955
- Born: May 25, 1929; Los Angeles, California, U.S.
- Died: September 26, 2025 (aged 96); Los Angeles, California, U.S.
- Occupation: Actress
- Years active: 1949–2005; 2018–2020
- Spouses: Jaime Bravo (m. 1957; div. 1967); Joseph Valdez (m. 1987; div. 2017)
- Children: 2

Ann Robinson (May 25, 1929 – September 26, 2025) was an American actress and stunt horse rider. She had a leading role in the science-fiction classic The War of the Worlds, and starred in the 1954 film Dragnet as a Los Angeles police officer.

== Early life ==
Robinson was born on May 25, 1929, and attended Hollywood High School. Her father was employed by the Bank of Hollywood, at the corner of Hollywood and Vine. He taught her how to ride horses, beginning when she was only three. Robinson became an accomplished rider, which led to her first professional work in Hollywood as a stunt rider in film Frenchie with Shelley Winters.

== Acting career ==
After doubling for Winters in Frenchie, Robinson starred and rode in several Westerns during her career, including The Cimarron Kid (1951) with Audie Murphy, Gun Brothers (1956), and Gun Duel in Durango (1957).

Paramount Pictures signed Robinson as an actress in the early 1950s. Her first leading role was as Sylvia Van Buren in The War of the Worlds (1953) co-starring with Gene Barry, a role she somewhat reprised in two later films, first as Dr. Van Buren in Midnight Movie Massacre (1988) and then as Dr. Sylvia Van Buren in The Naked Monster (2005). She also reprised the role in three episodes of the television series War of the Worlds (1988).

Robinson worked on several other films, including Imitation of Life (1959) and the Doris Day thriller Julie (1956). She also had a starring role opposite Jack Webb and Ben Alexander in Dragnet (1954), a feature-film version of the hit television series. From 1955 to 1959, Robinson was cast in 10 episodes of the NBC children's Western television series Fury as Helen Watkins, the teacher of series character Joey Clark Newton (Bobby Diamond) and romantic interest of his adopted father, Jim Newton (Peter Graves).

Robinson's other television roles were on Adam-12, Alfred Hitchcock Presents, Bachelor Father, Ben Casey, Biff Baker, U.S.A., The Bob Cummings Show, The George Burns and Gracie Allen Show, Days of Our Lives, Four Star Playhouse, General Hospital, Gilligan's Island, It's a Great Life, The Millionaire, My Little Margie, Perry Mason, Peter Gunn, Police Woman, Rawhide, Rocky Jones Space Ranger, Rory Calhoun's The Texan, Waterfront, and The Life and Legend of Wyatt Earp. In 1955, she appeared as Joan Carter on the TV Western Cheyenne in the premiere episode titled "Mountain Fortress".

She was featured in several commercials for Home Savings of America, Toni home perms, and Chesterfield Cigarettes. She performed a number of film voice-overs, also, in English and Spanish. She did the leading actress' voice in To Begin Again, which won the 1984 Oscar for best foreign film. She also did loops for the Bruce Lee series The Dead Are Alive, Tough Guys, and Survive.

In 1985, Robinson appeared in a documentary about George Pal titled The Fantasy Film Worlds of George Pal (produced and directed by Arnold Leibovit). In 1988, Ann Robinson reprised her role as Sylvia van Buren from the original The War of the Worlds film for the War of the Worlds television series. In the 2005 Steven Spielberg film, War of the Worlds, she played a cameo role as Tom Cruise's character's mother-in-law, the grandmother of Dakota Fanning's character, alongside her long-ago co-star Gene Barry.

== Personal life and death ==
In 1957, Robinson eloped to Mexico to marry matador Jaime Bravo, with whom she had two sons – Jaime A. Bravo, Jr. (TV director for ABC Sports and ESPN) and Estefan A. Bravo (actor, seen in White Trash Wins Lotto, a musical by Andy Prieboy). While residing in Mexico, Robinson played minor Hollywood roles, mainly in science-fiction films. The couple divorced in 1967. On February 2, 1970, Bravo was killed in an automobile accident on the way to a bullfight. In 1987, Robinson married real estate broker and business manager Joseph Valdez in California, where they took up residence in the Echo Park area of Los Angeles.

Robinson died at her home in Los Angeles, on September 26, 2025, at the age of 96. Her death was not announced publicly until May 2026.

== Selected filmography ==
- The War of the Worlds (1953)
- Cheyenne (1955) (season 1, episode 1: "Mountain Fortress") as Joan Carter
- Gun Duel in Durango (1957)
- Imitation of Life (1959)
- Rawhide (1960) (season 3, episode 2: "Incident of the Challenge") as Julia Garcia
- Alfred Hitchcock Presents (1961) (season 6, episode 38: "Ambition") as Helen Cox
- War of the Worlds (2005)
