= The Night the World Exploded =

1957 film by Fred F. Sears

- Theatrical release poster
- Directed by: Fred F. Sears
- Written by: Jack Natteford; Luci Ward
- Produced by: Sam Katzman
- Starring: Kathryn Grant; William Leslie
- Narrated by: Gerald Mohr
- Cinematography: Benjamin H. Kline; Irving Lippman
- Edited by: Paul Borofsky; Al Clark
- Music by: Ross DiMaggio
- Color process: Black and white
- Production company: Clover Productions
- Distributed by: Columbia Pictures
- Release date: June 1957
- Running time: 64 minutes
- Country: United States
- Language: English

The Night the World Exploded is a 1957 American science fiction disaster film directed by Fred F. Sears. The film was written by Jack Natteford and Luci Ward and produced by Sam Katzman. Both Katzman and Sears were known for their B movie films. The film was released in June 1957 by Columbia Pictures on a double bill with The Giant Claw (1957) .

== Plot ==
The scientific team of Dr. David Conway (William Leslie), Dr. Ellis Morton (Tristram Coffin), and Laura Hutchinson (Kathryn Grant) has built a machine that can predict earthquakes. After predicting one will hit California within the next 24 hours to a uniformly skeptical Gov. Cheney (Raymond Greenleaf) and state-level political and civil defense officials, the earthquake does materialize and does immense damage to northern parts of the state. Now with the support and funding necessary from the reformed skeptics, the team works on further predictions and comes to the conclusion that a wave of earthquakes is pending in and around the southwestern United States. They trace the epicenter of the pending disaster to an area beneath the Carlsbad Caverns and descend to a hitherto unexplored level.

Here they find a strange ore which, when removed from contact with water, becomes highly explosive, and realize that this element, somehow working its way from deep in the Earth, is responsible for the earthquakes. Although the material is not analyzed for specific atomic traits, it is named Element 112 just because so far, 111 chemical elements had been discovered. A computer determines that in approximately one month, enough of Element 112 will emerge from the deep earth to cause the entire planet to explode. A desperate operation ensues worldwide to blast and trench the ground to let water in and cover Element 112, keeping it from drying out and expanding.

== Cast ==
- Kathryn Grant as Laura Hutchinson
- William Leslie as Dr. David Conway
- Tristram Coffin as Dr. Ellis Morton (as Tris Coffin)
- Raymond Greenleaf as Gov. Chaney
- Charles Evans as General Bortes
- Frank J. Scannell as Sheriff Quinn (as Frank Scannell)
- Marshall Reed as the General's Aide
- Fred Coby as Ranger Brown
- Paul Savage as Ranger Gold
- Terry Frost as Chief Rescue Worker
- Lyle Latell as Civil Defense Chief Carson

== Production ==
The Night the World Exploded went into production with shooting locations at the Carlsbad Caverns in New Mexico; the Iverson Movie Ranch in Chatsworth, California; and the ElectroData (Burroughs) Corporation Building in Pasadena, California. Principal photography took place from November 8–20, 1956.

== Reception ==
Columbia Pictures released The Night the World Exploded theatrically as a double bill with The Giant Claw (1957) in June 1957. Critical reception was not positive, with Hal Erickson of The New York Times later commenting, "Despite all the scientific doublespeak, 'The Night the World Exploded' is doggedly non-intellectual in its execution and appeal."

Film critic Leonard Maltin noted that the film disappointed: "Scientists discover a strange, exploding mineral that threatens to bring about title catastrophe and rush to prevent it. OK idea hampered by low budget."

== See also ==
- List of American films of 1957
