= Gun Duel in Durango =

1957 film by Sidney Salkow

- Directed by: Sidney Salkow
- Written by: Louis Stevens
- Produced by: Robert E. Kent
- Starring: George Montgomery; Ann Robinson; Steve Brodie
- Cinematography: Maury Gertsman
- Edited by: Robert Golden
- Music by: Paul Sawtell; Bert Shefter
- Color process: Black and white
- Production companies: Peerless Productions; Robert E. Kent Productions
- Distributed by: United Artists
- Release date: May 1, 1957
- Running time: 74 minutes
- Country: United States
- Language: English

Gun Duel in Durango is a 1957 American Western film directed by Sidney Salkow and starring George Montgomery.

It was originally known as The Last Gun in Durango.

== Plot ==
Will Sabre, an outlaw, decides to reform and ride to a new territory to begin a new life. This angers the gang's leader, Jake Dunsten, who gives chase.

Will encounters a 10-year-old boy burying his father, killed in a covered-wagon attack. Dunsten's men ride up and shoot it out with Will, who uses the man's grave for cover.

Taking the boy, Robbie, with him to the town of Durango, an attempt is made by Will to start fresh. He calls himself Dan Tomlinson and finds a job in a bank. He renews an acquaintance with a former sweetheart, rancher Judy Ollivant, who believes his story that he is no longer an outlaw. Sheriff Howard is suspicious of the stranger, however, and sends a wire seeking information about the notorious Will Sabre, even though a Texas Rangers captain vouches for "Dan."

Dunsten's gang kidnap Robbie and hold him hostage, forcing Will to help them rob the bank. Will goes through with it, but personally captures Dunsten and returns the stolen loot, earning a pardon from the governor that enables him to settle down with Judy and Robbie for good.

== Cast ==
- George Montgomery as Dan
- Ann Robinson as Judy
- Steve Brodie as Dunsten
- Bobby Clark as Robbie
- Frank Ferguson as Sheriff Howard
- Don "Red" Barry as Larry (as Donald Barry)
- Henry Rowland as Roy
- Denver Pyle as Ranger Captain
- Mary Treen as Spinster
- Al Wyatt Sr. as Jones (as Al Wyatt)
- Boyd "Red" Morgan as Burt (as Red Morgan)
- Joe Yrigoyen as Stacey

== See also ==
- List of American films of 1957
