= Joey Forman =

American actor (1929–1982)

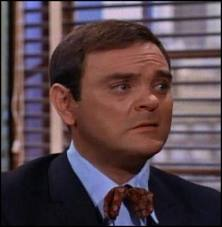
- Joey Forman in The Monkees
- Born: November 18, 1929; Philadelphia, Pennsylvania, U.S.
- Died: December 9, 1982 (aged 53); Los Angeles, California, U.S.
- Occupations: Actor; comedian
- Years active: 1954–1982

Joseph Forman (November 18, 1929 – December 9, 1982) was an American comedian and comic actor.

== Biography ==
Born in Philadelphia, Pennsylvania, Forman appeared on the late 1940s local radio show the Magic Lady Supper Club along with his school friend, singer Eddie Fisher. The pair travelled to upstate New York to the Grossinger's Catskill Resort Hotel in the Catskill Mountains. Forman was originally an athletic director, but his funny remarks led the management to place him on the stage as a comedian, though Forman wished to become a serious actor. Forman broke into show business after winning an Arthur Godfrey's Talent Scouts program.

He first attracted attention in Las Vegas as the opening act for Mickey Rooney and also Rooney's straight man. He also co-starred in Mickey Rooney's 1954–1955 NBC sitcom The Mickey Rooney Show, as Mickey's best friend, Freddy, and appeared with him in the films Andy Hardy Comes Home (1958) and The Big Operator (1959). He guest-starred in an unaired 1963 episode of the situation comedy Don't Call Me Charlie!.

Forman was considered a standard Borscht Belt comic, and he performed standup comedy both live and on television (including shows like The Hollywood Palace). He also took on comedic roles in films and on television. Forman appeared in two episodes of The Monkees, first as jealous kids show host "Captain Crocodile" in an eponymous episode, then as Asian criminal "Dragonman" in "Monkees Chow Mein". He also appeared in three Get Smart episodes, including two episodes as "Harry Who" (as per the credits), a parody of Charlie Chan. He also appeared in the final episode of the first season of M*A*S*H as a touring comedian performing for U.S. troops in the Korean War as well as in Episode #18 during the third season of Bewitched as Ho Ho the Clown. He also had roles in films such as the Jerry Lewis film The Errand Boy (1961) as an audio director, The Wheeler Dealers (1963) starring James Garner and Lee Remick, The Wicked Dreams of Paula Schultz (1968), the cult film Candy (1968) as a tough New York cop, and Linda Lovelace for President (1975).

Forman distinguished himself from the field by inventing a character called "The Mashuganishi Yogi", a parody of the Maharishi Mahesh Yogi. In 1968, working with Bill Dana, he produced a comedy album consisting of a faux press conference, in which he responded to mostly-straight questions with funny answers, speaking in a stereotyped Indian accent. He was accompanied with a sitarist, "Harvey Shankar", a parody of Ravi Shankar (played by Dana).

== Later years/death ==
In later television appearances, he would sometimes reprise his Yogi character. Forman died on December 9, 1982, from pulmonary fibrosis.

== Filmography ==
Year	Title	Role	Notes
1954	The Atomic Kid	MP in Hospital	Film debut
1954–1955	The Mickey Rooney Show	Freddie	
1955	The Twinkle in God's Eye	Ted	
1957	Hot Rod Rumble	Benny, Club President	
1957	The Silent Service	Radarman	Episode: The Seahorse Story
1958	The Danny Thomas Show	Man at Lunch	Episode: Terry's Girlfriend
1958	Andy Hardy Comes Home	Beezy 'Beez' Anderson	
1959	The Big Operator	Ray Bailey	
1961	The Errand Boy	Jedson	
1961–1965	The Joey Bishop Show	Charlie Hogan/Dr. Sam Nolan	7 episodes
1963	The Wheeler Dealers	Buster Yarrow	1966
1965–1970	Get Smart	Harry Hoo / Lawyer (Agent 17)	Episodes: 25, 38, 77
1967	Bewitched	Hoho	Episode: Hoho the Clown
1967	The Monkees	Captain Crocodile	S1:E23, "Captain Crocodile"
1967	The Monkees	Dragonman	S1:E26, "Monkee Chow Mein"
1968	The Wicked Dreams of Paula Schultz	Herbert Sweeney	
1968	Candy	Charlie the Cop	
1970	The Boatniks	Lt. Jordan	
1971	Ironside	Lennie Blake	Episode: Murder Impromptu
1973	M*A*S*H	Jackie Flash	Episode: Showtime
1975	Linda Lovelace for President	Chow Ming	
1977	New York, New York	Argumentative Man	
1977	Starsky and Hutch	Freddie Lyle/Sam Spade	Episode: Murder Ward
1977	Three's Company	Policeman	Episode: It's Only Money
1978–1982	Fantasy Island	Various Roles	4 episodes
1980	The Nude Bomb	Agent 13	
1980	The Scarlett O'Hara War	Walter Winchell	TV movie
1981	Earthbound	Madden	
1981	The Incredible Hulk	Promoter	Episode: Half Nelson
1981	Den Tüchtigen gehört die Welt	Eddie Owen	
1982	Double Exposure	Son	Final film
