= Slightly French =

1949 film by Douglas Sirk

- Directed by: Douglas Sirk
- Written by: Karen DeWolf; Herbert Fields
- Produced by: Irving Starr
- Starring: Dorothy Lamour; Don Ameche; Janis Carter
- Cinematography: Charles Lawton Jr.
- Edited by: Al Clark
- Music by: George Duning
- Production company: Columbia Pictures
- Distributed by: Columbia Pictures
- Release date: February 2, 1949
- Running time: 81 minutes
- Country: United States
- Language: English

Slightly French is a 1949 American musical comedy film directed by Douglas Sirk and starring Dorothy Lamour, Don Ameche and Janis Carter. The screenplay concerns a Hollywood director who recruits an American singer.

== Plot ==
After clashing with the French star of his film who then quits, a Hollywood director recruits an American singer whom he tries to pass off as a Frenchwoman.

== Cast ==
- Dorothy Lamour as Mary O'Leary aka Rochelle Olivia
- Don Ameche as John Gayle
- Janis Carter as Louisa Gayle
- Willard Parker as Douglas Hyde
- Adele Jergens as Yvonne La Tour
- Jeanne Manet as Nicolette

== Bibliography ==
- Stern, Michael. Douglas Sirk. Twayne Publishers, 1979.
