= The Happy Road =

1957 French-American comedy film directed by Gene Kelly

- British quad poster
- Directed by: Gene Kelly
- Written by: Arthur Julian; Harry Kurnitz; Joe Morhaim
- Produced by: Gene Kelly
- Starring: Gene Kelly; Barbara Laage; Brigitte Fossey; Bobby Clark; Michael Redgrave
- Cinematography: Robert Juillard
- Edited by: Borys Lewin
- Music by: Georges Van Parys
- Distributed by: Metro-Goldwyn-Mayer
- Release date: June 20, 1957
- Running time: 99 minutes
- Country: United States
- Language: English
- Budget: $575,000
- Box office: $950,000

The Happy Road is a 1957 French-American comedy film starring Gene Kelly, Barbara Laage, Michael Redgrave and Bobby Clark. The plot involves two runaway students and the efforts of their respective parents to locate them.

== Plot ==
Two students (a boy and girl) escape from their Swiss private school and make for Paris. Their respective parents, an American father and a French mother, together embark on a wide journey around the countryside, getting local police involved in finding them, with many whimsical situations, including riding on a police motorcycle, and encountering military maneuvers and a bicycle race.

== Cast ==
- Mike Andrews — Gene Kelly
- Suzanne Duval — Barbara Laage
- Danny Andrews — Bobby Clark
- Janine Duval — Brigitte Fossey
- General Medworth — Michael Redgrave
- Doctor Salaise — Roger Tréville
- Hélène — Colette Dereal
- Madame Fallière — Maryse Martin
- Motorcycle Officer — Van Doude
- Armbruster — Colin Mann
- The Woodcutter — Alexandre Rignault
- David, Earl of Bardingham — T. Bartlett
- Carpenter — Paul Préboist

== Production ==
Writing for TCM on June 22, 2005, Jeremy Arnold observed: “The Happy Road is a modest production (undoubtedly one of the reasons Kelly chose it to direct and produce) and though uneven, it's often warm and charming with some fine comic episodes. At its best, it reveals Kelly relying on his own unique strengths as a film artist. Since MGM played The Happy Road as a second feature on double bills, the movie didn't make much of a dent in moviegoers' consciousness. But it showcased Kelly's skills as a director, and proved he was particularly gifted at directing children.

== Reception ==
In his June 21, 1957, review for The New York Times, Bosley Crowther praises the film as "a lively and charming little tale", highlighting Kelly's multiple roles and concluding “(He)rates a good hand for this picture. So does Metro-Goldwyn-Mayer."

Rotten Tomatoes shows only one review for the film, from Dennis Schwartz, describing it as a “Whimsical comedy that fails to maintain the charm it dishes out.”

According to MGM records, the film earned $325,000 in the US and Canada and $625,000 elsewhere, resulting in a loss of $117,000.

The Happy Road won a Golden Globe award for "Best Film Promoting International Understanding."

== See also ==
- List of American films of 1957
