= The Whip Hand =

1951 film by William Cameron Menzies

- original US half-sheet film poster
- Directed by: William Cameron Menzies; Stuart Gilmore (fill-in)
- Screenplay by: George Bricker; Frank L. Moss; Curt Siodmak (uncredited)
- Story by: Roy Hamilton
- Produced by: Lewis Rachmil
- Starring: Carla Balenda; Elliott Reid
- Cinematography: Nicholas Musuraca
- Edited by: Robert Golden
- Music by: Paul Sawtell
- Production company: RKO Pictures
- Distributed by: RKO Pictures
- Release date: October 24, 1951 (US)
- Running time: 82 minutes
- Country: United States
- Language: English
- Budget: $376,000

The Whip Hand is a 1951 American crime film directed by William Cameron Menzies and starring Carla Balenda and Elliott Reid.

== Plot ==
Journalist Matt Corbin is traveling through Wisconsin on a fishing trip and discovers a nearly deserted town where the few inhabitants are secretive and hostile. A shifty lodge owner named Steve Loomis warns Matt away, claiming that all of the region's fish mysteriously died years ago. The story makes Matt more curious, and his investigation uncovers a Soviet plot to poison the American water supply. He now must return to the city alive.

== Cast ==
- Carla Balenda as Janet Keller
- Elliott Reid as Matt Corbin
- Edgar Barrier as Dr. Edward Keller
- Raymond Burr as Steve Loomis
- Otto Waldis as Dr. Wilhelm Bucholtz
- Michael Steele as Chick
- Lurene Tuttle as Molly Loomis
- Peter Brocco as Nate Garr
- Lewis Martin as Peterson
- Frank Darien as Luther Adams
- Olive Carey as Mabel Turner

== Production ==
In July 1949, RKO Pictures purchased the story written by Roy Hamilton. The film was originally set in New England and was titled The Man He Found. The term "the whip hand" is a horse racing metaphor for having the advantage or upper hand. In the original draft of the film, the villains were escaped German Nazis involved in a plot to hide Adolf Hitler, portrayed by Bobby Watson. However, when studio chief Howard Hughes viewed the completed film in November 1950, he ordered portions of the film reshot because the communists had replaced the Nazis as the world's greatest villains.

Location shooting took place at Big Bear Lake as well as at the RKO ranch in Encino.

The film lost an estimated $225,000.

== Reception ==
In The Philadelphia Inquirer, critic Mildred Martin called the film a "hare-brained melodrama".
