= Dinky (film) =

1935 film by D. Ross Lederman

- Film poster
- Directed by: D. Ross Lederman; Howard Bretherton
- Written by: Harry Sauber; John Fante; Frank Fenton; Gilson Brown
- Starring: Jackie Cooper
- Production company: Warner Bros. Pictures
- Distributed by: Warner Bros. Pictures
- Release date: May 11, 1935
- Running time: 65 minutes
- Country: United States
- Language: English

Dinky is a 1935 American drama film directed by D. Ross Lederman.

== Plot ==
A crooked businessman skips town, leaving his secretary, Martha Daniels, to take the blame for his illegal business dealings. Faced with a prison term, Martha sends her son, "Dinky," to a military academy to spare him the social disgrace.

== Cast ==
- Jackie Cooper as Dinky Daniels
- Mary Astor as Mrs. Martha Daniels
- Roger Pryor as Tom Marsden
- Henry Armetta as Tony Karamazo, the junkman
- Betty Jean Hainey as Mary
- Henry O'Neill as Colonel Barnes
- Jimmy Butler as Cadet Lane
- George Ernest as Jojo
- Edith Fellows as Sally
- Sidney Miller as Sammy
- Richard Quine as Jackie Shaw
