= Carla Balenda =

American actress (1925–2024)

- Born: Sally Bliss; November 22, 1925; Carthage, New York, U.S.
- Died: April 9, 2024 (aged 98); Los Angeles, California, U.S.
- Occupation: Actress
- Years active: 1944–1966
- Spouses: John Martin (1944-1959; divorced); William Rutter (1965-2012; his death)
- Children: 2

Carla Balenda (born Sally Bliss; November 22, 1925 – April 9, 2024) was an American film and television actress. With a career spanning from the 1940s to the 1960s, she was one of the last surviving actresses from the Golden Age of Hollywood.

== Early life ==
Carla Balenda was born as Sally Bliss in Carthage, New York, on November 22, 1925. She attended high school in Baldwin, Long Island, and participated in summer stock theatre.

== Career ==
Balenda had contracts with RKO Pictures and Columbia Pictures, but a 1954 newspaper article noted, "she didn't really hit her stride until she was chosen to be Mickey Rooney's TV love." After being billed as Sally Bliss in "a few minor roles in RKO productions," she changed her name to Carla Balenda. She explained: "Sally Bliss was just too cute. And I'm not cute at all. That name would type me, probably in ingenue roles -- and I'm not the type." On television, Balenda portrayed Pat in The Mickey Rooney Show (1954–1955) and Betty Leonard on The Adventures of Dr. Fu Manchu (1955–1956).

== Personal life and death ==
In 1944, Balenda married her high school sweetheart, John Martin, who was a pilot during World War II. They stayed together for fifteen years, having two boys from the union before divorcing in 1959. She married secondly, in 1965, to William Rutter, until his death in 2012.

Balenda died at the Motion Picture & Television Country House and Hospital in Los Angeles, on April 9, 2024, at the age of 98.

== Filmography ==
Year	Title	Role
1944	Swing in the Saddle	Judy Bayliss
1944	Dancing in Manhattan	Billie
1944	Meet Miss Bobby Socks	Pillow
1945	Eadie Was a Lady	Doris
1945	Rustlers of the Badlands	Sally Boylston
1950	Hunt the Man Down	Rolene Wood
1951	Sealed Cargo	Margaret McLean
1951	The Whip Hand	Janet Keller
1952	The Pace That Thrills	Eve Drake
1952	Outlaw Women	Beth Larabee
1953	Prince of Pirates	Princess Maria
1954	Phantom Stallion	Claire
1966	Seconds	Operating room nurse

== Television ==
- The Mickey Rooney Show: Hey, Mulligan (1954–55)
- The Adventures of Dr. Fu Manchu (1956)
- Perry Mason (1962)
- Wagon Train (1963)
- Lassie (1958–63)
