= Rookie Fireman =

1950 film

- Theatrical release poster
- Directed by: Seymour Friedman
- Screenplay by: Jerry Sackheim
- Story by: Harry Fried
- Produced by: Milton Feldman
- Starring: Bill Williams; Barton MacLane; Marjorie Reynolds; Gloria Henry
- Cinematography: Vincent J. Farrar
- Edited by: Aaron Stell
- Production company: Columbia Pictures
- Distributed by: Columbia Pictures
- Release date: September 8, 1950
- Running time: 63 minutes
- Country: United States
- Language: English

Rookie Fireman is a 1950 American drama film directed by Seymour Friedman, written by Jerry Sackheim and starring Bill Williams, Barton MacLane, Marjorie Reynolds and Gloria Henry The film was released on September 8, 1950, by Columbia Pictures.

== Cast ==
- Bill Williams as Joe Blake
- Barton MacLane as Captain Jess Henshaw
- Marjorie Reynolds as Margie Williams
- Gloria Henry as Peggy Walters
- Richard Quine as Johnny Truitt
- John Ridgely as Harry Williams
- Richard Benedict as Al Greco
- Cliff Clark as Captain Mack Connors
- Barry Brooks as Harris
- George Eldredge as Floyd
- Steve Pendleton as Potts
- Frank Sully as Charlie
- Ted Jordan as Hanover
