= The Mickey Rooney Show =

American TV situation comedy series (1954–1955)

- Also known as: Hey Mulligan
- Genre: Sitcom
- Created by: Blake Edwards; Richard Quine
- Written by: Harry Clork; Maurice Duke; Blake Edwards; Benedict Freedman; Sumner Long; John Fenton Murray; Richard Quine
- Directed by: Leslie H. Martinson; Richard Quine
- Starring: Mickey Rooney; Regis Toomey; Claire Carleton; Carla Balenda; John Hubbard; Joey Forman; Alan Mowbray
- Music by: Van Alexander
- Country of origin: United States
- No. of episodes: 36

Production
- Executive producers: Mickey Rooney; Maurice Duke
- Producer: Joseph Santley

Original release
- Network: NBC
- Release: August 28, 1954 – June 4, 1955

The Mickey Rooney Show is an American television situation comedy that was broadcast on NBC from August 28, 1954, to June 4, 1955. It was also shown with the title Hey Mulligan.

== Premise and characters ==
The show centers around Mickey Mulligan, who works as a page for the IBC television network and takes drama lessons because he wants to become a performer. Mulligan's parents are Joe (a policeman) and Nell (a former burlesque queen). Pat Harding is Mulligan's girlfriend, and Freddie is his friend. Program director Mr. Brown is Mulligan's boss, and Mr. Swift is his drama coach.

In the opening of each episode an off-screen voice's yelling, "Hey Mulligan", causes him to "drop a huge pile of scripts, spill the contents of the office water cooler, or trip on a skateboard."

== Cast ==
- Mickey Mulligan – Mickey Rooney
- Joe Mulligan – Regis Toomey
- Nell Mulligan – Claire Carleton
- Pat Harding – Carla Balenda
- Mr. Brown – John Hubbard
- Freddie – Joey Forman
- Mr. Swift – Alan Mowbray

== Production ==
The Mickey Rooney Show was created by Blake Edwards and Richard Quine. Rooney and Maurice Duke were executive producers. Joseph Santley was the producer. Leslie Martinson and Quine were among the directors. Harry Clork, Duke, Edwards, Benedict Freedman, Sumner Long, John Fenton Murray, and Quine were among the writers. Van Alexander provided the music.

Thirty-six episodes were filmed in black-and-white with a "sweetened laugh track".

Broadcast on Saturdays from 8 to 8:30 p.m., the program's competition included The Jackie Gleason Show. Green Giant and Pillsbury were among the program's sponsors. Although the ratings were low, Pillsbury executives initially wanted NBC to provide a better time slot in return for continued sponsorship. The series ended, however, after Rooney insulted the company's president and the Pillsbury family at a corporate anniversary celebration.

== Critical response ==
Jack Gould, in a review in The New York Times, wrote that Rooney's age undermined his portrayal of Mulligan, "a close-up becomes disconcerting when the firmness of flesh is creased by telltale lines and the youthfully mischievous grin is framed in a 5 o'clock shadow." Gould went on to recommend watching the program, saying, "It sure eases the pains of the middle years, albeit not exactly in the way Mr. Rooney intended."

James Devane wrote in The Cincinnati Enquirer that only the slapstick elements of the premiere episode brought laughter, while the characters and verbal gags elicited mostly yawns. He commented, "Mickey doesn't have very much good material in Hey, Mulligan with which to shine as a TV comedian." He also noted the program's overuse of a laugh track.

A review in the trade publication Billboard said that as the first episode neared its end, "the stunts began to seem too mechanical and too studied, especially since each one was automatically punctuated with a canned roar of laughter." It commended Rooney as a performer and said that the show could gain in popularity "if the slapstick can be restrained from going too far and if the show's other assets are given a chance to pay off".

== Syndication and home video ==
In the 1980s, reruns of The Mickey Rooney Show were shown on the CBN cable service. Timeless Video sold a box set containing 30 episodes of the program.

As at December 2024, the show is available for streaming in Canada on Tubi.
