= Ross Bellah =

American art director

- Born: 27 January 1907
- Died: 2 February 2004 (aged 97)
- Occupation: Art director
- Years active: 1944–1987

Ross Bellah (January 27, 1907 – February 2, 2004) was an American art director, primarily for Columbia Pictures. He was nominated for an Academy Award in the category Best Art Direction for the film The Solid Gold Cadillac. He also worked on most if not all television series produced by Screen Gems, the television subsidiary of Columbia Pictures such as The Donna Reed Show, Dennis the Menace, Hazel, Bewitched, I Dream of Jeannie and The Partridge Family. Bellah appeared as himself in the 1960 short film A New Star in Hollywood documenting his design and construction of the all-wood Bel Air house featured in the film Strangers When We Meet.

== Selected filmography ==
- Her First Romance (1951)
- The Solid Gold Cadillac (1956)
- Strangers When We Meet (1960)
