= The Bell Sisters =

American singing duo

The Bell Sisters were an American singing duo, popular in the 1950s, consisting of the sisters Cynthia and Kay Strother, who adopted their mother's maiden name of Bell.

== History ==
Cynthia Sue Strother was born in Harlan County, Kentucky, on October 4, 1935, and died of heart failure in Las Vegas on February 16, 2024, at the age of 88.

Edith Kay Strother was born in Cynthiana, Kentucky, on March 16, 1940.

The sisters were the daughters of Eugene Rex Strother (1908–1988) and Edith Marie Bell (1912–1992). They had four sisters and one brother. The duo was discovered and a week later signed by RCA Records after appearing on October 31, 1951, on the local Los Angeles television program, "Peter Potter's Search for a Song," singing "Bermuda", which was written by Cynthia, who had appeared as a solo artist twice before on the program, singing other self-penned compositions. But it was on October 31, 1951, that Joe Happy Goday (1910–1997), owner and founder of music publisher Goday Music, Inc., took an interest in the song "Bermuda".

The hit single recording of "Bermuda" for RCA peaked at number 7 in 1952, having a three-month run on the Hit Parade, and eventually selling one million copies. It was followed up by a number 10 hit for their cover version of "Wheel of Fortune" and a Number 19 hit with actor/singer Phil Harris of the song "Piece a'Puddin'".

They appeared in two films, Those Redheads From Seattle and Cruisin' Down the River, both released in 1953. They released eleven records on the RCA Victor label. In May 1952, they appeared in the annual police benefit along with Bob Hope, Jack Benny, and Gene Autry. They were on the television programmes of Hope, Frank Sinatra, and Dinah Shore.
