= Sam Gilman =

American film and television actor

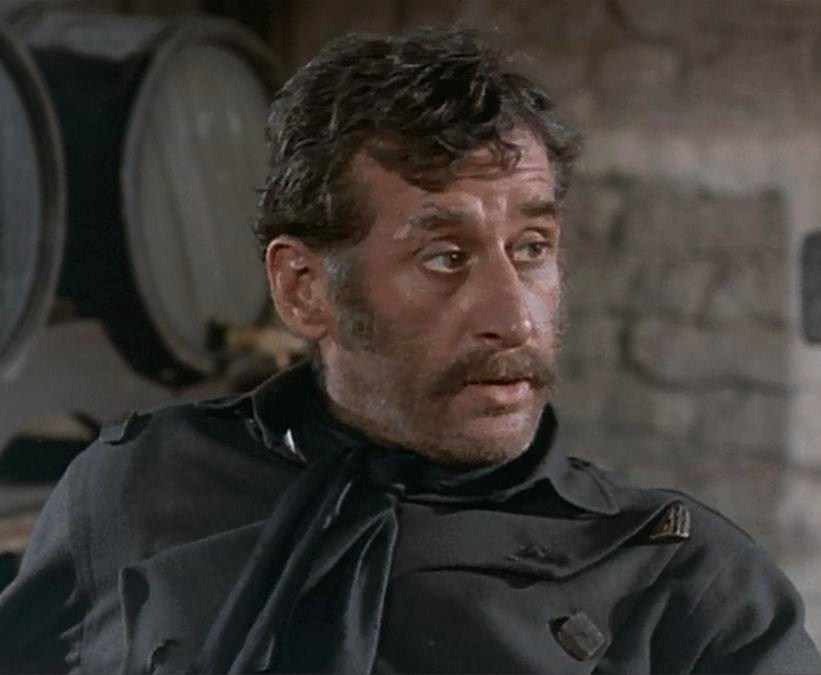
- Gilman in One-Eyed Jacks, 1961
- Born: February 5, 1915; Salem, Massachusetts, U.S.
- Died: December 3, 1985 (aged 70); North Hollywood, California, U.S.
- Occupations: Film and television actor
- Years active: 1950–1983
- Spouses: Mildred Virginia Gilman; Lisabeth Hush (m. 1962; div. 1968)
- Children: 3

Sam Gilman (February 5, 1915 – December 3, 1985) was an American film and television actor. He was perhaps best known for playing Harvey Johnson in the 1961 film One-Eyed Jacks.

== Life and career ==
Gilman was born in Salem, Massachusetts. He worked as a cartoonist on comic books for the comic book packager Funnies Inc., from the 1930s to the 1940s. His screen career began in 1950 with an appearance in the film The Men. Other films Gilman appeared in included Sometimes a Great Notion, PT 109, The Shadow on the Window, Away All Boats, The Missouri Breaks, One-Eyed Jacks (his first western film credit), Wild Rovers, The Last Hard Men, Full of Life and Macon County Line.

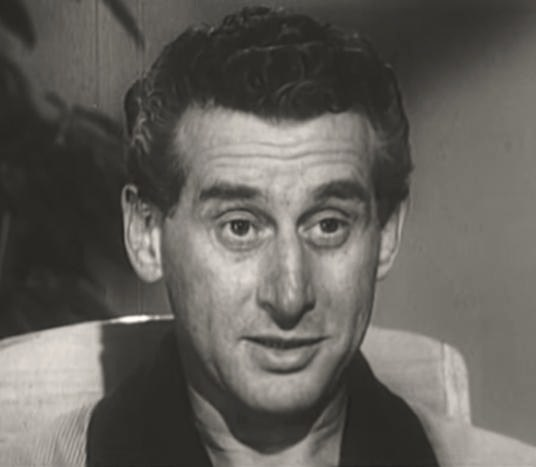
Gilman in Medic, 1954

In 1966, he joined the regular cast of the ABC western television series Shane, playing bartender Sam Grafton. Gilman also guest-starred in television programs such as Gunsmoke, Tales of Wells Fargo, 77 Sunset Strip, Alfred Hitchcock Presents, The Big Valley, Route 66, Star Trek: The Original Series, Ben Casey, Mannix, The Life and Legend of Wyatt Earp, The Fugitive, The Guns of Will Sonnett, Outlaws, The Waltons, The Untouchables and Have Gun, Will Travel. He also worked as an acting coach, helping actors with performing.

His final film credit was for the 1982 film National Lampoon's Movie Madness.

== Personal life and death ==
Gilman had a close friendship with actor Marlon Brando.

Gilman married Lisabeth Hush on January 26, 1962, in Los Angeles. They adopted a son, and they divorced in 1968. Gilman died on December 3, 1985, in North Hollywood, California, at the age of 70.

== Selected filmography ==
- The Silent Service (1958) (Season 2 Episode 21: "The S-44 Story") as Duva
- Alfred Hitchcock Presents (1960) (Season 5 Episode 20: "The Day of the Bullet") as Policeman
- Alfred Hitchcock Presents (1960) (Season 5 Episode 30: "Insomnia") as Fire Captain Frank
- Alfred Hitchcock Presents (1960) (Season 6 Episode 3: "Very Moral Theft") as Charlie
- Alfred Hitchcock Presents (1962) (Season 7 Episode 15: "The Door Without a Key") as Squad Car Officer
- The Alfred Hitchcock Hour (1962) (Season 1 Episode 6: "Final Vow") as Lieutenant Shapiro
- Star Trek: The Original Series (1968) (Season 3 Episode 6: "Spectre of the Gun") as Doc Holliday
