= Phantom Stallion =

1954 film by Harry Keller

- Directed by: Harry Keller
- Written by: Gerald Geraghty
- Produced by: Rudy Ralston
- Starring: Rex Allen; Carla Balenda; Slim Pickens
- Cinematography: Bud Thackery
- Edited by: Harold Minter
- Music by: R. Dale Butts
- Production company: Republic Pictures
- Distributed by: Republic Pictures
- Release date: February 10, 1954
- Running time: 54 minutes
- Country: United States
- Language: English

Phantom Stallion is a 1954 American Western film directed by Harry Keller and starring Rex Allen, Carla Balenda and Slim Pickens. The film is credited as being the last singing cowboy Western.

The film's art direction was by Frank Arrigo.

== Cast ==
- Rex Allen as Rex Allen
- Koko as Rex's Horse
- Slim Pickens as Slim
- Carla Balenda as Claire
- Harry Shannon as Michael Reilly
- Don Haggerty as Foreman Gil
- Peter Price as Tony Reilly
- Rosa Turich as Lucretia
- Zon Murray as Henchman
- Charles La Torre as Escobar
- Rocky Shahan as Henchman

== See also ==
- List of films about horses

== Bibliography ==
- Pitts, Michael R. Western Movies: A Guide to 5,105 Feature Films. McFarland, 2012.
