= Bermuda (song) =

Single by The Bell Sisters
- B-side: "June Night"
- Released: December 17, 1951
- Genre: Pop
- Length: 3:13
- Label: RCA Victor
- Songwriters: Cynthia Strother, Eugene Rex Strother

The Bell Sisters singles chronology
"Bermuda" (1951)	"Wheel of Fortune" (1952)

"Bermuda" is a song written by Cynthia Strother and her father Eugene Rex Strother. It was initially performed and released in 1951 by 16-year-old Cynthia and her 11-year-old sister Kay Strother, who performed together under The Bell Sisters moniker ("Bell" was their mother's maiden name) for RCA Records. Their recording of the song featured Henri René and His Orchestra.

The Bell Sisters' version of the song was its highest charting, and reached #7 on the US pop chart national chart on February 16, 1952.

== Other versions ==
Pop

- Roberta Lee released a version of the song for Decca Records (Decca #27893) in December 1951.
- Jimmy Palmer released a version of the song for Mercury Records (Mercury #6774) in 1952.
- Mimi Martel (with Nancy Brookes and the Les Morgan Orchestra) released a version of the song for Tops Records (Tops #319 and Waldorf A/B #108) in 1952.
- The Bon-Aires released a version of the song for King Records (King #4975) in 1956.
- Harry Roy released a version of the song for Nixa Records (Nixa #7746) in 1952.
- The Crew-Cuts released a version of the song for RCA Records (RCA #42-7577) in 1959.
- Dick Lee released a version of the song for MGM Records (MGM #12774) in 1959.
- Troy Walker released a version of the song on his LP for HiFi Records (HiFi #L1021) in 1960.
- Ray Sharpe released a version of the song as the B-side to his 1960 single on Jamie Records (Jamie #1149) "Gonna Let It Go This Time".
- Roger Smith released a version of the song on his 1960 album for Warner Records, Beach Romance (Warner #1305).
- Linda Scott released a version of the song as a single on Canadian-American Records (Canadian-American #134) in January 1962 where it reached number 16 on the US adult contemporary chart and number 70 on the Billboard pop chart.
- The Four Seasons released a version of the song as a single on Gone Records (Gone #5122) in February 1962.
- Santo & Johnny released a version of the song on their LP for Canadian-American Records (Canadian-American #SCALP-1018) in 1965.

Jazz

- Ray Anthony and His Orchestra released a version of the song for Capitol Records (Capitol #1956) which reached number 24 on the US pop chart national chart on February 23, 1952.
- Maurice King & The Wolverines released a version of the song for Okeh Records (Okeh #6868) in 1952 → Re: Clarence Maurice King Sr. (1911–1992)

== Popular culture ==
- The song is featured in Allison Anders' 1996 musical biopic, Grace of My Heart, loosely based on the life of Carole King.
