= Elaine Devry =

American actress (1930–2023)

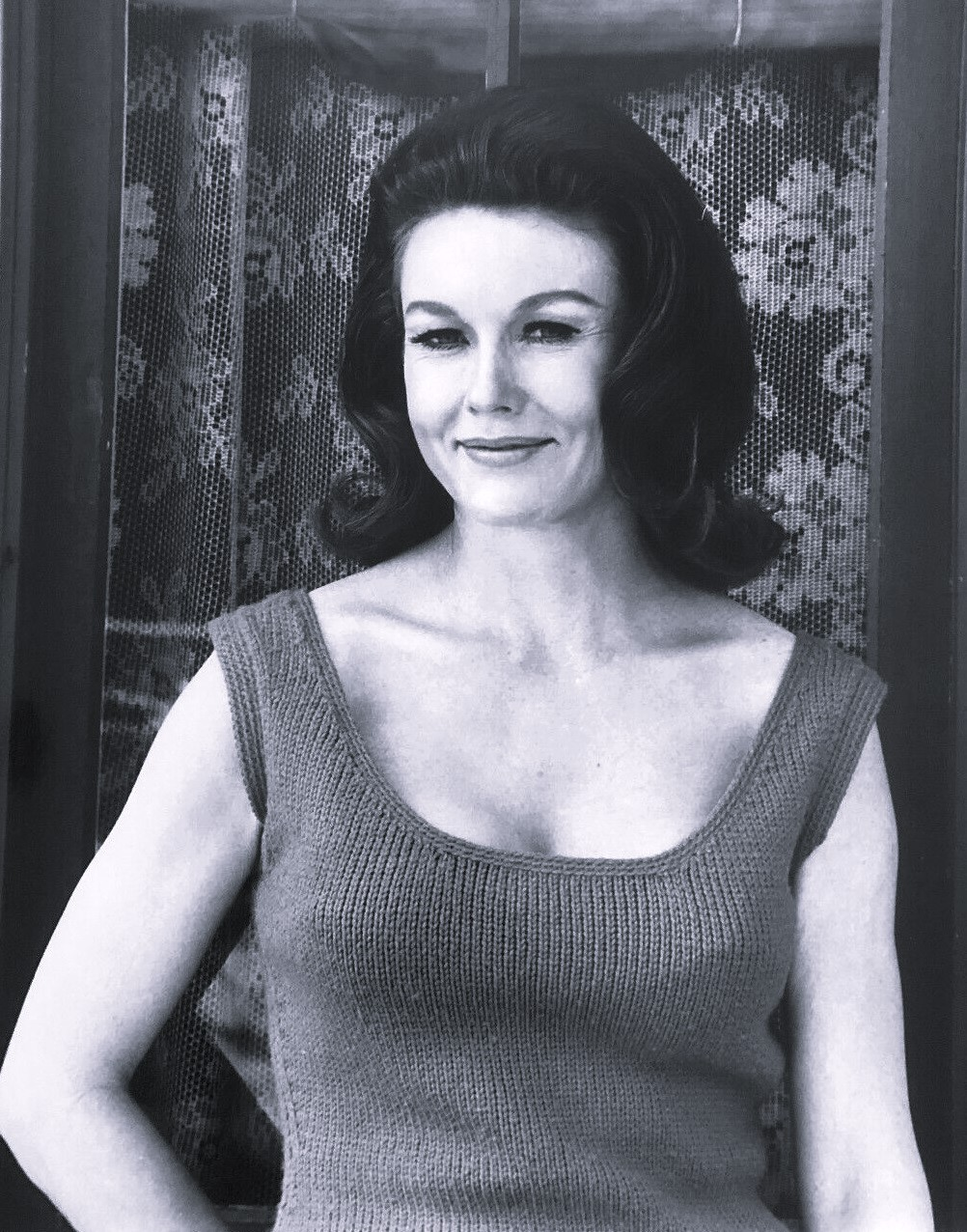
- Devry in With Six You Get Eggroll (1968)
- Born: Thelma Elaine Mahnken; January 10, 1930; Compton, California, U.S.
- Died: September 20, 2023 (aged 93); Grants Pass, Oregon, U.S.
- Other name: Elaine Davis
- Education: Compton Junior College
- Occupation: Actress
- Years active: 1953–1999
- Notable work: The Atomic Kid; Diary of a Madman; A Guide for the Married Man
- Spouses: Dan Ducich (m. 1948; div. 1952) Mickey Rooney (m. 1952; div. 1958) Will J. White (died 1992)
- Children: 2

Elaine Devry (born Thelma Elaine Mahnken; January 10, 1930 – September 20, 2023) was an American actress.

== Early life ==
Thelma Elaine Mahnken was born on January 10, 1930, to Fred P. and Hortense Mahnken, in Compton, California, where she was raised. She has a brother Jack three years older. She began to model at age fifteen. She graduated from Compton High School and later attended Compton Junior College, where she was homecoming queen.

After marrying her high school boyfriend, Dan Ducich, in 1948, the couple lived in Butte, Montana, until their 1952 divorce, upon which Devry returned to California, working as a carhop at the Dolores Drive-In on Wilshire Boulevard.

== Career ==
Originally billed as Elaine Davis, her early acting roles included her first film, The Atomic Kid, in which she and Mickey Rooney co-starred. She appeared in films such as China Doll (1958) and A Guide for the Married Man (1967). Devry made three guest appearances on Perry Mason, including the title role of defendant Janice Wainwright in the 1962 episode "The Case of the Shapely Shadow". That same year, she appeared with actor John Clarke in a commercial for Kool cigarettes.

Devry also appeared in many television series, including Death Valley Days in the episode "Yankee Confederate" with Tod Andrews; Bonanza in the episode "The Search" (season 6, episode 21, 1965); 77 Sunset Strip; Burke's Law; Family Affair; I Dream of Jeannie; Marcus Welby, M.D.; Dragnet; and Tales of Wells Fargo. She appeared on My Three Sons on season 10, episode 1 as Millicent Sawyer, a single woman who was set up on a date with Steven Douglas by his daughter-in-law Katie, but instead he meets Barbara and falls in love.

== Personal life ==
Devry married Dan Ducich, her high school boyfriend, in Butte, Montana, in September 1948. The following year, Ducich was convicted of multiple robberies in Los Angeles and sentenced to five years' probation. The couple resided in Butte, but divorced in 1952. She also had a six-year marriage to actor Mickey Rooney, whom she met in 1952, and married on November 15, 1952, in Las Vegas. The couple had a son and a daughter and divorced in 1958. (This is questionable as Mickey Rooney's biography does not list having any children with Elaine Devry.) Speaking in 1967, Devry said that although she liked Rooney "very much", she was still in love with her first husband, but that he did not care. She thought in time that she could "learn to love him", but that she was "young and foolish" and by the end, had had enough. Following her eight years of marriage, she expressed to being "marriage shy", despite numerous proposals from other actors but that she was "afraid to take the chance". Despite claims from Rooney that she received a $125,000 mansion, a summer home and a 10-year annual $21,000 alimony in divorce settlement, she disputed the claim, saying that she instead received a $75,000 studio home with a $45,000 mortgage, a summer home and that the alimony was only $21,000 in the first year.

Devry was married to actor Will J. White until his death on April 23, 1992, in Grants Pass, Oregon. From 2005, Devry lived on a ranch in Oregon. She died in Grants Pass on September 20, 2023, at the age of 93.

== Filmography ==
Year	Title	Role	Notes
1953	A Slight Case of Larceny	Girl in Car	Uncredited
1954	The Atomic Kid	Audrey Nelson	
1958	China Doll	Alice Nichols	
1961	The Last Time I Saw Archie	Carole	
1961	Man-Trap	Liz Addams	
1963	Diary of a Madman	Jeanne D'Arville	
1967	A Guide for the Married Man	Jocelyn Montgomery	
1969	With Six You Get Eggroll	Cleo	
1970	Once You Kiss a Stranger	Sharon	
1970	The Cheyenne Social Club	Pauline	
1971	Bless the Beasts and Children	Cotton's Mother	
1973	The Boy Who Cried Werewolf	Sandy Bridgestone	
1974	Herbie Rides Again	Secretary	
1999	Heart to Heart.com	Aimee	
