= Jeanne Manet =

French actress (1917–2012)

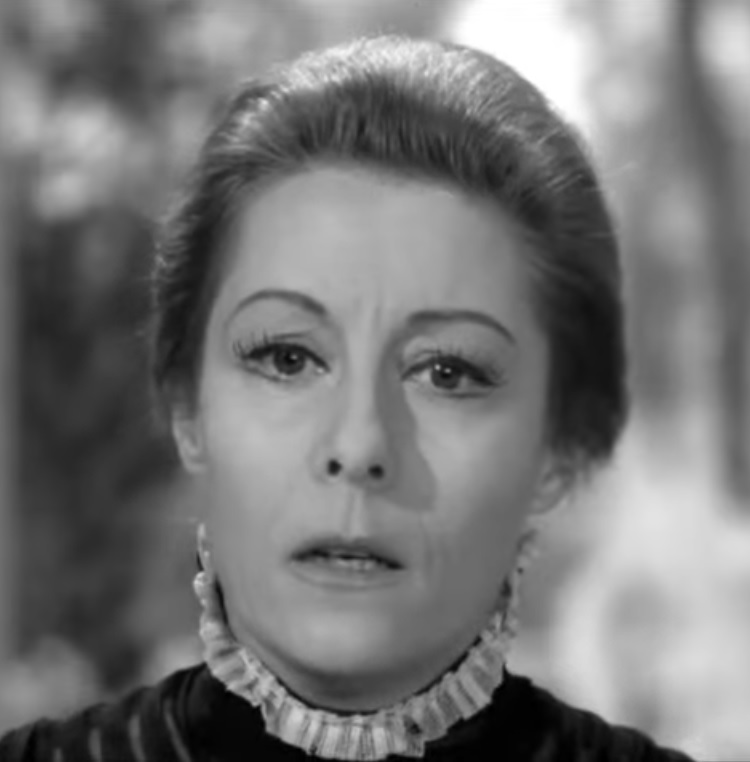
- Jeanne Manet in the TV series One Step Beyond, episode Premonition - cropped screenshot
- Born: 27 November 1917; Houilles, Seine-et-Oise, France
- Died: 15 January 2012 (aged 94); Nogent-le-Rotrou, France
- Other names: Gilberte Jeanne Lachmann, dite Manet
- Occupation: Actress
- Years active: 1937–1961 (film)
- Spouse: Pat Hurst (1946–?)

Gilberte Marcelle Lachmann (27 November 1917 – 15 January 2012), better known as Jeanne Manet, was a French film actress. After appearing in some French films, Manet moved to Hollywood. Originally regarded there as a rising starlet, her roles were generally supporting ones.

During the occupation of France, Manet starred in Vive la Liberté, a film made by the French underground.

In 1946, Manet wed Pat Hurst, who was then an Office of Strategic Services officer. After World War II ended, he returned to his former career of acting, and she temporarily retired. Actress Dorothy Lamour was credited with persuading Manet to leave retirement and return to acting.

== Selected filmography ==
- Long Live Liberty (1946)
- Slightly French (1949)
- Operation Mad Ball (1957)
- The Flying Fontaines (1959)
- Pepe (1960)

== Bibliography ==
- Troyan, Michael. A Rose for Mrs. Miniver: The Life of Greer Garson. University Press of Kentucky, 1999.
