= William Leslie (actor) =

American film and television actor (1925–2005)

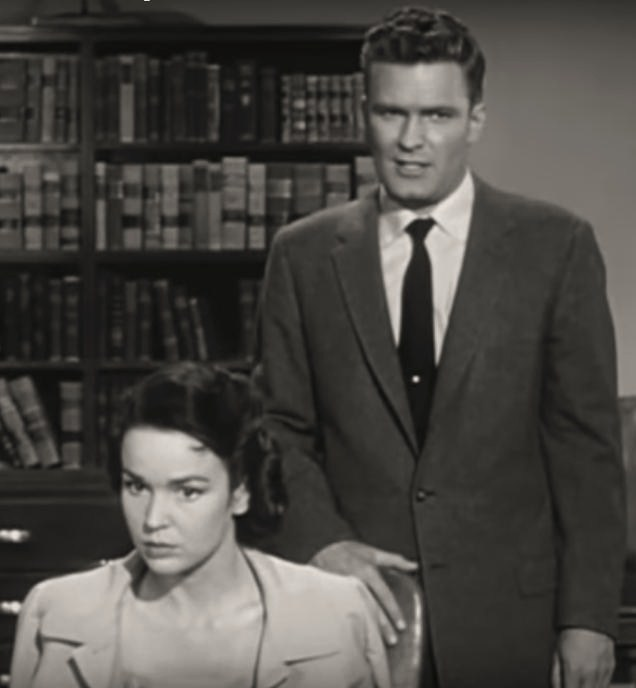
- Leslie (right) with Kathryn Crosby in The Night the World Exploded, 1957
- Born: May 27, 1925; Seagraves, Texas, U.S.
- Died: December 19, 2005 (aged 80); Apple Valley, California, U.S.
- Education: University of Colorado
- Occupations: Film and television actor
- Years active: 1952–1967

William Leslie (May 27, 1925 – December 19, 2005) was an American film and television actor.

== Life and career ==
Leslie was born in Seagraves, Texas. He attended the University of Colorado, and served in the United States Navy during World War II. He began his screen career in 1952, starring as Clint Rust in the film Scorching Fury starring along with Richard Devon and Sherwood Price. He then appeared in the 1953 film Forever Female.

Later in his career, Leslie appeared in two films in 1955 with Lucy Marlow. He guest-starred in television programs including Fury, Tales of Wells Fargo, The Donna Reed Show, My Three Sons, Dr. Kildare, Ironside, The Adventures of Rin Tin Tin, Hawaiian Eye, Combat! and Father Knows Best. He also appeared in films such as Up Periscope, Bring Your Smile Along, Hellcats of the Navy, The Horse Soldiers, The Night the World Exploded, Operation Mad Ball, Mutiny in Outer Space, The Long Gray Line, The White Squaw, The Couch, The Lineup, Return to Warbow and Magnificent Obsession.

== Death ==
Leslie died on December 19, 2005 in Apple Valley, California, at the age of 80.
