= The Atomic Kid =

1954 film by Leslie H. Martinson

- Australian theatrical release insert poster
- Directed by: Leslie H. Martinson
- Screenplay by: Benedict Freedman; John Fenton Murray
- Story by: Blake Edwards
- Produced by: Maurice Duke; Mickey Rooney
- Starring: Mickey Rooney; Robert Strauss; Elaine Devry
- Cinematography: John L. Russell
- Edited by: Fred Allen
- Music by: Van Alexander
- Production company: Mickey Rooney Productions
- Distributed by: Republic Pictures
- Release date: December 8, 1954
- Running time: 86 minutes
- Country: United States
- Language: English

The Atomic Kid is a 1954 American black-and-white science fiction comedy film directed by Leslie H. Martinson and starring Mickey Rooney and Robert Strauss. It was distributed by Republic Pictures and produced by Maurice Duke and Mickey Rooney.

== Plot ==
While uranium prospector Barnaby "Blix" Waterberry is in the desert, eating a peanut butter sandwich, he wanders into an active atomic bomb test site and is accidentally exposed to radiation from a direct overhead A-bomb blast. He miraculously survives, becoming radioactive, and in the process gaining special powers. He is then recruited for his powers by the FBI to help break up a spy ring. After helping to capture the spy ring, Blix and his former nurse Audrey Nelson decide to get married. They head toward Las Vegas and get lost in the desert along the way. They stop at a lone ranch-style house they come upon to ask for directions, only to discover that the house is open and mannequins have been placed in the furnished house. Blix has somehow driven into another active atomic bomb test site! In a dead panic, he hurriedly drives himself and his fiancée away from ground zero before history has a chance to repeat itself.

== Cast ==
- Mickey Rooney as Barnaby "Blix" Waterberry
- Robert Strauss as Stan Cooper
- Elaine Devry as Audrey Nelson
- Bill Goodwin as Dr. Rodell
- Robert Emmett Keane as Mr. Reynolds
- Whit Bissell as Dr. Edgar Pangborn
- Joey Forman as Hospital MP
- Dan Riss as Chief Agent Jim
- Peter Leeds as Agent Bill
- Hal March as Agent Ray
- George E. Mather as 1st Sergeant
- Fay Roope as General Lawlor
- Bill Welsh as Commentator
- Stanley Adams as Wildcat Hooper
- Robert Nichols as Bob
- Paul Dubov as Anderson
- Peter Brocco as Comrade Mosley
- Trustin Howard as Corporal
- Charles J. Conrad as Scientist
- Sig Frohlich as Photographer
- Milton Frome as Communications Man

== Production ==
The film's screenplay is based on a story by Blake Edwards.

Mickey Rooney's character Barnaby "Blix" Waterberry wanders into an atomic test site, and, as one reviewer describes, "Mannequins are depicted sitting around the dinner table in front of their plastic meal, awaiting the predetermined bomb drop ... Rooney remains with the mannequin family and discovers at the last minute that an atomic bomb will be detonated over his head. In a deliberately humorous scene, Rooney frantically tries to find a place to hide from the approaching explosion, only to close his eyes and stick his fingers in his ears as the bomb goes off".

Nurse Audrey Nelson (Elaine Devry), who marries "Blix" at the end, is the only female character in the film's opening credits and promotional posters, where she is billed as Elaine Davis. At the time The Atomic Kid was being filmed, Devry/Davis was married to Rooney in real life.

== In popular culture ==
- This is the feature film showing in 1955 at the Town Theater in Hill Valley in 1985's science fiction comedy Back to the Future.

== Bibliography ==
- Ted Okuda, "The Atomic Kid: Radioactivity Finds Andy Hardy" in Science Fiction America: Essays on SF Cinema (edited by David J. Hogan; McFarland, 2006), pp. 120–129.
- Bill Warren. Keep Watching The Skies, Vol I: 1950–1957. Jefferson, North Carolina: McFarland & Company, 1982. ISBN 0-89950-032-3.
- David Wingrove, Science Fiction Film Source Book (Longman Group Limited, 1985).
