= Strangers When We Meet (film) =

1960 film by Richard Quine

- Directed by: Richard Quine
- Written by: Evan Hunter
- Based on: Strangers When We Meet by Evan Hunter
- Produced by: Richard Quine
- Starring: Kirk Douglas; Kim Novak; Ernie Kovacs; Barbara Rush; Walter Matthau
- Cinematography: Charles Lang
- Edited by: Charles Nelson
- Music by: George Duning
- Production companies: Bryna Productions; Quine Productions
- Distributed by: Columbia Pictures
- Release date: June 30, 1960
- Running time: 117 minutes
- Country: United States
- Language: English
- Box office: $3,400,000 (US/ Canada)

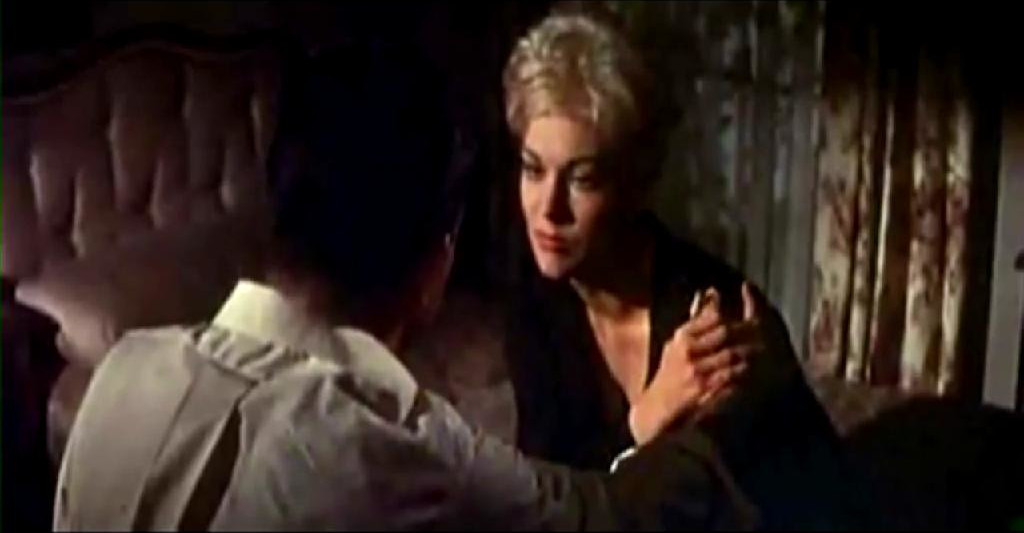
John Bryant and Kim Novak

Strangers When We Meet is a 1960 American drama film about two married neighbors who have an affair. The movie was adapted by Evan Hunter from his novel of the same name and directed by Richard Quine. The film stars Kirk Douglas, Kim Novak, Ernie Kovacs, Barbara Rush and Walter Matthau.

The picture was filmed in Los Angeles, with scenes shot in Beverly Hills, Brentwood, Bel Air, Santa Monica and Malibu.

== Plot ==
Larry Coe is a Los Angeles architect who is married with two kids. He has a very bright wife, Eve. She is ambitious for him, but he wants to do work that is more imaginative than the commercial buildings that he has been designing. He meets with Roger Altar, an author, to discuss building a house that will be an "experiment" and something Coe wants to do more of, something original.

Maggie Gault is one of his neighbors; her son is friends with his. She tells Larry that she has seen some of his previously constructed houses and thinks that the more unconventional houses are the best. This encouragement is what he needs from his wife but has not been able to get.

Both Larry and Maggie are generally dissatisfied with their marriages. Larry's wife is too hard-headed and practical, and Maggie's husband is not interested in having sex with her. So they have an affair that involves meeting in secret. They both know what they are doing is wrong, and they are devoted to their children.

Felix Anders is a neighbor who snoops around and finds out about their affair. His leering and insinuations make Larry realize the risks that he is taking. He tells Maggie that they should not see each other for a while. Felix, in the meantime, makes a play for Larry's wife. In a way, Felix is a personification of the tawdriness of Larry and Maggie's affair. Eve has no interest in Felix's advances and rejects him in dramatic fashion. In the aftermath, she comes to terms with the fact that Larry has been unfaithful. After confronting him, they agree to stay together and move to Hawaii, where Larry has been offered a job to design a city.

Altar's house is finished but still empty. After Larry phones her, Maggie makes one last appointment to meet him at the newly completed home. Maggie is exploring the outside of the house and peeking through the windows when Larry arrives. They talk about how they can never be together. Larry wishes that he and Maggie could live in the house; if they did, he would surround it with a moat and never leave it. Maggie says that she loves him.

The contractor for the house arrives and thinks Maggie is Larry's wife. They both take a moment to savor the irony of his remark, and Maggie drives away.

== Cast ==
- Kirk Douglas as Larry Coe
- Kim Novak as Margaret Gault
- Ernie Kovacs as Roger Altar
- Barbara Rush as Eve Coe
- Walter Matthau as Felix Anders
- Virginia Bruce as Mrs. Wagner
- Kent Smith as Stanley Baxter
- Helen Gallagher as Betty Anders
- John Bryant as Ken Gault
- Sue Ane Langdon as Daphne
- Nancy Kovack as Marcia

== Production ==
In an unusual move for a Hollywood production, art director Ross Bellah elected to have a real house built during the course of filming to act as a stand-in for the one that Kirk Douglas's character designs. Bellah and Carl Anderson designed a wood-framed 3,800-square-foot house which was then constructed at 930 Chantilly Road in Bel Air. Building material manufacturers supplied construction materials in exchange for publicity. The Weyerhaeuser Company was the main supplier of wood products during construction and produced its own short film, titled A New Star in Hollywood, that documented the construction process. The Ludowici-Celadon Company produced matte white clay roof tiles for the house.

Because the film's story was set over the course of construction, contractors had to align their schedule with that of the film crew. The house proved to be a valuable financial investment for the studio, valued at $250,000 upon its completion in 1960. The residence was significantly remodeled after the film's release, but remains standing.

== Reception ==
Variety said that the film is "...easy on the eyes but hard on the intellect...an old-fashioned soap opera", and that "It is a rather pointless, slow-moving story, but it has been brought to the screen with such skill that it charms the spectator into an attitude of relaxed enjoyment, much the same effect as that produced by a casual daydream fantasy". Time magazine called the movie "pure tripe". "Unvaried strangulated hush" is how film critic Stanley Kauffmann, in The New Republic, described Novak's diction. Craig Butler at AllMovie says that Douglas "seems a little out of place", and that the screenplay is "predictable".

== See also ==
- List of American films of 1960
