= Richard Quine =

American actor (1920–1989)

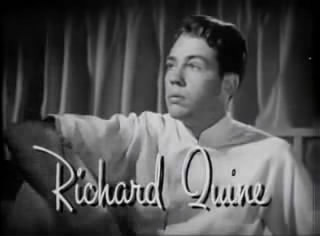
- Quine in Dr. Gillespie's New Assistant (1942)
- Born: November 12, 1920; Detroit, Michigan, U.S.
- Died: June 10, 1989 (aged 68); Los Angeles, California, U.S.
- Resting place: Westwood Village Memorial Park
- Occupations: Director; actor; singer
- Years active: 1933–1980
- Spouses: Susan Paley (m. 1942; dissolved 1942) Susan Peters (m. 1943; div. 1948) Barbara Bushman (m. 1951; div. 1960) Fran Jeffries (m. 1965; div. 1970) Diana Balfour (m. 1977)
- Children: 3

Richard Quine (November 12, 1920 – June 10, 1989) was an American director, actor, and singer.

He began acting as a child in radio, vaudeville, and stage productions before being signed to Metro-Goldwyn-Mayer in his early twenties. When his acting career began to wane after World War II, Quine began working as a film director. He later moved into producing and directing television. Quine's films as director include Bell, Book and Candle (1958), The World of Suzie Wong (1960), Paris When It Sizzles (1964), How to Murder Your Wife (1965), and The Prisoner of Zenda (1979). George Axelrod called him "sweet and highly talented, but totally insane, which made him exactly my kind of person."

== Career ==
=== Child actor ===
Born in Detroit, Quine's father was an actor. Quine's family moved to Los Angeles when he was six years old. As a child, he began working as a radio actor and became a minor radio star. He then appeared in vaudeville before moving on to stage roles.

Quine made his film debut in the drama Cavalcade (1933). He could also be seen in The World Changes (1933) (alongside a young Mickey Rooney), Counsellor-at-Law (1933), Jane Eyre (1934, as John Reed), Dames (1934), Wednesday's Child (1934) with Frankie Thomas, Little Men (1934), Life Returns (1935), A Dog of Flanders (1935) with Thomas, and Dinky (1935) with Jackie Cooper.

=== New York ===
Quine left Los Angeles for New York City to return to stage acting. In 1939, Quine made his Broadway debut in the Jerome Kern/Oscar Hammerstein II stage musical Very Warm for May in 1939, which ran for 59 performances. The following year, he was cast as Frank Lippincott in the Broadway production of My Sister Eileen starring Shirley Booth which was a hit.

=== MGM actor ===
His role in the stage version of My Sister Eileen led to Quine's being signed with Metro-Goldwyn-Mayer. Quine's first film for MGM was Babes on Broadway (1941), starring Judy Garland and Mickey Rooney. Rooney and Quine had been friends since childhood.

While at MGM, Quine also appeared in Tish (1942), with Susan Peters who would later become his second wife, and For Me and My Gal (1942), playing Judy Garland's brother. Columbia borrowed him to reprise his stage role in My Sister Eileen (1942).

At MGM he had a good role in Dr. Gillespie's New Assistant (1942), alongside Peters, and was in Stand by for Action (1942) and the propaganda short The Rear Gunner (1943).

Walter Wanger borrowed Quine for We've Never Been Licked (1943), a wartime propaganda drama, where Quine was top billed.

Just as his acting career seemed about to take off, he had to serve in the United States Coast Guard. While in the Coast Guard, he became a lieutenant and served in public relations department in San Diego, California.

After the war, Quine's acting career stalled. He appeared in The Cockeyed Miracle (1946), Words and Music (1948) and Command Decision (1948).

=== Columbia and becoming a film director ===
Quine and friend William Asher then decided to get into production and directing. The two set about adapting "Leather Gloves," a short story that appeared in the Saturday Evening Post. The story was later adapted by another writer, but Quine and Asher were hired to produce and direct the 1948 film version released by Columbia Pictures.

Reportedly Harry Cohn offered to buy the script outright but they wanted to direct. Cohn responded: "How the hell do you think you can make a picture?" But then later another Columbia executive told Quine, "Mr. Cohn tells me you're going to direct a picture."

He was still under contract to MGM when the film was made. The film was successful and Quine was hired to a long-term contract at Columbia.

Quine continued to act for a while. He was third billed in The Clay Pigeon (1949), a low budget noir directed by Richard Fleischer and written by Carl Foreman at RKO. He had support roles in No Sad Songs for Me (1950) and Rookie Fireman (1950), both at Columbia.

At Columbia he directed some comedy shorts: A Slip and a Miss (1950) with Hugh Herbert, Foy Meets Girl (1950) with Eddie Foy, Jr, The Awful Sleuth with Bert Wheeler, and Woo-Woo Blues (1951) with Herbert.

In July 1951 he signed a seven-year contract with Columbia to direct.

Quine's first solo effort as director was the musical comedy The Sunny Side of the Street (1951) starring Frankie Laine. He followed it with Purple Heart Diary (1951) with Frances Langford.

=== Collaboration with Blake Edwards ===
Quine then directed a series of films he co wrote with Blake Edwards: Sound Off (1952) with Mickey Rooney, Rainbow 'Round My Shoulder (1952) with Frankie Laine, All Ashore (1953) with Rooney and Dick Haymes, and Cruisin' Down the River (1954) with Haymes. These were all musicals but they also made a film noir, Drive a Crooked Road (1954) with Rooney. Without Edwards, Quine directed Siren of Bagdad (1953), for producer Sam Katzman. Quine and Edwards entered television with The Mickey Rooney Show (1954–55) which lasted for a season of 34 episodes. Quine created it and Edwards was chief writer.

Without Edwards, Quine directed episodes of Footlights Theater, General Electric Theater, and The Ford Television Theatre. Quine directed the film noir Pushover (1954) that launched Kim Novak as a star. Universal-International borrowed him to direct Tony Curtis in a musical, So This Is Paris (1954). Quine helped Edwards write the film that became Edwards' first feature as director, Bring Your Smile Along (1955) with Laine. Edwards and Quine wrote the script for a musical remake of My Sister Eileen (1955), which Quine directed, and He Laughed Last (1956), which Edwards directed.

=== Leading director/producer ===
By then Quine was established as one of Columbia's leading directors. His films included The Solid Gold Cadillac (1956) and Full of Life (1956) with Judy Holliday; Operation Mad Ball (1957) with Jack Lemmon and Ernie Kovacs, with Blake Edwards helping write the script; Bell, Book and Candle (1958) with James Stewart, Novak, Kovacs and Lemmon. He made It Happened to Jane (1959) with Doris Day and Lemmon, produced by Day's film production company, Arwin Productions.

Quine set up his own film production company, Quine Productions, and secured a financing and distribution deal through Columbia Pictures. Quine Productions' first film was Strangers When We Meet (1960) with Kirk Douglas, Novak and Kovaks; the film was co-produced with Douglas' film production company, Bryna Productions.

Ray Stark hired him at the last minute to replace Jean Negulesco on The World of Suzie Wong (1960) with William Holden and Nancy Kwan at Paramount. Back at Columbia Quine did the narration for The Wackiest Ship in the Army (1960) with Lemmon.

Quine announced he would do several projects for his own company: The Image Makers with Glenn Ford, Roar Like a Dove with Doris Day, and The Fannie Brice Story for Ray Stark. He was also going to do Man Hunt in Kenya with William Holden. None of these films were made. He produced and directed Lemmon, Fred Astaire and Novak in The Notorious Landlady (1962), co written by Edwards. He was going to make A Bolt Out of the Blue and Fair Game with Holden and direct Sherlock Holmes on Broadway. None of these projects happened.

Quine directed and produced Paris When It Sizzles (1964) with Holden and Audrey Hepburn, done for his own company via Paramount. He went to Warner Bros. to direct Sex and the Single Girl (1964) with Curtis and Natalie Wood, then did How to Murder Your Wife (1965) with Lemmon (as a co-production between Quine Productions and Lemmon's Jalem Productions).

Quine produced and directed Synanon (1965) for Columbia, a little seen film about addicts. He returned to TV producing and directing episodes of the short-lived The Jean Arthur Show (1966). That series also lasted one season.

Quine directed Hotel (1967) for Warners. He was going to film Across the River and into the Trees but it was never made. Instead he did two films for Paramount, Oh Dad, Poor Dad, Mamma's Hung You in the Closet and I'm Feelin' So Sad (1967) for Ray Stark, and A Talent for Loving (1969). He was also meant to film The Owl and the Pussycat but Herbert Ross ended up doing it, with Barbra Streisand and George Segal.

=== Lyricist ===
In addition to producing, directing and screenwriting, Quine was a lyricist. He wrote the lyrics for "Be Prepared," a song included in the film It Happened to Jane (1959), which he also produced and directed. In 1962, Quine wrote two songs, "Going Steady With a Dream" and "Strangers When We Meet," the latter the theme to the 1960 film of the same name, which Quine directed, and also for the film Don't Knock the Twist. Quine also wrote the theme song to his 1964 film Sex and the Single Girl.

=== 1970s ===
Quine returned to acting with a role in the movie Original: Do Not Project (1972). In the 1970s, Quine directed The Moonshine War (1970) at MGM and a pilot for a show based on Catch-22 starring Richard Dreyfuss.

He directed three episodes of Peter Falk's Columbo, including "Dagger of the Mind," an episode set in Britain. He also worked on another, much less successful NBC Mystery Movie series, McCoy, reuniting him with star Tony Curtis, whom Quine had directed in So This Is Paris and Sex and the Single Girl (1964). Quine's other directorial credits include W (1974) with Twiggy, and The Specialists (1975), and episodes of Hec Ramsey, McCloud and Project U.F.O.. His final completed film as a director was the film The Prisoner of Zenda (1979) starring Peter Sellers. Quine was hired to direct another Sellers film, The Fiendish Plot of Dr. Fu Manchu (1980). Before the script was even completed, Quine was fired owing to "creative differences" with Sellers.

== Personal life ==
Quine was married five times and had three children. His first marriage was in January 1942 to showgirl and model Susan Paley, several years his senior. His second marriage was to actress Susan Peters. They were married on November 7, 1943, at the Westwood Community Church in Los Angeles. On New Year's Day 1945, the couple were on a duck hunting trip when Peters dropped her rifle. The gun discharged, hitting Peters in the stomach. The bullet lodged in her spine, leaving her paralyzed from the waist down. On April 17, 1946, the couple adopted a ten-day-old baby boy whom they named Timothy Richard Quine. They separated on March 1, 1948, and were divorced later that year. In October 1952, Peters died of a chronic kidney infection and bronchial pneumonia, both of which were hastened by dehydration and starvation because she had stopped eating and drinking in the last few weeks of her life.

In September 1951, Quine married Barbara Bushman, the granddaughter of actor Francis X. Bushman. The couple had two children before separating in May 1958. They were divorced in March 1960.

While Quine was separated from his third wife, he began dating actress Kim Novak, whom he had previously directed in Pushover (1954) and Bell, Book and Candle (1958). In 1959 the two became engaged while working on their third film together, Strangers When We Meet (1960). They planned to marry when shooting completed on Strangers but Novak ended the relationship shortly before the film was completed. He later dated actresses Judy Holliday, whom he had directed in Full of Life and The Solid Gold Cadillac (both 1956) and Natalie Wood (whom he also directed in Sex and the Single Girl (1964). While directing Sex and the Single Girl, Quine met and began dating one of the film's stars, Fran Jeffries. On January 4, 1965, they married in Rosarito Beach, Mexico. The couple separated on June 10, 1968. In July 1969, Quine filed for divorce, citing "extreme cruelty." Their divorce became final in December 1970.

In 1977, Quine married Diana Balfour. They remained married until Quine's death in 1989.

== Death ==
After an extended period of depression and poor health, Quine shot himself in the head at his Los Angeles home on June 10, 1989. He was taken to UCLA Medical Center, where he died at the age of 68. His remains are interred in the Room of Prayer columbarium at Westwood Memorial Park in Los Angeles.

== Filmography ==
Film
Year	Title	Role	Notes
1933	Cavalcade		Uncredited
1933	The World Changes	Richard, as a Boy	Uncredited
1933	Counsellor at Law	Richard Dwight, Jr.	
1934	Jane Eyre	John Reed	
1934	Dames	Unconfirmed role	
1934	Wednesday's Child	Bobby's antagonistic buddy	Uncredited
1934	Little Men	Ned	
1935	Life Returns	Mickey	
1935	A Dog of Flanders	Nicky Duval	
1935	Dinky	Jackie Shaw	
1939	King of the Underworld	Medical student	Uncredited
1941	Babes on Broadway	Morton Hammond	
1941	Tish	Theodore "Ted" Bowser	
1942	My Sister Eileen	Frank Lippincott	
1942	For Me and My Gal	Danny Hayden	Uncredited
1942	Dr. Gillespie's New Assistant	Dr. Dennis Lindsey	
1942	Stand By for Action	Ensign Lindsay	
1943	The Rear Gunner	Pilot with Sun Glasses	Uncredited
1943	We've Never Been Licked	Brad Craig	Alternative title: Fighting Command
1946	The Cockeyed Miracle	Howard Bankson	Alternative title: The Return of Mr. Griggs
1948	Words and Music	Ben Feiner, Jr.	
1948	Leather Gloves	–	Director, producer
1948	Command Decision	Maj. George Rockton	
1949	The Clay Pigeon	Ted Niles	
1950	No Sad Songs for Me	Brownie	
1950	Rookie Fireman	Johnny Truitt	
1950	Foy Meets Girl	–	Director, short subject
1950	He's a Cockeyed Wonder	Actor in drive-in movie	Uncredited
1950	The Flying Missile	Amn. Hank Weber	Uncredited; Alternative title: The Flying Fish
1951	The Awful Sleuth	–	Director, short subject
1951	Woo-Woo Blues	–	Director, short subject
1951	The Sunny Side of the Street	–	Director
1951	Purple Heart Diary	–	Director
1952	Sound Off	–	Writer, director
1952	Castle in the Air	Opening Narrator/Radio Announcer	Writer, director Alternative title: Rainbow 'Round My Shoulder
1953	All Ashore	–	Writer, director
1953	Siren of Bagdad	–	Director
1953	Cruisin' Down the River	–	Director
1954	Drive a Crooked Road	–	Writer (adaptation), director
1954	Pushover	–	Director
1954	So This Is Paris	–	Director
1955	Bring Your Smile Along	–	Writer (story)
1955	My Sister Eileen	–	Writer, director
1956	He Laughed Last	–	Writer (story)
1956	The Solid Gold Cadillac	–	Director
1956	Full of Life	–	Director
1957	Operation Mad Ball	–	Director
1958	Bell, Book and Candle	–	Director
1959	It Happened to Jane	–	Director, producer
1960	Strangers When We Meet	–	Director
1960	The World of Suzie Wong	–	Director
1960	The Wackiest Ship in the Army	Narrator	
1962	The Notorious Landlady	–	Producer, director
1964	Paris When It Sizzles	–	Producer, director Alternative title: Together in Paris
1964	Sex and the Single Girl	–	Director
1965	How to Murder Your Wife	–	Director
1965	Synanon	–	Producer, director
1967	Hotel	–	Director
1967	Oh Dad, Poor Dad...	–	Director
1969	A Talent for Loving	–	Director; Alternative title: Gun Crazy
1970	The Moonshine War	–	Director
1974	W	–	Director; Alternative title: W is the Mark of Death
1979	The Prisoner of Zenda	–	Director
1980	The Fiendish Plot of Dr. Fu Manchu	–	Director (uncredited)

Television
Year	Title	Notes
1952–1954	The Ford Television Theatre	Director; 3 episodes
1953	General Electric Theater	Director; Episode: "Atomic Love"
1954	The Mickey Rooney Show	Creator; 20 episodes
1966	The Jean Arthur Show	Producer; 12 episodes
1972–1973	Columbo	Director "Dagger of the Mind" "Requiem for a Falling Star" "Double Exposure"
1973	Catch-22	Director; Television movie
1974	Hec Ramsey	Director; Episode: "Dead Heat"
1975	The Specialists	Director; Television movie
1975	McCoy	Director; 2 episodes
1978	Project U.F.O.	Director; Episode: "Sighting 4001: The Washington D.C. Incident"
