= Van Alexander =

American musician (1915–2015)

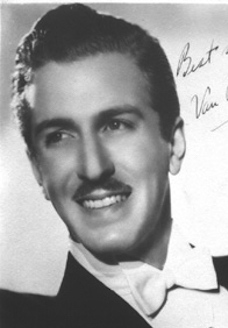

Background information
- Born: Alexander Van Vliet Feldman; May 2, 1915; New York City, New York, U.S.
- Died: July 19, 2015 (aged 100) Los Angeles, California, U.S.
- Occupations: Bandleader, composer, arranger
- Years active: 1930–1985

Van Alexander (May 2, 1915 – July 19, 2015) was an American bandleader, arranger, and composer.

== Early years ==
Van Alexander was born Alexander Van Vliet Feldman in Harlem. His mother was a classical pianist, and she taught him to play the piano. He studied music at Columbia University. Alexander led bands and arranged music beginning in high school.

== Career ==
He landed a job selling arrangements to Chick Webb in the middle of the 1930s. "A-Tisket, A-Tasket" became a hit for Webb and Ella Fitzgerald, becoming one of her signature tunes. Alexander arranged other nursery rhymes for jazz, such as "Where, Oh Where Has My Little Dog Gone?" and "Got a Pebble in My Shoe".

In 1938, Alexander formed his own band and played in theaters into the 1940s. When his group disbanded, he and two others from the group joined Larry Clinton's orchestra. George T. Simon, in his book, The Big Bands, quoted Clinton as saying that he had "a package deal from Van Alexander. He had given up his band and joined us, and he brought along Butch Stone and Irv Cottler, whose drumming made all the difference in the world." By June 1942, Alexander had formed another band of his own.

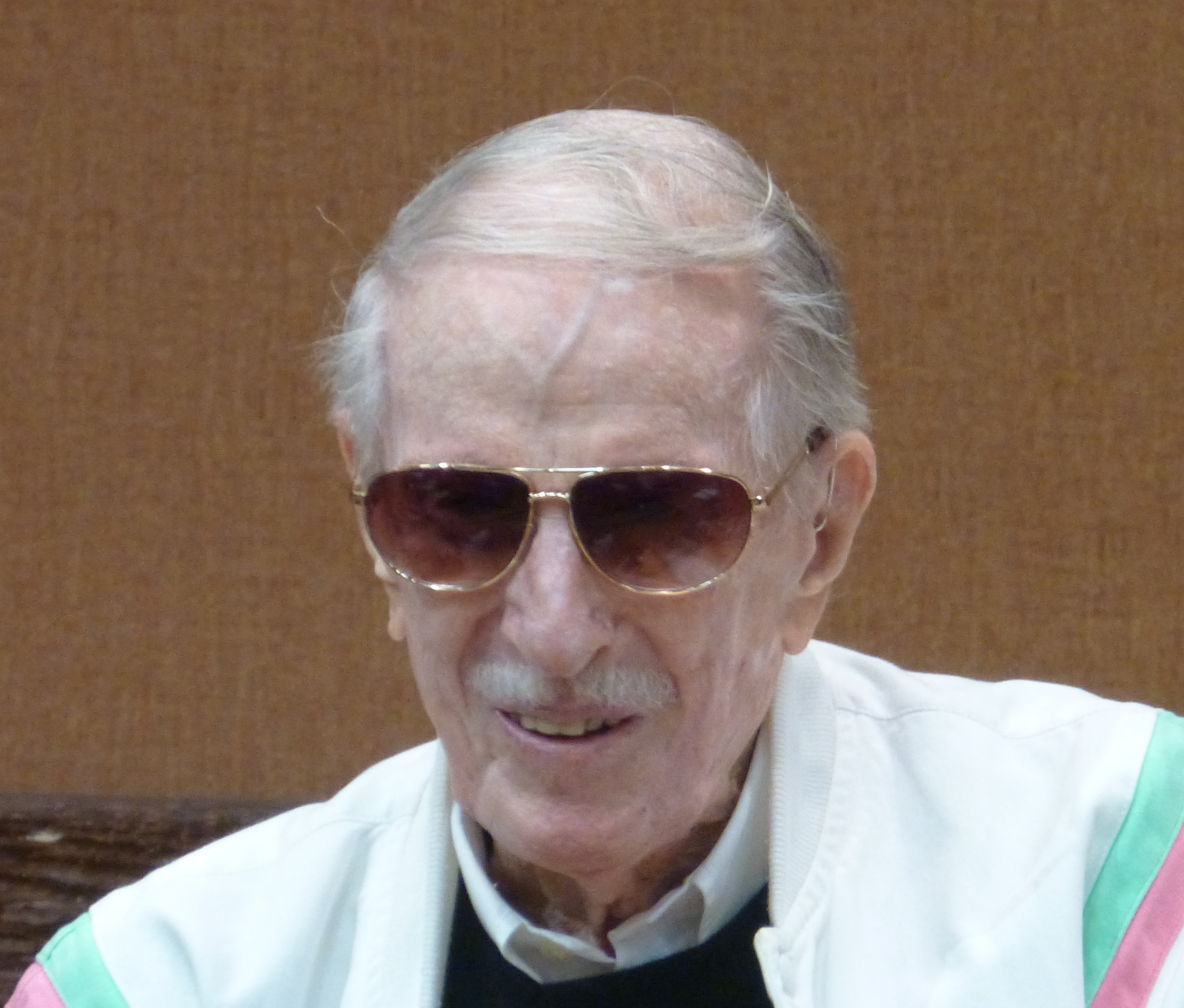
Van Alexander in 2013

Later in the 1940s, he was hired by Bob Crosby to work in Hollywood and worked extensively as a composer, arranger, and conductor for film scores. He wrote a textbook on film arrangement in 1950 called First Arrangement, and Johnny Mandel studied under him.

Alexander's scores included several Mickey Rooney films, such as The Atomic Kid (1954), The Twinkle in God's Eye (1955), Baby Face Nelson (1957), The Last Mile (1959), The Big Operator (1959) and The Private Lives of Adam and Eve (1960), as well as the scores to 13 Frightened Girls (1963), Strait-Jacket (1964), I Saw What You Did (1965) and Tarzan and the Valley of Gold (1966).

He provided music for the television shows Hazel, The Farmer's Daughter, Bewitched, I Dream of Jeannie, Dennis the Menace and The Wacky World of Jonathan Winters. He arranged and conducted for variety shows starring Dean Martin, Gordon MacRae, Mickey Rooney, and James Stewart. He was involved in recording sessions with Doris Day, Benny Goodman, Peggy Lee, Dinah Shore, Kay Starr, Dakota Staton, and Paul Whiteman.

Alexander turned 100 in May 2015. His wife, Beth, died in 2010.

He died of heart failure on July 19, 2015, in Los Angeles. He is buried in the Sanctuary of Meditation mausoleum, row 1, space 15a, in Hillside Memorial Park, Los Angeles, California.

== Awards and honors ==
Alexander was nominated twice for an Emmy Award for Outstanding Achievement in Music Direction of a Variety, Musical or Dramatic Program. His 1972 nomination was for his work on The Golddiggers Chevrolet Show, and his 1973 nomination was for his work on The Wacky World of Jonathan Winters. He received the Henry Mancini Award for lifetime achievement from ASCAP.
