= Operation Mad Ball =

1957 film by Richard Quine

- Theatrical release poster
- Directed by: Richard Quine
- Written by: Arthur Carter; Blake Edwards; Jed Harris
- Produced by: Jed Harris
- Starring: Jack Lemmon; Ernie Kovacs; Kathryn Grant; Arthur O'Connell; Mickey Rooney; Dick York; James Darren; Roger Smith; William Leslie
- Cinematography: Charles Lawton Jr.
- Edited by: Charles Nelson
- Music by: George Duning
- Distributed by: Columbia Pictures
- Release date: August 17, 1957
- Running time: 105 minutes
- Country: United States
- Language: English
- Box office: $1.85 million (US and Canadian rentals)

Operation Mad Ball is a 1957 American military comedy from Columbia Pictures, produced by Jed Harris, directed by Richard Quine, that stars Jack Lemmon, Ernie Kovacs, Kathryn Grant, Arthur O'Connell, and Mickey Rooney. The screenplay is by Blake Edwards, Jed Harris, and Arthur Carter, based on an unproduced play by Carter.

== Plot ==
Following World War II in 1945, at a U.S. Army hospital unit in France, Pvt. Hogan does not believe that a blue-stocking can ever be good-looking. Catching first sight of new arrival nurse Lt. Betty Bixby convinces him otherwise. He picks up her dropped cigarette lighter after putting aside his M-1 rifle. He is seen by security officer Capt. Paul Lock, who admonishes him for doing so while Hogan is standing night guard duty. Lock confines him to quarters preliminary to a court martial. Col. Rousch, who is in charge of the hospital, however, would prefer to keep everything "in the family" and avoid a court martial. He knows it would be bad for camp morale and discipline, their unit being close to being sent back to the U.S. for discharge from the service.

Hogan begins to organize a ball at an off-limits hotel before their unit disbands. This will be to benefit all the camp's nurse officers and his fellow enlisted soldiers (men being men and women being women), in spite of army regulations. Hogan temporarily appropriates one of x-ray officer (radiologist) Staff Sergeant Perkins' fluoroscopic images, one with an image of a duodenal ulcer. He brings it to Bixby's attention, unofficially; asking her to treat it surreptitiously, instead of ordering him to sick call, whom he wants to take to the ball. Bixby orders Hogan to report to her every two hours, to drink a cup of milk and cream (half and half), to prevent a perforated ulcer. Later, she discovers how Hogan falsified having an ulcer, then loses faith in him.

Hogan and Cpl. Bohun go through mishaps to make sure that the plan for the secret ball goes ahead. The plot oftens shows wheeling-and-dealing and complex maneuvering by Hogan and soon others of his fellow camp soldiers. As the various details surrounding the ball grow larger and ever more complex, their efforts evolve into a "Mad Ball" that no one will likely ever forget ... if Hogan and his men can carry it off. On their heels every minute, however, is Lock, always sniffing around and on the lookout for the slightest breach of what constitutes his ideas of strict army regulations and military discipline. Along the way, Hogan and his men jump through many hoops to distract Lock. Hogan finally sidelines Lock just before their blowout event happens.

The night of the ball, each soldier is paired with a nurse, except Hogan. He waits for Bixby, hoping that she has forgiven him, but he ends up disappointed, going to the ball without her. When he arrives at the hotel, he sees Bixby sitting with the camp's commanding officer Rousch, who has sworn to everyone at the ball to say nothing about what is going on that evening. When Bixby sees Hogan, she takes off her long military coat to reveal a pretty dress, and she shares a first dance with Hogan.

== Cast ==
- Jack Lemmon as Private Hogan
- Ernie Kovacs as Captain Paul Lock
- Kathryn Grant as Lieutenant Betty Bixby
- Arthur O'Connell as Colonel Rousch
- Mickey Rooney as Sergeant Yancy Skibo
- Dick York as Corporal Bohun
- James Darren as Private Widowskas
- Roger Smith as Corporal Berryman
- William Leslie as Private Grimes
- Sheridan Comerate as Sergeant Wilson
- L.Q. Jones as Ozark
- Jeanne Manet as Madame LaFour
- Bebe Allen as Lieutenant Johnson
- Dick Crockett as Sergeant McCloskey
- David McMahon as Sergeant Pringle
- William Hickey as Private Sampson
- William Pierson as Staff Sergeant Perkins
- Betsy Jones-Moreland as Lieutenant Bushey
- Stacy Graham as Lieutenant Rosedale
- Marilyn Hanold as Lieutenant Tweedy
- Mary Tyler Moore as Nurse (uncredited)

== Production ==
This film marks the first time that Jack Lemmon received top billing in a film, the first major screen role for Ernie Kovacs, and was also the first screen role for Mary Tyler Moore.

== Soundtrack ==
The title song "Mad Ball" was written by Fred Karger and Richard Quine. The opening credits are accompanied by the song being performed by Sammy Davis Jr. Richard Quine was also the director of the film, and some of the songs was contributed to by Davis Jr.

The title song was recorded on May 15, 1957, by Davis Jr. and released as a single by Decca Records - 930441, in the United States, in 1957, with the B side being "Cool Credo" and on Brunswick Records – 12118, with the B side being "The Birth of the Blues" in Germany, and in the United Kingdom – 05717, as the B side of "The Nearness of You". A LP was also released, titled Music for a Mad Ball by Tops Records, as L-1610 TOPS, with the cover notes containing a plot description and cast notes as well as photos of the cast, though the album does not contain music from the film itself.

== Awards and honors ==
- 1958 Golden Laurel Award - 2nd place - Top Male Comedy Performance - Jack Lemmon
- 1958 Writers Guild of America Awards - Nominated - Best Written American Comedy - Arthur Carter, Jed Harris and Blake Edwards

== See also ==
- List of American films of 1957
