= Sealed Cargo =

1951 film by Alfred L. Werker

- Directed by: Alfred L. Werker
- Screenplay by: Dale Van Every; Oliver H. P. Garrett; Roy Huggins
- Based on: The Gaunt Woman; 1943 novel by Edmund Gilligan
- Produced by: Warren Duff; Samuel Bischoff
- Starring: Dana Andrews; Carla Balenda; Claude Rains
- Cinematography: George E. Diskant
- Edited by: Ralph Dawson
- Music by: Roy Webb
- Production company: RKO Pictures
- Distributed by: RKO Pictures
- Release date: May 23, 1951 (New York)
- Running time: 87-90 minutes
- Country: United States
- Language: English

Sealed Cargo is a 1951 RKO Pictures American war film directed by Alfred L. Werker and starring Dana Andrews, Claude Rains, Carla Balenda and Philip Dorn. Andrews' younger brother Steve Forrest also appears in one of his earliest screen roles. The film is based on the novel The Gaunt Woman by Edmund Gilligan.

== Plot ==
In 1943 at the height of the World War II Battle of the Atlantic, Captain Pat Banyon of the fishing trawler Daniel Webster unloads his catch in his home port of Gloucester, Massachusetts. He reluctantly agrees to transport Margaret McLean to Trabo, a small community in Newfoundland. Shorthanded, he hires Danish sailor Konrad, and the Daniel Webster sails for the Grand Banks fishing grounds. Once at sea, another Dane named Holger reports that the radio has been sabotaged. Banyon suspects that Konrad, Holger or Margaret may be a German agent.

Sailing at night in heavy fog, they hear gunfire and search for survivors. They find the damaged Den Magre Kvinde (Danish for The Gaunt Woman), a Danish square-rigged sailing ship. She appears to have been damaged in a storm and then shelled. Aboard the ship, they discover only the dazed Captain Skalder and a dead body. Skalder claims that his crew abandoned ship in a storm and that he was subsequently attacked by a U-boat. The Daniel Webster tows the stricken Kvinde to Trabo.

Konrad is suspicious because he notes that the German gunfire hit the Kvinde above the waterline (rather than below it, where a gunner intending to sink a ship would aim), and that while the tarpaulin covering the ship's boat is riddled with bullet holes, the boat itself is undamaged. Banyon and Konrad sneak below decks to search the hold. When they meet, Konrad has a pistol, but he gives it to Banyon to prove his loyalty. They accidentally discover a second, hidden hold containing racks of torpedoes, indicating that the ship is a tender, covertly resupplying the U-boat "wolfpacks". The men watch undetected as Holger enters the hold and uses a radio to signal the Germans. However, before they can alert the military, Skalder's crew arrives in boats, so they pretend that they know nothing. Skalder plans to resupply the U-boats at Trabo.

A Canadian flying boat lands in the harbor and an officer inspects Skalder's papers. Finding nothing wrong, he informs Skalder that a corvette will arrive the next day to inspect his cargo. Banyon offers to leave one of his two Danish crewmen as a witness, allowing him to rid himself of the spy Holger without arousing suspicion.

Banyon leaves port, but once out of sight, one man remains aboard to sail to the nearest radio station, while Banyon and the rest take to the dories and return. Banyon plots a night ambush to stop the Germans who come to take the villagers prisoner. Banyon and his men then set fire to the Kvinde under cover of darkness. In the resulting confusion, they board, overpower or kill the remainder of the crew and free Margaret, who had been taken as a hostage.

Skalder claims to have set the ship to explode in 20 minutes. Banyon does not believe him but takes the ship out to sea, intending to destroy her safely away from the village. He and his men rig some torpedoes to explode. The Kvinde is approached by two U-boats seeking supplies. Skalder obtains a gun and wounds his guard Konrad before he is killed. As a third U-boat surfaces, Banyon and another man help Konrad into a boat and row away under German gunfire. When the ship explodes, the resulting wave swamps the submarines, sinking them.

== Cast ==
- Dana Andrews as Pat Banyon
- Carla Balenda as Margaret McLean
- Claude Rains as Captain Skalder
- Philip Dorn as Konrad
- Onslow Stevens as Commander James McLean
- Skip Homeier as Steve
- Eric Feldary as Holger
- J. M. Kerrigan as Skipper Ben
- Arthur Shields as Kevin Dolan
- Morgan Farley as Caleb

== Reception ==
In a contemporary review for The New York Times, critic A. H. Weiler wrote: "Although the foreword to 'Sealed Cargo' promises the unusual in pointing out that it is an illustration of 'great personal courage by little people' in World War II, the new arrival ... is somewhat less than heroic in scope. It is, in fact, an unassuming little melodrama ... which, apart from the suspense maintained throughout, follows an ancient pattern. At this point it is difficult to believe that Nazi sailors, trained as they were for desperate missions, would be prey for a handful of seagoing civilians. But Alfred Werker ... has made some of the unbelievable sequences taut and exciting."
