= Lucy Marlow =

American film and television actress (1932–2018)

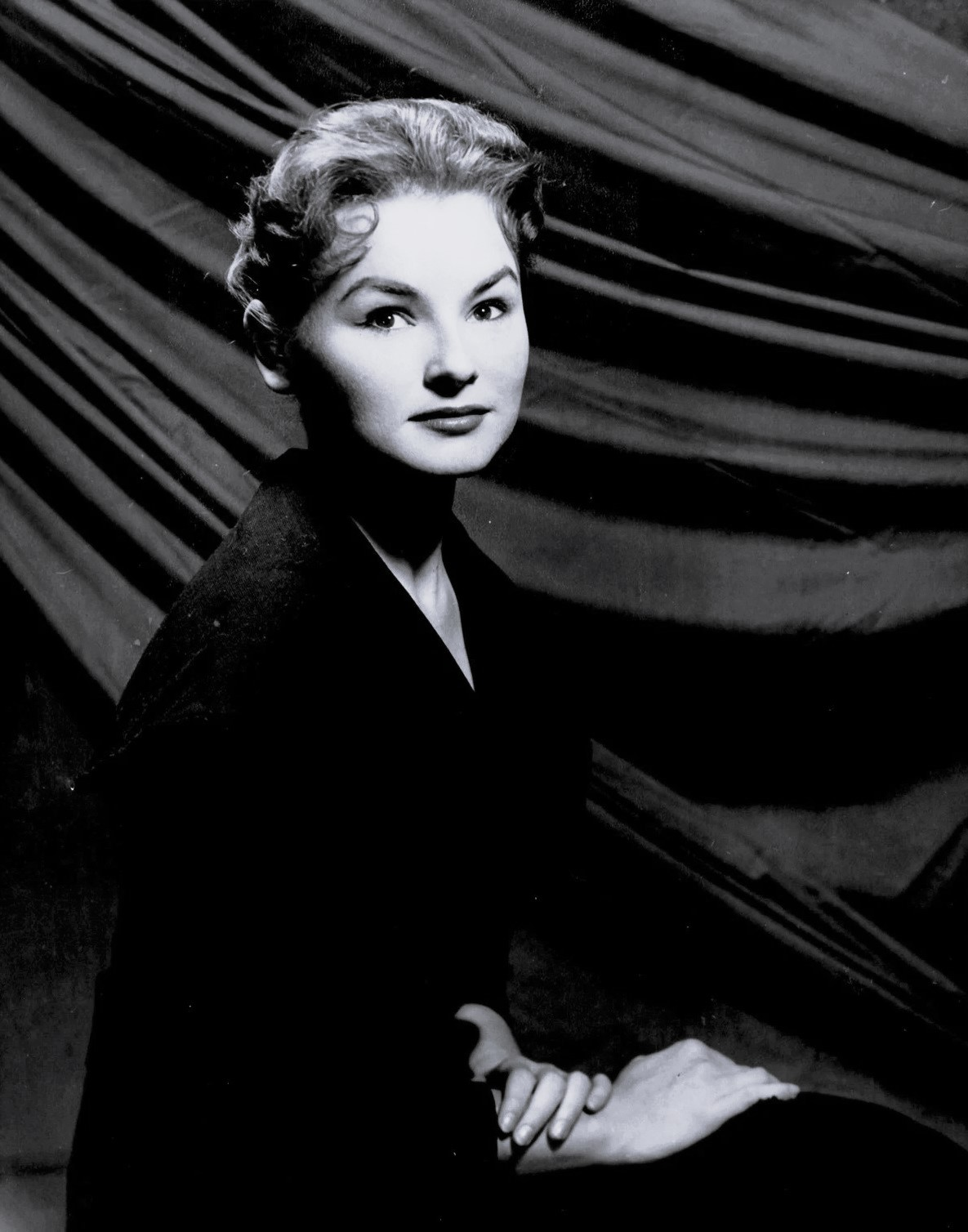
- Born: Lucy Ann McAleer; November 20, 1932; Los Angeles, California, U.S.
- Died: December 18, 2018 (aged 86); Beaumont, California, U.S.
- Occupations: Film and television actress
- Years active: 1954–1975
- Spouse: Andy Carey (m. 1955; div. 1974)
- Children: 2

Lucy Marlow (née Lucy Ann McAleer; November 20, 1932 – December 18, 2018) was an American film and television actress. She may be best known for playing the role of Helen in the 1955 film My Sister Eileen.

== Biography ==
Marlow was born in Los Angeles, California on November 20, 1932, as Lucy Ann McAleer. Prior to film, Marlow appeared in several productions at the Pasadena Playhouse, including a show named a comedy named Lo and Behold and a production named Gown and Glory. Marlow was given a screentest after she was scouted after appearing in the latter production. She later appeared as the titular character in a production of Jane Eyre at the Ricardo Montalbán Theatre.

Marlow began her screen career in 1954, playing the role of a party guest in the film Lucky Me. She then appeared in the 1954 film A Star Is Born.

In 1955, Marlow co-starred as Marge Stevenson in the film Bring Your Smile Along. That same year, she appeared in several other films, including My Sister Eileen and Queen Bee. Her final film credit was a starring role in the 1956 film He Laughed Last. Marlow also guest-starred in television programs including Gunsmoke (in 1959 as “Lucy Marlowe” in S4E32's “Change of Heart”), Shotgun Slade, Peter Gunn, Overland Trail and Tales of Wells Fargo.

== Personal life and death ==
Marlow was born on November 20, 1932, to James C. McAleer and Celeste Edna Rothe McAleer. Her father was a hardware man and real estate dealer. Her uncle is Owen McAleer, who served as mayor of Los Angeles from 1908 to 1912. Another uncle, Jimmy McAleer, was manager of the St. Louis Browns.

Marlow graduated from Los Angeles High School, where she was active in the theatre program. She starred in multiple productions while there, including Peg o' My Heart and Gramercy Ghost.She later studied drama at the University of Arizona. While in university she was active in the theatre program and the school band. While studying she was also a member of the Kappa Alpha Theta sorority.

Marlow married professional baseball third baseman Andy Carey They were married at the Hollywood United Methodist Church on October 6, 1955. In 1956, she gave birth to their son. She later gave birth to a daughter. The marriage ended in divorce in 1974, and their son James died in a car crash in 1980 at the age of 23.

Marlow died in Beaumont, California on December 18, 2018, at the age of 86.
