= The Troubles in Belleek =

Series of fatal conflicts in Belleek, Northern Ireland

The Troubles in Belleek recounts incidents during, and the effects of the Troubles in Belleek, County Fermanagh, Northern Ireland.

Incidents in Belleek during the Troubles resulting in one or more fatalities:

== 1972 ==
- 28 November 1972 - Robert Keys (55), a member of the Royal Ulster Constabulary (RUC), was killed in a rocket attack on Belleek police and army barracks by the Provisional Irish Republican Army. The attack was a well planned operation carried out on the morning when the guard force changed locations. 50% of Assault troop A Sqn 16/5L had left Belleek and 50% of the relieving force had left Omagh. The first contact was a RPG 7 round entering the police station thro the armoured shutter covering the stair window. Robert Keys had a small cupboard on the stairs from which he sold cigarettes, sweets, matches etc. The RPG warhead came through the shutter hit Robert in the chest and went through a wall before stopping. Robert died within a short time. The remaining troops stood to and returned fire. An estimated 6-9 gunmen took part in the attack with the firefight lasting 15 min.

== 1977 ==
- 5 April 1977 - Sean Prendergast (22), a member of the British Army (9th/12th Royal Lancers), was killed, in a Provisional Irish Republican Army landmine attack, on an Army armoured car, near Belleek.

== 1982 ==
- 30 April 1982 - Colin Clifford (21), a member of the British Army (1st bn, The Royal Hampshire Regiment), was killed in a Provisional Irish Republican Army landmine attack, on foot patrol, near Belleek.

== 1987 ==
- 19 July 1987 - Thomas Hewitt (21), a member of the British Army (Royal Green Jackets), was shot by a Provisional Irish Republican Army sniper, while on foot patrol.

== 1988 ==
- 18 March 1988 - Gillian Johnston (21), a Protestant civilian, was shot and killed by the Provisional Irish Republican Army while sitting in a car outside her home.
- 4 August 1988 - William Hassard (59) and Frederick Love (64), both Protestant civilians, were shot and killed by the Provisional Irish Republican Army shortly after driving out of Belleek police and army barracks. Both were contractors to the Army and police.
- 4 October 1988 - RTE interviews in the village.

== 1992 ==
- 5 February 1992, Joseph MacManus, a member of the Provisional Irish Republican Army from Sligo Town, County Sligo, Republic of Ireland, was killed in an assassination attempt on a UDR soldier.
