= Full of Life =

1956 film by Richard Quine

- Theatrical release poster
- Directed by: Richard Quine
- Screenplay by: John Fante
- Based on: Full of Life; 1952 novel by John Fante
- Produced by: Fred Kohlmar
- Starring: Judy Holliday; Richard Conte; Salvatore Baccaloni
- Cinematography: Charles Lawton Jr.
- Edited by: Charles Nelson
- Music by: George Duning
- Production company: Columbia Pictures
- Distributed by: Columbia Pictures
- Release dates: December 25, 1956 (Los Angeles); February 1, 1957 (New York City)
- Running time: 91 minutes
- Country: United States
- Language: English
- Box office: $1.3 million (US rentals)

Full of Life is a 1956 American comedy-drama film directed by Richard Quine and starring Judy Holliday and Richard Conte. It was nominated for an award by the Writers Guild of America in 1957.

== Plot ==
Writer Nick and his wife Emily are expecting their first child. When a necessary home repair proves too costly to afford, Nick must swallow his pride and visit his father, a proud immigrant stonemason with whom he has a difficult relationship, and ask him to do the work. Confronting the issues of religion and family tradition which have separated father and son causes Nick and Emily to reevaluate their lives and the things they value most.

== Cast ==
- Judy Holliday as Emily Rocco
- Richard Conte as Nick Rocco
- Salvatore Baccaloni as Papa Victorio Rocco
- Esther Minciotti as Mama Coletta Rocco
- Joe De Santis as Father Gondolfo
- Silvio Minciotti as Joe Muto
- Penny Santon as Carla Rocco
- Arthur Lovejoy as Mr. Jameson
- Eleanor Audley as Mrs. Jameson
- Trudy Marshall as Nora Gregory
- Walter Conrad as John Gregory
- Sam Gilman as Dr. Atchison

== See also ==
- List of American films of 1956
