= He Laughed Last =

1956 film by Blake Edwards

- Directed by: Blake Edwards
- Written by: Blake Edwards; Richard Quine
- Produced by: Jonie Taps
- Starring: Frankie Laine; Lucy Marlow; Anthony Dexter; Dick Long; Alan Reed; Jesse White
- Cinematography: Henry Freulich
- Edited by: Jack Ogilvie
- Music by: Arthur Morton
- Production company: Columbia Pictures
- Distributed by: Columbia Pictures
- Release date: August 12, 1956
- Running time: 77 minutes
- Country: United States
- Language: English

He Laughed Last is a 1956 American Technicolor comedy film by Blake Edwards. Edwards adapted the film for his 1999 Off-Broadway show, Big Rosemary starring Cady Huffman as Rosemary "Rosie" Lebeau, the role played by Lucy Marlow in this film.

== Plot ==
The film is a Runyonesque Roaring 20s musical comedy about show girl Rosemary "Rosie" Lebeau, who circumstance casts as an unlikely mob boss.

== Cast ==
- Frankie Laine as Gino Lupo
- Lucy Marlow as Rosemary "Rosie" Lebeau
- Anthony Dexter as Dominic Rodríguez
- Richard Long as Jimmy Murphy
- Alan Reed as Big Dan Hennessy
- Jesse White as Max Lassiter
- Florenz Ames as George Eagle
- Henry Slate as Ziggy

== See also ==
- List of American films of 1956
