= Cruisin' Down the River =

1953 film by Richard Quine

- Theatrical release poster
- Directed by: Richard Quine
- Written by: Blake Edwards; Richard Quine
- Produced by: Jonie Taps
- Starring: Dick Haymes; Audrey Totter; Billy Daniels; Cecil Kellaway; Connie Russell; The Bell Sisters
- Cinematography: Charles Lawton Jr.
- Edited by: Jerome Thoms
- Music by: George Duning
- Color process: Technicolor
- Distributed by: Columbia Pictures Corporation
- Release date: August 3, 1953
- Running time: 79 min.
- Country: United States
- Language: English

Cruisin' Down the River is a 1953 American Technicolor musical film directed by Richard Quine. It stars Dick Haymes and Audrey Totter. The story is about New York nightclub singer Beau Clemment II who inherits an old riverboat on the Chattahoochee River between Georgia and Alabama.

== Plot summary ==
Beau Clemment II, a singer in New York City, learns that he has inherited a riverboat once owned by his grandfather, Beauregard, who had won it from its captain, Thadeus Jackson, in a game of chance. Thadeus has been bitter ever since, his old acquaintance Humphrey Hepburn recalling how Beauregard also won the heart of the vessel's star performer, Melissa Curry.

Beau travels to Alabama to claim the boat, which he finds in something far less than ship-shape condition. Unsure whether to scrap it or sell what's left of it, Beau meets singer Sally Jane Jackson, granddaughter of Thadeus, and they develop a mutual attraction. He elects to restore the vessel and launch it with entertainment and gambling. He even recruits Thadeus's singing butler, William, to perform aboard ship.

Thadeus objects to Beau's ownership and presence, doing everything in his power to scuttle the venture. By the time the law catches up to it, Beau's boat has sailed into Georgia, out of its jurisdiction. Thadeus, finally accepting the situation, is given a 50-50 interest in the boat with Beau, who is about to wed Sally Jane and become a part of the family.

== Cast ==
- Dick Haymes as Beauregard Clemment / Beau Clemment II
- Audrey Totter as Sally Jane Jackson
- Billy Daniels as William
- Cecil Kellaway as Thadeus Jackson
  - Johnny Downs as Young Thadeus Jackson
- Connie Russell as Melissa Curry
- Douglas Fowley as Humphrey Hepburn
- Larry J. Blake as Dave Singer
- Benny Payne as Benny
- The Bell Sisters as Singers
