= My Sister Eileen (disambiguation) =

My Sister Eileen is a series of short stories by Ruth McKenney published in book form in 1938.

My Sister Eileen may also refer to:

- My Sister Eileen (play), a 1940 comedic stage play based on the short stories
- My Sister Eileen (1942 film), a 1942 film based on the play
- My Sister Eileen (1955 film), a 1955 musical comedy film based on the play
- My Sister Eileen (TV series), a 1960–1961 television series based on the short stories, play, and films
