= Eileen Bransten =

American judge (1942–2022)

Justice, New York Supreme Court, Manhattan
- In office 1996–2018

Judge, New York City Civil Court
- In office 1994–1999

Personal details
- Born: December 11, 1942
- Died: April 26, 2022 (aged 79) New York, New York
- Parent(s): Ruth McKenney, Richard Bransten
- Education: Hunter College (summa cum laude 1975); Fordham School of Law (1979)

Eileen Bransten (December 11, 1942 – April 26, 2022) was an American judge who served in New York's state courts for nearly 25 years, including from 2008 to 2018 in Manhattan's Commercial Division, its specialized business court. She was the daughter of author Ruth McKenney and writer and editor Richard Bransten. Bransten was a founder of Fordham Law School's Institute on Complex Commercial Litigation, which was renamed the Eileen Bransten Institute on Complex Commercial Litigation in 2023. She oversaw numerous important business and commercial cases during her tenure with the Commercial Division. She held a number of judicial leadership positions, and mentored young lawyers who went on to become judges themselves.

== Early life and education ==
Bransten was the daughter of author Ruth McKenney and writer and editor Richard Bransten, and the niece of Eileen McKenney, an executive assistant to Walt Disney and wife of Nathanael West. Bransten was born on December 11, 1942, two years after her aunt and West died in an automobile accident in California. McKenney actively discouraged Bransten from attending college, believing that Bransten could learn all she needed to know by reading books. Bransten ultimately attended Hunter College at age 28, graduating summa cum laude in 1975, and received her law degree from Fordham University Law School in 1979.

Bransten had a wide range of experience before attending college, often involving politics. From 1965 to 1969, she directed research for political campaigns, and in 1967 served as a senior research analyst for the Style and Arrangement Committee of the New York State Constitutional Convention. From 1970 to 1973, she was director of research and public relations for the New York State Senate Minority and also did research and writing for the Criminal Justice Coordinating Council of the New York City Mayor's Office. In 1967 and 1968 she was also a correspondent for the New York Law Journal.

== Legal career ==
From 1979 to 1984, Bransten served in the Queens County District Attorney’s Office, and after that was in the private practice of law as a solo practitioner for seven years. In 1992, she became the Principal Court Attorney and Law Secretary to Supreme Court Justice Jacqueline W. Silbermann, who was also Administrative Judge of the Civil Court of the City of New York (the New York City Civil Court).

== Judicial Service ==
In 1993, Bransten was elected to the New York City Civil Court, and began serving in 1994. She was appointed an acting trial level New York State Supreme Court justice in 1996, where she presided over a General Trial and then a Matrimonial Part. In November 1999, Bransten was elected to the New York Supreme Court in Manhattan. She spent seven years presiding over a Medical Malpractice Part within the Supreme Court, from 2001 until 2008. In March 2008, Bransten was assigned to the Commercial Division, and served there until her retirement in 2018.

Hundreds of Bransten's written legal opinions as a judge have been published. Some of the notable cases over which Bransten presided include: the child custody dispute involving Revlon billionaire Ronald O. Perelman; fraud claims against Countrywide Financial and Bank of America arising out of the mortgage backed securities crisis of the mid-2000s; challenges to largest ever (at the time) arbitration awards involving securities futures; a lawsuit involving Hexion Specialty Chemicals financing of its takeover bid for the Huntsman Corporation; a dispute over the application of a New York State sales tax law on Amazon; a suit by professional golfer Vijay Singh against the PGA Tour; an investor suit against Outcome Health and its principals Rishi Shah and Shradha Agarwal; litigation over the restructuring of paper maker Norske Skogindustrier ASA; and a suit by Norex Petroleum Ltd. against Leonard Blavatnik and Victor Vekselberg over control of a Siberian oil field.

In 2018, Bransten read aloud her 40-page legal opinion, in a case involving art looted by the Nazis, saying, among other things: "'New York is not and shall not become a safe harbour for [art pillaged] during Nazi genocide....'"

In 2014, Bransten was a founder of Fordham Law School's Institute on Complex Commercial Litigation, which was designed to train Commercial Division and appellate judges on issues related to commercial litigation. Fordham has described Bransten as the institute's "leader and greatest supporter". In 2023, Fordham Law School renamed the institute, the Eileen Bransten Institute on Complex Commercial Litigation. New York Supreme Court Appellate Division justice (and former Commercial Division justice) Saliann Scarpulla once served as Bransten's principal court attorney, and New York Commercial Division justice Jennifer G. Schechter once served as Bransten's law clerk.

== Positions and honors ==
Bransten held the following positions or received the following honors, among others;

- Fordham Law School renamed its Institute on Complex Commercial Litigation, the Eileen Bransten Institute on Complex Commercial Litigation (2023)
- New York Chief Judge Jonathan Lippman appointed Bransten to serve on the Commercial Division Advisory Council (2013)
- President of the Association of the Supreme Court Justices of the State of New York (2012)
- Co-president of Judges and Lawyers Breast Cancer Alert (2006 to 2008), and member of its Board of Directors
- Presiding Member of the New York State Bar Association's Judicial Section (2008)
- Inducted into the Hunter College Alumni Hall of Fame (2000)
- Member of the New York City Bar Association’s Council on Judicial Administration
- Officer of the New York State Supreme Court Board of Justices
- Member, Board of Directors of Fordham University Law School

== Personal life and death ==
Bransten's mother and Aunt Eileen were the subjects of her mother's short stories, collected in the bestselling book My Sister Eileen; which went on to be the source of two Broadway plays (My Sister Eileen and Wonderful Town) and a motion picture (My Sister Eileen). Her paternal grandfather owned MJB Coffee, but her father (also a writer) and mother became members of the Communist Party until their ouster in 1946; her father being the more political of her parents. Her father committed suicide on her mother's 44th birthday in 1955, when Bransten was one month away from her 13th birthday; and Ruth McKenney ceased writing after that.

Bransten lived with her mother in Manhattan during the years before her mother's death in 1972. Bransten married John Simpson, who had two sons from a prior marriage. She died on April 26, 2022.
