= My Sister Eileen (1955 film) =

1955 film by Richard Quine

- Theatrical release poster
- Directed by: Richard Quine
- Screenplay by: Blake Edwards; Richard Quine
- Based on: My Sister Eileen by Joseph Fields; Jerome Chodorov
- Produced by: Fred Kohlmar
- Starring: Janet Leigh; Jack Lemmon; Betty Garrett; Robert Fosse; Kurt Kasznar; Richard York; Lucy Marlow
- Cinematography: Charles Lawton Jr.
- Edited by: Charles Nelson
- Music by: George Duning
- Production company: Columbia Pictures
- Distributed by: Columbia Pictures
- Release date: September 22, 1955
- Running time: 108 minutes
- Country: United States
- Language: English
- Box office: $1.8 million (US)

My Sister Eileen is a 1955 American musical comedy film directed by Richard Quine and starring Janet Leigh, Jack Lemmon, and Betty Garrett.

The screenplay by Quine and Blake Edwards is based on the 1940 play by Joseph Fields and Jerome Chodorov, which was inspired by a series of autobiographical short stories by Ruth McKenney originally published in The New Yorker. The play originally was filmed in 1942. (This musical film is totally different from the 1953 Broadway musical Wonderful Town, though both are based on the original Ruth McKenney source material.)

== Plot ==
Witty Ruth and pretty Eileen Sherwood, sisters from Columbus, Ohio, relocate to New York City and settle in a rundown basement studio apartment in a Greenwich Village building owned by Papa Appopoulos. Ruth aspires to be a writer, while Eileen hopes to achieve success as an actress. They become acquainted with their neighbor Ted Loomis, an athlete who lives with his fiancée Helen Wade.

Ruth has a letter of introduction to Bob Baker, editor-in-chief of Manhatter magazine. As he rushes off for vacation, he counsels her to write about things she knows rather than the artificial stories she had sent him. Meanwhile, after finding herself the target of unwanted advances from a theatre producer, Eileen goes to the local Walgreens for lunch. Soda fountain manager Frank Lippincott lends her a sympathetic ear and offers his assistance, assuring her many theatrical people eat at the counter.

As time progresses, Ruth collects a lot of rejection slips and Eileen fails to secure any auditions. When newspaper reporter Chick Clark overhears Frank telling Eileen about an audition, he claims to know the show's producer and assures her he can get her an interview with him. Upon arrival at the theater, they discover it is a burlesque house where striptease is the main attraction. Mortified, Eileen rushes out.

Bob returns from vacation and meets with Ruth to tell her his favorite of her stories is about Eileen and her romantic misadventures. Ruth claims her sister is simply a product of her imagination and the experiences she described actually are her own. Intrigued, Bob asks her for a date, but Ruth declines, and later tells Eileen she finds him dull and unattractive.

Ted asks the girls if he can stay with them while Helen's mother Mrs. Wade visits and Eileen agrees despite Ruth's uncertainty. Eileen invites Chick and Frank to dinner, but when her spaghetti sauce is ruined by a plumber, Chick suggests they go to El Morocco, where he tells Eileen he will introduce Ruth to his editor, and Ruth sees Bob with a glamorous woman.

Bob's secretary is certain Ruth's stories are not as autobiographical as she claims. He invites her to dinner to discuss the publication of a story, and when he tries to kiss her she runs off, suggesting she may be less experienced than her stories suggest. Eileen tells Frank unless Ruth's story is published, the impoverished sisters will have to return to Ohio. Frank is in love with her but, mistakenly thinking Ted lives with the girls, accuses Eileen of being a bohemian and departs.

The following day, Ruth receives a phone call asking her to cover the arrival of the Brazilian Navy for the local paper. Unaware it was Chick, who made the call in order to ensure being alone with Eileen, she rushes off. Chick comes to the apartment, and is thrown out by Ted when Eileen needs help fending off the reporter's advances. Helen sees Ted comforting Eileen, and mistakenly assumes the worst.

Ruth is pursued by the Brazilian naval cadets, who have misunderstood her intent in meeting their ship. In order to calm them down, Ruth and Eileen initiate a Conga line, which rapidly evolves into a wild dance party in the street that draws the attention of the police, and everyone is arrested. The Brazilian Consul intervenes on their behalf, and the girls return home to pack their belongings. Bob arrives at the apartment, professes his love for Ruth, and tells her he is publishing her stories. Frank arrives with a box of chocolates for Eileen, Ted and Helen reconcile, and the sisters decide to remain in New York.

== Cast ==
- Janet Leigh as Eileen Sherwood
- Jack Lemmon as Robert "Bob" Baker
- Betty Garrett as Ruth Sherwood
- Bob Fosse (credited as Robert Fosse) as Frank Lippincott
- Kurt Kasznar as Papa Appopoulos
- Dick York (credited as Richard York) as Ted Loomis
- Lucy Marlow as Helen Wade
- Tommy Rall as Chick Clark
- Barbara Brown as Mrs. Wade
- Horace McMahon as Officer Lonigan
- Henry Slate as drunk
- Hal March as Pete

Uncredited

- Adelle August as secretary
- Spencer Chan as pedestrian
- Ken Christy as Sergeant Charlie
- Richard Deacon as Baker's receptionist
- Franklyn Farnum as pedestrian
- Michael Fox as actor
- Kathryn Grant as young hopeful
- Edna Holland as matron
- Alphonse Martell as waiter
- Mara McAfee as Miss Stewart
- Albert Morin as Brazilian consul
- William Newell as plumber
- Frank O'Connor as Mr. O'Connor
- Emil Sitka as Welder
- Queenie Smith as Alice
- Sid Tomack as counterman

== Production ==
In 1953, Joseph Fields and Jerome Chodorov adapted their 1940 play for Wonderful Town, with lyrics by Betty Comden and Adolph Green and music by Leonard Bernstein. Its success on Broadway prompted Harry Cohn, head of Columbia Pictures, which had released the 1942 screen adaptation of the play, to seek the film rights to the musical. When they proved to be too costly, he decided to hire Jule Styne and Leo Robin to write a different score. Because the film couldn't bear any resemblance to Wonderful Town, a studio attorney was assigned to make sure there were no similarities between the two. Even the musical numbers had to be positioned at different places in the storyline.

Screenwriter/director Richard Quine, who had portrayed Frank Lippincott in the 1940 stage play and the 1942 screen adaptation, originally cast Judy Holliday in the role of Ruth Sherwood. When the actress got into a contract dispute with the studio, she was replaced by Betty Garrett, who had been essentially, but not officially, blacklisted due to her marriage to Larry Parks, a one-time member of the Communist Party, who had been forced to testify before the House Un-American Activities Committee. As a result, this was Garrett's first screen appearance since On the Town six years earlier. The musical sequences were choreographed by Bob Fosse, who played Frank Lippincott in the film. A little over a year after the film's release, Garrett and Parks replaced Judy Holliday and Sydney Chaplin, respectively, on Broadway for a month in the smash hit Comden-Green-Styne musical Bells Are Ringing.

Aldo Ray turned down his part of Ted Loomis as being too small and it was given to Dick York, a Columbia contract star.

== Song list ==
Atmosphere — Chorus

As Soon As They See Eileen — Performed by Betty Garrett

I'm Great — Performed by Betty Garrett, Janet Leigh, Kurt Kasznar and Dick York

There's Nothin' Like Love — Performed by Bob Fosse and Janet Leigh

It's Bigger Than You and Me — Performed by Jack Lemmon

Give Me a Band and My Baby — Performed by Betty Garrett, Janet Leigh, Bob Fosse and Tommy Rall

Conga — Performed by Betty Garrett, Janet Leigh, Kurt Kaszner and the Brazilian Navy

== Critical reception ==
Bosley Crowther of The New York Times observed, "Happily let it be stated that Miss Garrett and Miss Leigh are okay. In fact Miss Garrett is okay in shining letters . . . [She] has the proper skepticism and the right desperation for the role. Her way with a line is homicidal. What's more, she can dance and sing. These are essential talents in this production, in which Miss Leigh . . . is particularly nimble on her legs — and for which Mr. Styne and Mr. Robin have dished up some apt and lively songs . . . But it is Jack Lemmon . . . who generates the most amusement and upholds the tarnished dignity of males. Mr. Lemmon is a charming comedy actor, getting more so in each successive film. And his off-hand maneuvering around Miss Garrett to shatter her resistance is grand. When the two, in a scene of mad seduction, sing "It's Bigger Than You and Me," the breadth of the spoof is established and the high point of the comedy is reached."

In his review of the DVD release of the film, Steve Daly of Entertainment Weekly graded it B. He thought "some Bob Fosse choreography and Jule Styne–Leo Robin songs wittily capture the Village esprit" but felt the subplot involving Lemmon was "alarmingly chauvinistic." Comparing this version to the 1942 original, he said it "seems a testament to '50s feminist backlash."

== Home media ==
Sony Pictures Home Entertainment released the film on Region 1 DVD on February 22, 2005. It is in anamorphic widescreen format with audio tracks in English and Portuguese and subtitles in Japanese. Twilight Time released the film on blu-ray on June 19, 2018.

== See also ==
- List of American films of 1955
