= Sally Benson =

American author of short stories and screenwriter (1897–1972)

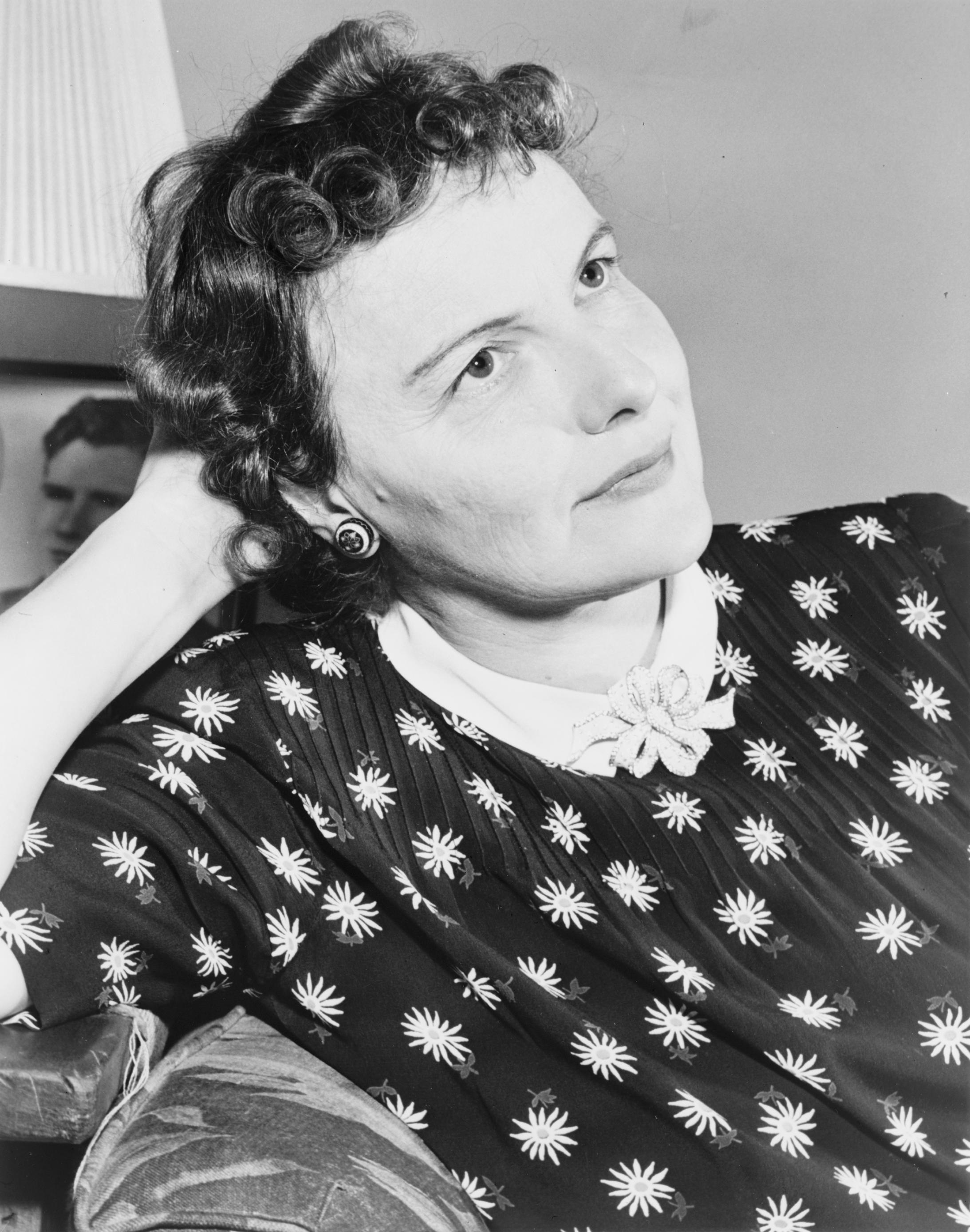
- Sally Benson, 1941
- Born: September 3, 1897; St. Louis, Missouri, U.S.
- Died: July 19, 1972 (aged 74); Woodland Hills, California, U.S.
- Occupations: Screenwriter, author
- Writing career
- Genres: Fiction, screenwriting

Sally Benson (née Sara Smith; September 3, 1897 – July 19, 1972) was an American writer of short stories, screenplays, and theatre. She is best known for her humorous tales of modern youth collected in Junior Miss and her semi-autobiographical stories collected in Meet Me in St. Louis.

== Early life and career ==
Benson was born in St. Louis, the youngest of five children of Alonzo Redway and Anna Prophater Smith. She attended the Mary Institute until she moved with her family to New York. She attended the Horace Mann School, studied dance and then started working when she was 17 years old. At age 19, she married Reynolds "Babe" Benson. The couple had a daughter, Barbara Benson, and later divorced.

She began her career writing weekly interview articles and film reviews for the New York Morning Telegraph. Between 1929 and 1941, she published 99 stories in The New Yorker, including nine signed with her pseudonym Esther Evarts.

Her stories "The Overcoat" and "Suite 2049" were selected as O. Henry prize stories for 1935 and 1936. Her collection, People are Fascinating (Covici Friede, 1936) includes almost all the stories Benson had then published in The New Yorker, plus four from American Mercury. She followed with another collection, Emily (Covici Friede, 1938). Stories of the Gods and Heroes (Dial Press, 1940) was juvenile fiction adapted from Thomas Bulfinch's Age of Fable. Women and Children First was a collection published by Random House in 1943.

== Junior Miss ==
Junior Miss, a collection of short stories focused on a young teen named Judy Graves and originally appearing in The New Yorker, was published by Random House in 1941. Benson's collection was adapted by Jerome Chodorov and Joseph Fields into a successful play that same year. Directed by Moss Hart, Junior Miss ran on Broadway from 1941 to 1943. In 1945, the play was adapted as the film Junior Miss with George Seaton directing Peggy Ann Garner in the lead role. The Junior Miss radio series, which originally featured Shirley Temple but later starred Barbara Whiting, was broadcast on CBS in the 1940s and early ‘50s.

== Meet Me in St. Louis ==
MGM's Meet Me in St. Louis (1944) was one of the more popular movies made during World War II. The stories in Sally Benson's book Meet Me in St. Louis were first written as short vignettes in a series titled 5135 Kensington, which The New Yorker published from June 14, 1941, to May 23, 1942. Benson took her original eight vignettes and added four more stories for a book compilation with each chapter representing a month of a year (from 1903 to 1904). When the book was published by Random House as Meet Me in St. Louis in 1942, it was titled after the MGM film, then in the very early stages of scripting. At MGM, Benson wrote an early draft of the screenplay, but it was not used.

== Short story collections ==
- People Are Fascinating (1936, Covici-Friede Publishers)
- Emily (1938, Covici-Friede Publishers), published in England as Love Thy Neighbour (1939)
- Stories of the Gods and Heroes (1940, Dial)
- Junior Miss (1941, Random House)
- Meet Me in St. Louis (1942, Random House)
- Women and Children First (1943, Random House)

== Theater work ==
Benson co-wrote the book for the musical Memphis Bound (1945), which was based on Gilbert and Sullivan's H.M.S. Pinafore. She also wrote the book for the musical adaptation of Booth Tarkington's Seventeen (1951). Her final theater writing was for The Young and the Beautiful (1955), a comedy based on stories by F. Scott Fitzgerald.

== Film and television writing ==
- Shadow of a Doubt (1943)
- Meet Me in St. Louis (1944)
- Anna and the King of Siam (1946)
- Come to the Stable (1949)
- Conspirator (1949)
- No Man of Her Own (1950)
- Curtain Call (1952, TV series)
- The Farmer Takes a Wife (1953)
- Hans Brinker and the Silver Skates (1958, TV movie)
- Bus Stop (1961, TV series)
- Summer Magic (1963)
- Viva Las Vegas (1964)
- Signpost to Murder (1964)
- Joy in the Morning (1965)
- The Singing Nun (1966)
