= Junior Miss (film) =

1945 film by George Seaton

- Film poster
- Directed by: George Seaton
- Written by: Sally Benson (novel); Joseph Fields (play); Jerome Chodorov (play); George Seaton
- Produced by: William Perlberg
- Starring: Peggy Ann Garner; Allyn Joslyn
- Cinematography: Charles G. Clarke
- Edited by: Robert Simpson
- Music by: David Buttolph
- Distributed by: 20th Century Fox
- Release date: June 16, 1945
- Running time: 94 minutes
- Country: United States
- Language: English
- Box office: $1,750,000

Junior Miss is a 1945 American comedy film starring Peggy Ann Garner as a teenager who meddles in people's love lives.

A collection of Sally Benson's stories from The New Yorker was published by Random House as Junior Miss in 1941. The stories were adapted by Jerome Chodorov and Joseph Fields into a successful play that same year. Directed by Moss Hart, Junior Miss ran on Broadway from 1941 to 1943. In 1945, the play was adapted to the film Junior Miss with George Seaton directing Peggy Ann Garner in the lead role of Judy Graves.

Junior Miss was adapted as a radio series three times in the late 1940s and early ‘50s, first with Shirley Temple and later with Barbara Whiting performing the lead role.

== Plot ==
Lively and imaginative sisters Judy and Lois Graves, 13 and 16 years old, live in an apartment in New York City with their forgiving and patient mother Grace and father, Harry, a lawyer. Judy's equally energetic friend Fuffy Adams frequently visits, and the two girls have their own ideas about the relations of the adults surrounding them. They often use film plots to interpret the reality around them.

One night right before Christmas, Judy learns that her mother has a brother, Uncle Willis, who has been absent for years. She is intrigued by the news and fantasizes a story about the handsome man in which jail time becomes a reason for the absence. In reality, Uncle Willis is a recovering alcoholic who has spent the last four years struggling in rehab. Later that night, Judy meets Fuffy, who brings a handsome boy named Haskell Cummings. The young boy's appearance distracts her from her fantasies about her uncle. Haskell is supposed to be Judy's escort to the school dance ahead. Back in the apartment, Harry's boss J. B. Curtis is visiting with his pretty daughter and secretary Ellen. Letting her imagination run wild after seeing a kiss, Judy believes that her father is infatuated with Ellen, and tells her friend Fuffy that her father and Ellen are romantically involved.

The next day, Uncle Willis makes a surprise visit, and Judy concocts the idea that he would be the perfect match for Ellen. Right after Christmas Day, Judy secretly arranges for them to meet at the Rockefeller Center ice-skating rink, and Willis and Ellen soon become a couple. Harry's boss is troubled, as Ellen is constantly absent from the office, sneaking away to meet Willis. Ellen does not tell her father about Willis, but Judy cannot keep the secret any longer and on New Year's Day, she slips to Curtis that Ellen is seeing Willis, mentioning her false belief that Willis is a former convict. Curtis, worried and furious, scolds Harry and Grace for letting the relationship begin and continue, and they confront Judy. Willis and Ellen arrive in the middle of the argument, announcing that they have married. Curtis fires Harry when he defends Willis and his family.

The family decides that Grace and the children should live with her mother in Kansas City until Harry finds another job. They also offer to let the newlyweds live with them until they can stand on their own feet. Curtis makes an unannounced visit in search of his daughter, and Ellen and Willis are hidden away for the moment. As it is the night of Judy's school dance, Haskell arrives to collect Judy. He is announced, and when Curtis hears the name, he believes that it is Haskell Cummings Sr., the businessman whose account he and Harry have been trying to win. Believing that Harry is starting his own firm and has landed the influential Cummings as his client, he offers to hire Harry back to the law firm as a partner, and he is also willing to hire Willis. Realizing that Curtis is mistaken, Harry accepts the offer. Ellen reconciles with her father, and Curtis is surprised to see the young Haskell enter the apartment. Judy appears, beautiful and ladylike, dressed in her ball dress, and she and Haskell leave the proud adults for the dance.

== Cast ==
- Peggy Ann Garner as Judy Graves
- Allyn Joslyn as Harry Graves
- Stephen Dunne as Uncle Willis Reynolds (as Michael Dunne)
- Faye Marlowe as Ellen Curtis
- Mona Freeman as Lois Graves
- Sylvia Field as Mrs. Graves
- Barbara Whiting as Fuffy Adams
- Scotty Beckett as Haskell Cummings
- Stanley Prager as Joe
- John Alexander as J. B. Curtis
- Connie Gilchrist as Hilda
- Ruby Dandridge as Rheba

== Reception ==
In a contemporary review for The New York Times, critic Bosley Crowther called Junior Miss "a brisk farce-comedy" and wrote: "[T]his film is a laughing entertainment in the strictly domestic line. It tells with a great deal of humor of the confusion and upheavals caused by a highly imaginative and meddlesome 'junior miss' in a New York apartment home. And it also contains some illuminating—albeit farcical—comment on kids which is much closer to realities than such comment in other films we could name. ... The few precious moments of poignance that were in the play are barely caught. Otherwise it is a happy picture—provided you feel it's worth the risk."

== See also ==
- List of films set around New Year
