= Junior Miss =

1941 short story collection by Sally Benson

First edition (published by Random House in April 1941)

Junior Miss is a collection of short stories by Sally Benson which first appeared in The New Yorker magazine. Between 1939 and the end of 1941, the prolific Benson published 99 stories in The New Yorker, some under her pseudonym of Esther Evarts. She had a bestseller when Random House published the Junior Miss collection on April 23, 1941.

The stories focus on a young teenager named Judy Graves. Her adventures were drawn from Benson's own adolescent experiences, as well as from Benson's observations of her teenaged daughter Barbara and Barbara's friends.

== Reception ==
The Junior Miss book was praised for its rare (at the time) portrayal of adolescent rites of passage from a female point of view. In The New York Times Book Review, Robert van Gelder described Judy as "too young to be called a young lady but too old to be called a young girl" who "recreated in the minds of adult readers of either sex, a sense of their almost-forgotten youth." In The Saturday Review of Literature, Gladys Graham Bates commended Benson's "uncanny accuracy in catching the exact detail" but added, "If you put these tales aside as children's stories simply, you will miss some extremely shrewd comment on human nature in general and our own day in particular."

Junior Miss quickly became a bestseller and, in June 1941, a Book-of-the-Month club selection with over 150,000 copies distributed. The popularity of Junior Miss led to multiple adaptations.

== Broadway ==
Benson's stories were adapted for the stage by writers Jerome Chodorov and Joseph Fields, producer Max Gordon, and director Moss Hart. Junior Miss had a successful theatrical run of 710 performances on Broadway from November 18, 1941, to July 24, 1943. Patricia Peardon played the title role of Judy Graves, a teenager who meddles in people's love lives. The sets for the production were designed by Frederick Fox.

== Film ==
In 1945, 20th Century-Fox released a film adaptation of the Chodorov and Fields' play. It starred Peggy Ann Garner as Judy Graves. Directed by George Seaton and produced by William Perlberg, the 94-minute feature film opened in movie theaters on June 16, 1945.

== Radio ==
Junior Miss was adapted several times for American radio. The first series, sponsored by Procter & Gamble, was broadcast from March 4 to August 26, 1942, with Shirley Temple as Judy Graves. Priscilla Lyon played her friend Fuffy Adams, "the odd child from the apartment downstairs." The show was co-written by Benson and Doris Gilbert. Broadcast on Wednesday evenings, each episode cost $12,000 to produce.

From 1944 to 1946, a "Junior Miss" segment, based on Benson's short stories, was a regular feature on the Mary Small Show (later changed to the Mary Small-Junior Miss Show).

A condensed 30-minute version of the Junior Miss film was presented on radio twice in 1946, with Peggy Ann Garner again playing the Judy Graves role. The show was broadcast on CBS's Hollywood Star Time, and on The Lady Esther Screen Guild Theater.

A new Junior Miss radio series began in 1948. The title role was performed by Barbara Whiting, who had appeared in the 1945 film as Fuffy Adams. The series, sponsored by Lever Brothers, ran from April 3, 1948, to December 30, 1950. The music was composed and conducted by Walter Schumann. The 1948-50 cast returned for additional episodes in various formats and timeslots from October 2, 1952, to July 1, 1954.

== Television ==
Chodorov and Fields' stage version of Junior Miss was adapted into a television musical. It aired on December 20, 1957, as part of CBS Television's DuPont Show of the Month. Carol Lynley played the lead role of Judy Graves, with Don Ameche and Joan Bennett as her parents, and Susanne Sidney as Fuffy Adams. Other cast members included Diana Lynn, Paul Ford, Jill St. John and David Wayne.
