= Broadway Rose =

Broadway Rose may refer to:

- Broadway Rose (panhandler), panhandler in the Broadway theater district of New York City
- Broadway Rose (film), a 1922 silent film
- Broadway Rose Theatre Company, a musical theatre company based in Tigard, Oregon

== See also ==
- Broadway Danny Rose, a 1984 American black-and-white comedy film
