= Anniversary Waltz =

Anniversary Waltz may refer to:

- Anniversary Waltz (play), a 1954 play directed by Moss Hart
- Anniversary Waltz (The Colbys), a 1986 episode of the television series The Colbys
- "The Anniversary Waltz", a popular song published in 1941
- "The Anniversary Waltz" (Status Quo song), two medley singles released in 1990 by the rock band Status Quo
- "Waves of the Danube", also known as "The Anniversary Song" or "The Anniversary Waltz"
