= My Sister Eileen =

Story by Ruth McKenney

First edition (publ. Harcourt Brace)

My Sister Eileen is a series of autobiographical short stories by Ruth McKenney, originally published in The New Yorker, which eventually inspired many other works: her 1938 book My Sister Eileen, a play, a musical, a radio play (and an unproduced radio series), two motion pictures, and a CBS television series in the 1960–1961 season.

The stories center on two sisters from Ohio who are out to make successful careers while living in a basement apartment in the Greenwich Village section of New York City. Older, sensible Ruth Sherwood aspires to be a writer, while Eileen dreams of success on the stage. A variety of oddball characters bring color and humor to their lives.

== Adaptations ==
=== 1940 play ===
The stories were adapted for the stage by Joseph Fields and Jerome Chodorov. The Broadway production, directed by George S. Kaufman, opened on December 26, 1940 at the Biltmore Theatre and moved three times before finally completing its run of 864 performances on January 16, 1943. The opening night cast included Shirley Booth as Ruth Sherwood and Jo Ann Sayers as Eileen Sherwood, with Richard Quine and Morris Carnovsky in supporting roles.

Eileen McKenney, the inspiration for the title character, and her husband, novelist and screenwriter Nathanael West, were killed in a car accident in Southern California four days before the Broadway opening.

=== 1942 film ===
Fields and Chodorov adapted their play for a 1942 film released by Columbia Pictures (their biggest hit of 1942/1943). Alexander Hall directed a cast that includes Rosalind Russell as Ruth (in an Academy Award–nominated performance) and Janet Blair as Eileen, with Brian Aherne, George Tobias, Allyn Joslyn, Elizabeth Patterson, Grant Mitchell, Jeff Donnell, and Richard Quine in supporting roles.

=== 1946 radio play and unproduced radio series ===
On May 18, 1946 Rosalind Russell and Janet Blair reprised their roles in a half-hour radio adaptation of the 1942 film for the CBS Radio anthology series Academy Award Theater. During the closing credits show announcer Hugh Brundage stated that a radio series based on the two main characters was being prepared by writer Arthur Kurlan. He added that it would star Lucille Ball and it would premiere in the fall. However CBS ultimately turned down the proposed series after only a sample audition record was made.

In 1947 CBS began airing a new radio series, My Friend Irma, which contained the same basic premise and characterizations. In response, Arthur Kurlan sued CBS on behalf of himself and Ruth McKenney, ultimately winning compensation from CBS.

=== 1953 Broadway musical ===
Wonderful Town, with lyrics by Betty Comden and Adolph Green, music by Leonard Bernstein, and book by Fields and Chodorov, is a musical stage adaptation of the 1940 play, which was in turn based on McKenney's stories. Rosalind Russell reprised the part of Ruth for the Broadway production and appeared in a CBS television broadcast of the musical on November 30, 1958. It was revived on Broadway, starring Donna Murphy, in 2004.

=== 1955 film ===
In 1955, Columbia made a film as a musical comedy with a score by Jule Styne and Leo Robin. Richard Quine and Blake Edwards wrote the screenplay, and Quine directed. The cast includes Betty Garrett as Ruth and Janet Leigh as Eileen, with Jack Lemmon, Bob Fosse (who choreographed the musical numbers), Kurt Kasznar, Dick York, Arnold Stang, and Tommy Rall in supporting roles.

=== 1960–1961 television series ===
A pilot for a television series based on the short stories and subsequent film adaptations aired on NBC as an episode of Alcoa-Goodyear Theater titled "You Should Meet My Sister" on May 16, 1960, starring Elaine Stritch as Ruth and Anne Helm as Eileen. Twenty-six more episodes were produced with Stritch as Ruth and Shirley Bonne portraying Eileen, and CBS broadcast these in the United States during the 1960–1961 season as the situation comedy My Sister Eileen. The series premiered on October 5, 1960. It was canceled after one season, and last aired on April 12, 1961.
