= Jennifer Hope Wills =

American actress and singer (born 2008)

- Born: Baltimore, Maryland
- Education: Salisbury University (BA); Indiana University (MM)
- Occupations: Actress, singer
- Website: http://jenniferhopewills.com/

Jennifer Hope Wills is an American actress and singer who has starred on Broadway and in many of the top regional theatres and concert halls across the country. She was the first child of William and Sue Wills. She made her stage debut at the age of 1 in a production of Rumplestiltskin performed by the Baltimore Actor's Theatre alongside her father and went on to star on Broadway and in Regional Theatres across the country. She has a son born in 2008 named Vincent.

== Early years ==
The family moved to Ocean City, Maryland where her parents established a live children's theater. Parker Playhouse opened in 1978 and over time became a favorite of the city's many summertime visitors. Jennifer performed in almost every production the theater company produced. Her parents now run Presidents and Their First Ladies Dramatically Speaking, a production company that performs nationwide and provides high insight to the personal lives of many presidents and their wives.

Wills received a BA from Salisbury University where she starred on the main stage as Maria in West Side Story, Lily in The Secret Garden and Elizabeth Sandry in The Grapes of Wrath. She then earned her MM at the prestigious Indiana University School of Music where she starred on the main stage as Laurey in Oklahoma!, Papagena in The Magic Flute, Josephine in H.M.S. Pinafore and Gossip I in The Ghosts of Versailles. After graduating she taught voice at the college level for two years before heading to New York City.

== Broadway ==
Wills made her Broadway debut in 2004 as the understudy for Belle in Disney's Beauty and the Beast. Eight months later she had to leave abruptly as she became an immediate replacement for Jennifer Westfeldt as Eileen co-starring opposite Brooke Shields in Wonderful Town. Both Wills and Shields received amazing reviews with Clive Barnes of the New York Post stating that "Both Shields and Wills are smashing. These two are not replacements, they are renewals". and Ben Brantley singled Wills out for her own little feature. They also re-released the original new cast recording with their voices replacing the original stars.

Wonderful Town only ran four more months so Wills was out of work and decided against other people's better judgment to accept a replacement ensemble position in Andrew Lloyd Webber's The Woman in White. However, this productions was very short lived and Wills performed in it for just one week. But that job led directly to Wills getting to audition for her dream job, Christine Daaé in The Phantom of the Opera. She was immediately asked to become the Alternate (performing the role twice weekly) and just two months later was asked to take the Principal position on the National Tour for 10 weeks as they traveled through Canada where she received rave reviews. Upon her return to NYC, she became the Principal in the Broadway Production and remained so for many years. Overall she was with the production for over 4 years from March 2006 - August 2010 with time off for maternity leave.

Wills also has sung in concert with City Center's Encores!, at Town Hall, Merkin Concert Hall, with the Houston, Portland, Omaha and Asheville Symphonies, The Long Island Philharmonic and at the Mar-a-Lago club for Donald Trump and guests.

== Regional theater ==
Much of Wills' career has been made of starring in some of the top regional theaters across the country.

- Paper Mill Playhouse: Sandy in Grease! 2003, Lady Anne in Camelot 2003
- Pittsburgh CLO: Julie in Carousel 2005 opposite Matt Cavanaugh, Maria in The Sound of Music opposite Robert Cuccioli, 2011
- Walnut Street Theatre: Sharon in Finian's Rainbow 2005, Rose Vibert in Aspects of Love 2011, Marian in The Music Man 2012
- Riverside Theatre: Marian in The Music Man 2012
- Gateway Playhouse: Eliza Doolittle in My Fair Lady 2012
- Sacramento Music Circus: Magnolia in "Showboat" 2013, Nimue in Camelot 2003
