= Anniversary Waltz (play) =

Play by Joseph Fields and Peter De Vries

- Original language: English
- Written by: Jerome Chodorov and Joseph Fields
- Subject: Domestic discord
- Genre: Comedy
- Setting: Living room of the Walters NYC apartment, mid 1950s

Premiere
- Date: April 7, 1954
- Place: Broadhurst Theatre, New York City
- Directed by: Moss Hart

Anniversary Waltz is a three-act play, written by Jerome Chodorov and Joseph Fields, and staged by Moss Hart. It is a comedy with a simple plot, medium-sized cast, fast pacing, and only one setting. The action varies from farce to schmaltz, as the Walters celebrate their fifteenth wedding anniversary only to have a family secret go public and send everyone into a frenzy.

The play was produced by Joseph M. Hyman and Bernard Hart. It was a box office success on Broadway, running for 615 performances, despite major reservations by some reviewers. It is filled with attitudes and references topical to mid 1950s American culture; this and the lack of critical appreciation seems to have forestalled any major revivals. The writers later adapted their work into a screenplay, which was released in 1959 as Happy Anniversary.

== Characters ==
Leads

- Bud Walters is a volatile husband and father, fond of his wife but not his in-laws, who loathes television.
- Alice Walters is Bud's wife, who manages the family finances, and tries to walk the tightrope between her husband, parents, and kids.

Supporting

- Mrs. Gans: is Alice's mother, prim in outlook, and inclined to let people know their faults. (Note: Often addressed as Lily by her husband, but all credits omit first name.)
- Mr. Gans, is Alice's father, a generous soul who is amazed at how the world keeps changing. (Note: Often addressed as Arthur by his wife, but all credits omit first name)
- Okkie Walters, is Bud and Alice's 14-year-old son, easygoing, a would-be charmer, who teases his younger sister.
- Debbie Walters is Bud and Alice's 13-year-old daughter, alert to adult hypocrisy, quite frank in speech, and prone to worry.
- Millie is the Walters' maid, "part clown and part philosopher", prone to eavesdropping.
- Chris Steelman is an older bachelor, Bud's business partner, a bit of a womanizer.
- Janice Revere is a much-married woman, maudlin and mercenary, who admires Alice's marital longevity.

Featured

- Harry is an installer for Johnson TV Service, who delivers the TV sets gifted by Mr. Gans and Chris.
- Sam is Harry's helper.
- Handyman replaces a bedroom door twice broken by Bud during arguments with Alice.

Voice only

- Moderator of television program Juvenile Jury, heard but not seen.
- Various voices for commercials heard on the television.

== Synopsis ==
The Walters are celebrating their fifteenth wedding anniversary. Alice's parents are due for an evening get together, so she supervises Okkie and Debbie's choice of attire and Millie's preparation for the gathering. Harry and Sam deliver and install a TV set, a gift from Mr. Gans. Knowing Bud's violent dislike of television, everyone is a bit apprehensive. Bud arrives home with his business partner Chris Steelman, and Janice Revere, a new friend of Chris. All three are a bit merry with drink. Janice, who has married well and often, admires Alice's ability to pick a good partner on the first try. Chris and Janice leave, while Bud notices the TV and explodes. Alice calms him, asking his indulgence for that evening. He relents, just as Alice's parents arrive. Mrs. Gans is shocked when Debbie uses the word "prostitute" in response to Mr. Gans telling her what a "vamp" was. As the evening progresses, Bud, warmed with affection for Alice and primed with champagne, carelessly lets slip that he and Alice had premarital relations. The kids and Millie overhear the admission, and the resulting outrage from the grandparents. As Bud justifies it to his in-laws, they grow huffy and storm out of the apartment. Bud angrily kicks the TV, wrecking it. Alice is distraught over Bud's slip and the resulting fight with her parents. She locks herself into the bedroom. Bud then breaks the door and lock trying to enter.

The next morning a handyman brings in a new door and lock for the bedroom. Bud and Alice reconcile, but Alice says Debbie asked if they were going to get divorced. Later, Janice shows up at the Walters apartment alone, to talk with Alice, who has gone out. Millie reluctantly admits her, and Janice sees the handyman repairing the door. Alice returns, and Janice is enlightened that even good marriages have their storms. Harry and Sam return to the apartment with another new TV, this one a gift from Chris. Okkie persuades Bud to watch a little television while they are relaxing. Bud likes the commercials, but then a program called Juvenile Jury comes on the set. They are all stunned to see Debbie on the program as a guest. She tells the moderator that her parents had a quarrel, they resent her trying to help heal the breach, and she's worried they may get divorced. Bud and Okkie are in an uproar. As a punctuation to the brouhaha, Bud kicks in the second TV set.

As Millie sweeps up shattered remains, Debbie returns home to an ominous welcome from her father. Debbie is contrite, realizing she has gone too far. Alice whisks Debbie away while Bud fumes alone, until Chris shows up. Seeing the broken TV, he and Bud begin to quarrel. Bud finally leaves the apartment, with Chris following, trying to calm him down. Four days later, Alice and the kids breakfast alone; Bud has stayed away. Okkie assures Alice that Bud is simply cooling off. Chris arrives at the apartment to intervene for Bud, who is waiting outside the apartment. Bud apologizes for staying away, and asks forgiveness, but he had to get his head straight. Alice forgives him and further informs him she's expecting. They embrace and play ends.

== Original production ==
=== Background ===
The first public word of this production came when the producers put out a casting call for thirteen years old actresses. Despite the producer being her brother-in-law, the director her husband, and one of the writers (Fields) her husband's best friend, Kitty Carlisle auditioned along with other actresses at the Coronet Theater in December 1953, and had to wait two weeks before being told she had the part. MacDonald Carey, the male lead, was signed in late December 1953, weeks before Carlisle. Rehearsals began February 8, 1954 under Hart's direction; the setting was designed and lit by Frederick Fox, while costumes were by Robert Mackintosh.

=== Cast ===
Save for one featured role eliminated during a rewrite in Boston, the cast remained the same throughout all three tryout cities and the Broadway premiere. However, as the Broadway run lengthened, replacements began to occur, as shown below.

Cast during tryouts in New Haven, Boston, Philadelphia and the original Broadway run
Role	Actor	Dates	Notes
Bud Walters	MacDonald Carey	Mar 03, 1954 - May 21, 1955	This was Carey's first return to Broadway in over 13 years.
Bud Walters	Andrew Duggan	May 23, 1955 - Sep 22, 1955	Duggan switched from the Chris Steelman role to the lead.
Bud Walters	Leif Erickson	Sep 23, 1955 - Sep 24, 1955	Erickson took over the last three performances on Broadway prior to heading up the national tour.
Alice Walters	Kitty Carlisle	Mar 03, 1954 - Jan 27, 1955	This was her first non-singing Broadway role and the first time her husband directed her.
Alice Walters	Marjorie Lord	Jan 28, 1955 - Jul 02, 1955	
Alice Walters	Jeanne Shepherd	Jul 03, 1955 - Sep 22, 1955	
Alice Walters	Phyllis Hill	Sep 23, 1955 - Sep 24, 1955	Hill took over the role for the last three Broadway performances prior to joining the tour.
Mrs. Gans	Phyllis Povah	Mar 03, 1954 - Sep 22, 1955	
Mrs. Gans	Josephine Brown	Sep 23, 1955 - Sep 24, 1955	Brown took over the role for the last three Broadway performances before joining the tour.
Mr. Gans	Howard Smith	Mar 03, 1954 - Sep 24, 1955	Smith was the only actor to play the entire production run, from tryouts through the national tour.
Okkie Walters	Warren Berlinger	Mar 03, 1954 - Sep 24, 1955	
Janice Revere	Jean Carson	Mar 03, 1954 - Apr 16, 1955	
Janice Revere	Patricia Shay	Apr 18, 1955 - Sep 24, 1955	
Debbie Walters	Mary Lee Dearring	Mar 03, 1954 -	Dearring left in late 1954 to be a regular on syndicated TV series His Honor, Homer Bell.
Debbie Walters	Patty Foster	Feb 10, 1955	According to newspaper, Foster had matured out of the role.
Debbie Walters	Jacqueline Kerner	Feb 11, 1955 - Sep 24, 1955	Kerner was fourteen when she took over this role.
Chris Steelman	Andrew Duggan	Mar 03, 1954 - Sep 08, 1954	Duggan left this role for a lead in Fragile Fox.
Chris Steelman	David White	Sep 09, 1954 - Nov 28, 1954	White's brief tenure ended with a knee injury.
Chris Steelman	Andrew Duggan	Nov 29, 1954 - May 21, 1955	Duggan returned to this role then switched to playing the lead in May 1955.
Chris Steelman	Robert Burr	May 23, 1955 - Sep 24, 1955	
Millie	Pauline Myers	Mar 03, 1954 - Sep 24, 1955	
Harry	Don Grusso	Mar 03, 1954 - Sep 24, 1955	
Sam	Donald Hylan	Mar 03, 1954 - Sep 20, 1954	Hylan left to take over the role of Carl Gibson in By the Beautiful Sea
Sam	Donald McClelland	Sep 21, 1954 - Sep 24, 1955	This was his last known role; he died less than two months after this production closed.
Handyman	Terry Little	Mar 03, 1954 -	
Handyman	James Bender	-	
Handyman	Sam Locante	Sep 24, 1955	
Diane	Pamela O'Neill	Mar 03, 1954 - Mar 20, 1954	This was a juvenile role, a friend of Debbie Walters, reduced to only a mention in dialogue during the Boston tryout.

=== Tryouts ===
Anniversary Waltz had its first tryout at the Shubert Theatre in New Haven, Connecticut on March 3, 1954. The local reviewer acknowledged the audience liked the play, but was scathing about the writing. The direction and acting were fine according to the reviewer: "It's only the play itself that is witless and tasteless". Chodorov and Fields had used "the same old waggery and same old schmaltz", updated with a few new tricks and topical references.

The company then went to Boston for two weeks, opening at the Plymouth Theatre on March 8, 1954. Reviewer Cyrus Durgin sounded a doubtful note about what sort of play it was, "something between farce, drama, and animated comic strip". He felt the writers had thrown too much frenetic action and wisecracks into the play and suggested cutting back somewhat. The writers seem to have taken his advice, paring away one featured role during this tryout. Durgin was positive about the performers, especially the two supporting youngsters, Warren Berlinger and Mary Lee Dearring.

Moss Hart was wary of tough audiences at the National Theatre. So the production went to Philadelphia next, opening at the Locust Theatre on March 23, 1954, as part of the Theatre Guild local subscription series. Reviewer Henry T. Murdock pointed out that the character of Bud Walters "wasn't really a very funny fellow at all, and that his antics were humorous only by the most tolerant definition of the term." Nevertheless, Murdock conceded, the audience appreciated the performance.

=== Premiere ===
The play premiered at the Broadhurst Theatre on April 7, 1954. MacDonald Carey and Kitty Carlisle received top-billing, i.e. their names appeared above the play's title in advertisements. When Carlisle left the show, Carey retained his top-billing; after his departure no other actor was so honored. Actor Howard Smith had a bad case of laryngitis on opening night but managed to get through his part successfully.

=== Reception ===
Critical opinion was cool to the play. Brooks Atkinson of The New York Times was severe in his criticism of the writers, but gave a pass to the staging: "Taking the material as offered, Moss Hart has directed a suitable performance-- swift, taut and noisy". He also praised the performances and setting, before turning again to the writers. Comparing their previous Broadway collaborations to this production, Atkinson said: "The decline in literary skill is notable. In Anniversary Waltz they have practically ceased to be writers. They are mechanics." Reviewer Louis Sheaffer felt the same way: "There isn't... any story here, only a series of contrived situations somehow tied together, a patchwork sort of affair". Like Atkinson, Schaeffer commended the directing and setting, but called Jean Carson and Andrew Duggan routine and claimed juvenile actor Mary Lee Dearring overacted. He also mentioned that Kitty Carlisle "at times sounds uncannily like Ethel Merman". Only critic John Chapman offered praise for the production, while suggesting that for the storyline, less might be more. He judged the characters portrayed by Andrew Duggan and Jean Carson as "extraneous to the plot, but they are nicely played".

Despite the criticism, the play proved popular with audiences. There is reason to suspect that when critics brand a straight comedy as "tasteless" or "vulgar", they are doing it a favor.

=== Change of venue ===
The production moved to the Booth Theatre, one block away from the Broadhurst, on December 6, 1954. Later in the month columnist Danton Walker reported that Anniversary Waltz had paid off its entire original investment and was up $45,000.

=== Closing ===
The original Broadway run closed on September 24, 1955, at the Booth Theatre after 615 performances. For the final three performances, the producers replaced some of the actors with their national tour counterparts, both for experience and to give them the cachet of a Broadway credit.

== National tour ==
Joseph M. Hyman and Bernard Hart exercised their option to produce the road company, which would start in Cincinnati at the Shubert Theatre on September 26, 1955. Howard Smith was the only major actor from the Broadway run to commit to the tour. The tour also marked the performing debut of thirteen year-old Carol Lynley.

=== Cast ===
Cast for the start of the national tour on September 26, 1955
Actor	Role	Type	Notes
Leif Erickson	Bud Walters	Lead	Reportedly Erickson was recommended to the producers by Moss Hart.
Phyllis Hill	Alice Walters	Lead	
Howard Smith	Mr. Gans	Supporting	
Josephine Brown	Mrs. Gans	Supporting	
Andrew Sanders	Okkie Walters	Supporting	
Carol Lynley	Debbie Walters	Supporting	At age thirteen this was Lynley's first known professional credit.
Earl Rowe	Chris Steelman	Supporting	
Betty Bartley	Janice Revere	Supporting	
Helen Martin	Millie	Supporting	
Mario Gallo	Harry	Featured	
Eddie Hall	Sam	Featured	
James Bender	Handyman	Featured	Bender had played this role, which was more visual than verbal, on Broadway for a while.

== Adaptions ==
=== Film ===
Jerome Chodorov and Joseph Fields converted their stage play into a screenplay. The character names of Bud and Chris were switched around when David Niven was signed for the lead. (Note: It simply defied credibility that an obviously English-sounding character should be named "Bud".) The film was hampered by the then Motion Picture Production Code that emasculated many stage to film transfers.
