= My Sister Eileen (1942 film) =

1942 film by Alexander Hall

- Original poster
- Directed by: Alexander Hall
- Screenplay by: Joseph A. Fields; Jerome Chodorov
- Based on: My Sister Eileen; 1940 play by Joseph A. Fields; Jerome Chodorov
- Produced by: Max Gordon
- Starring: Rosalind Russell; Brian Aherne; Janet Blair; George Tobias; Allyn Joslyn
- Cinematography: Joseph Walker
- Edited by: Viola Lawrence
- Music by: Sidney Cutner
- Production company: Columbia Pictures
- Distributed by: Columbia Pictures
- Release date: September 24, 1942
- Running time: 97 minutes
- Country: United States
- Language: English
- Box office: $2.2 million (U.S. rentals)

My Sister Eileen is a 1942 American comedy film directed by Alexander Hall and starring Rosalind Russell, Brian Aherne, and Janet Blair. The screenplay by Joseph A. Fields and Jerome Chodorov is based on their 1940 play of the same name, inspired by Ruth McKenney's autobiographical short stories first published in The New Yorker. The supporting cast features George Tobias, Allyn Joslyn, Grant Mitchell, Gordon Jones, and The Three Stooges (Moe Howard, Larry Fine, and Curly Howard) in a cameo appearance.

== Plot ==
Ruth Sherwood, a reporter for the Columbus Courier, finds herself embroiled in a series of misfortunes after inadvertently publishing a premature and erroneous review of her sister Eileen's theatrical performance. This blunder results in Ruth's dismissal from her position. Encouraged by their grandmother, the two sisters, Ruth and Eileen, decide to relocate to New York City, armed with meager financial resources provided by their father.

Upon their arrival in Greenwich Village, the sisters encounter a plethora of challenges, including disruptive construction work, rowdy neighbors, and encounters with law enforcement. Despite these initial setbacks, Ruth endeavors to secure employment while Eileen navigates the world of theater. Their humble abode becomes a hub of activity as an eclectic assortment of characters, including neighbors, acquaintances, and unexpected visitors, converge on their doorstep.

In New York, Ruth and Eileen encounter romantic complications, career setbacks, and family tensions. Ruth's writing attracts the attention of a publisher. The film ends with the sisters finding professional success and new friendships.

As they leave the apartment to celebrate, a trio of construction workers (The Three Stooges) drill through the floor from the new subway tunnel below. The film ends with Curly saying, "Hey, Moe! I think you made a wrong turn!"

== Cast ==
- Rosalind Russell as Ruth Sherwood
- Brian Aherne as Robert Baker
- Janet Blair as Eileen Sherwood
- George Tobias as Appopolous
- Allyn Joslyn as Chic Clark
- Grant Mitchell as Walter Sherwood
- Gordon Jones as Wreck Loomis
- Elizabeth Patterson as Grandma Sherwood
- Richard Quine as Frank Lippincott
- June Havoc as Effie Shelton
- Donald MacBride as Officer Lonigan
- Clyde Fillmore as Ralph Craven
- Jeff Donnell as Helen Loomis
- The Three Stooges:
  - Moe Howard as Moe (uncredited)
  - Larry Fine as Larry (uncredited)
  - Curly Howard as Curly (uncredited)

== Critical reception ==
Bosley Crowther of The New York Times called the film "largely a farcical juggling act in which the authors . . . keep their characters spinning more through speed than grace. Some of it is forced almost to snapping; some of it drags heavily on the screen. And Alexander Hall, the director, did little with his camera in that small room. But Rosalind Russell plays the smart sister with a delightfully dour and cynical air, and Janet Blair is disarmingly naive as the pretty, desirable one . . . My Sister Eileen is gay and bouncing."

In his review of the DVD release of the film, Steve Daly of Entertainment Weekly graded it B+, calling it "a screwball spleenfest, pitching gag after fastball gag." He added, "While the tone is farcical, there's an edge to the movie's depiction of single-gal city life."

== Awards and nominations ==
Rosalind Russell was nominated for the Academy Award for Best Actress at the 15th Academy Awards but lost to Greer Garson in Mrs. Miniver.

== Adaptations in other media ==
Brian Aherne, Russell, and Blair reprised their parts on the Lux Radio Theater adaptation of My Sister Eileen on July 5, 1943, and again on The Screen Guild Theater adaptation on October 18, 1943.

On May 18, 1946, My Sister Eileen was again adapted as a radio play on Academy Award Theater, in recognition of Russell's Oscar nomination. Russell and Blair reprised their parts.
