= Mary Lee Dearring =

American actress (1939–2019)

- Mary Lee Dearring in The Dick Van Dyke Show 1961
- Born: Mary Lee Margaret Dearring; March 11, 1939; New York City, New York
- Died: June 19, 2019 (aged 80)
- Resting place: Arneytown, New Jersey
- Other name: Mary Lee Dearing
- Occupation: Actress
- Years active: 1947–1973
- Spouse: Wallace Foster Tracy (1966-2009 his death)

Mary Lee Margaret Dearring (March 11, 1939 - June 16, 2019) was an American child actress who was active from 1947 until 1973. Starting as a child model, she performed in films, television, and the stage, including a six-month run on Broadway for Anniversary Waltz, and a regular starring role on a television series as a teenager.

== Early life ==
She was born in Manhattan on March 11, 1939, the only child of Earnest Dearring and Lene "Lee" Belisario. Her father was a vaudville dancer. During the late 1930s he had travelled the vaudville circuit performing musical comedy tap routines with a female partner under the name of "Lynn & Dearring". Its not known whether this partner was his wife, though a booking notice from two months after Dearring's birth suggests otherwise. However, Lene "Lee" Belisario- Dearring was also known as a dance instructor.

According to a later newspaper article, in which Deerring provided a biographical sketch in her own words, she started modeling and studying ballet at age four. From age eleven she attended the Professional Children's School in New York City, both in person and through correspondence work while on the road. She also was a member of the Experimental Theater group in New York City.

== Early career ==
According to Dearring's own account, her career as a child model was short-lived: "I did quite a bit of modeling before television came in, but when it did I stopped modeling and spent most of my time on TV". However, her earliest known performances were uncredited bits in motion pictures. From 1947 thru 1949, she appeared in four films: Citizen Saint, The Naked City, Portrait of Jennie, and The Window. In 1949, she did her first known television show, Texaco Star Theater with Milton Berle as host. She did three more shows in the following two years: The Ken Murray Show, Four Star Revue when Jimmy Durante was host, and an episode of Fireside Theatre.

From September through November 1952, Dearing played herself for an episode of a documentary series called American Inventory.

This weekly series focused on different aspects of American life; the episode Dearring took part in was about the impact of railroads on America. She travelled 8500 miles by rail from San Francisco through to the East Coast, stopping at many points along the way to film rail-related activities. A columnist covering this show reported extensively on her career to date, quoting from an autobiographical sketch she had prepared.

== Broadway stage ==
A revival of The Children's Hour on Broadway during 1952-1953 led to a national tour starting in the fall of 1953. Dearring was selected to play the role of "Evelyn Munn", touring with six other teenage girls in the road company from September thru November 1953. In December 1953 she answered an open casting call in Manhattan for thirteen year-old actresses.

Dearring was cast as "Debbie Walters" in an original comedy called Anniversary Waltz; she performed in all three tryout runs and the Broadway premiere. It was a supporting role with a significant amount of stage time and lines, and triggered the second act climax. Dearring received good reviews from most critics, though one accused her of overacting while another described her as "a typical polished output of a school for young professionals". Dearing was with the Broadway production for about six months, but left when the opportunity of a television series opened up in the Fall of 1954. (Note: Dearring perhaps had a hint that she was growing beyond the character; Patty Foster, her replacement, was later dismissed for maturing out of the role.)

== TV Series ==
This NBC syndicated series was filmed in Brooklyn, and starred Gene Lockhart as Judge Homer Bell. Dearring had second billing as his orphaned fifteen year-old niece, Cassandra "Casey" Bell. Episodes of the series started filming in 1954, and by February 1955 were ready for release to syndication. Many of the 39 episodes were built around Dearring's character, who was a tomboy and active in misguided ways to help her uncle the Judge. The series was shown on different stations around the country from 1955 to 1961.

== Later stage and television ==
Dearring did episodes of two different TV anthology series during 1955–1956, and reprised her role in Anniversary Waltz for the touring company. When the Broadway comedy The Happiest Millionaire went on national tour in 1957 virtually the entire original cast went with it, including stars Walter Pidgeon and George Grizzard. However, one ingenue supporting role was open, as Gaye Jordan had been promoted to a lead. Dearring stepped into the part and toured with the road company for seven months.

Sometime around 1959-1960 Dearring relocated to Los Angeles, taking an apartment in West Hollywood, California. She then went into summer stock, appearing in two plays at the La Jolla Playhouse during 1960, and in a regular season performance in Phoenix in early 1961. This led to a small flurry of TV parts on The Dick Van Dyke Show, It's a Man's World, and two episodes of The Danny Thomas Show. However, with the exception of a single appearance on The Brian Keith Show in 1973, this was her last known performing work.

== Personal life ==
As a girl, Dearring was a bit like her character Casey Bell: she liked to climb trees and play baseball. However, she also did oil painting and collected stamps.

Dearring married Wallace Foster Tracy in New York City during 1966. They remained married until his death in 2009. Dearring died on June 16, 2019, and is buried with her husband in Arneytown, New Jersey.

== Stage performances ==
Listed by year of first performance (excluding student productions)
| Year | Play | Role | Venue | Notes |
|---|---|---|---|---|
| 1953 | The Children's Hour | Evelyn Munn | Touring Company | This was the road company for Lillian Hellman's 1952-53 Broadway revival. |
| 1954 | Anniversary Waltz | Debbie Walters | Broadhurst Theatre | Dearring was with this production from the tryouts thru six months of the Broadway run. |
| 1956 | Anniversary Waltz | Debbie Walters | Touring Company | Dearring reprised her role, joining the road company in February 1956. |
| 1957 | The Happiest Millionaire | Cousin Lucy | Touring Company | Road company for the Broadway production, which included most of the original cast. |
| 1960 | Dark at the Top of the Stairs | Flirt Conroy | La Jolla Playhouse | |
| 1960 | Made in Heaven | Nancy Tennant | La Jolla Playhouse | A reviewer thought Dearring outshone the leads in the Hagar Wilde play. |
| 1961 | Personal Appearance | Gladys Keicey | Sombrero Playhouse | This week-long run starred Martha Raye, Hayden Rorke, and Jody McCrea. |

== Filmography ==
Film (by year of first release)
| Year | Title | Role | Notes |
|---|---|---|---|
| 1947 | Citizen Saint | | Uncredited |
| 1948 | The Naked City | | Uncredited |
| 1948 | Portrait of Jennie | Choir Girl | Uncredited; she was one of many young girls in the convent choir scene. |
| 1949 | The Window | | Uncredited |

Television (in original broadcast order, excluding commercials)
| Year | Series | Episode | Role | Notes |
|---|---|---|---|---|
| 1949 | Texaco Star Theater | (Unknown episode) | | Known only from later newspaper article. |
| 1950 | The Ken Murray Show | (Unknown episode) | | Known only from later newspaper article. |
| 1951 | Four Star Revue | (Unknown episode) | | Known only from later newspaper article. |
| 1951 | Fireside Theatre | A Christmas Carol | Belinda Cratchit | This was her first work with Gene Lockhart, whom she would later star with in a series. |
| 1952 | American Inventory | Let's Go America | Herself | Deerring travelled 8500 miles across the country by rail in this documentary series. |
| 1955 | His Honor, Homer Bell | (All 39 Episodes) | Cassandra "Casey" Bell | Dearring's only stint as a regular on a television series. |
| 1955 | Kraft Theatre | The Failure | | |
| 1956 | Goodyear Playhouse | The Film Director | | |
| 1961 | Danny Thomas Show | Everything Happens to Me | Julie | This was a tryout for a spin-off series, with Dearring and Marlo Thomas as Joey Bishop's sisters. |
| 1961 | Dick Van Dyke Show | The Sick Boy and the Sitter | Janie | |
| 1961 | Danny Thomas Show | Danny and Durante | Nightclub College Patron | |
| 1962 | It's a Man's World | Chicago Gains a Number | Miranda Overhill | |
| 1973 | The Brian Keith Show | The Camp Doctor | Mother | |
