= Drunk Driving (film) =

1939 film

- Directed by: David Miller
- Written by: Karl Kamb
- Produced by: Jack Chertok
- Starring: Dick Purcell
- Cinematography: Paul Vogel
- Edited by: Albert Akst
- Color process: Black and white
- Production company: Metro-Goldwyn-Mayer
- Distributed by: Loew's Inc.
- Release date: October 28, 1939
- Running time: 22 minutes
- Country: United States
- Language: English

Drunk Driving is a 1939 American short drama film directed by David Miller. It was nominated for an Academy Award at the 12th Academy Awards in 1940 for Best Live Action Short Film, Two-Reel.

It was part of the Crime Does Not Pay (film and radio series).

== Cast ==
- Dick Purcell as John Jones
- Jo Ann Sayers as Mrs. Jones
- Richard Lane as Rick
