= Max Gordon (producer) =

American theatre and film producer

- Born: Mechel Salpeter; June 28, 1892; New York City
- Died: November 2, 1978 (aged 86); New York City
- Occupation: Producer
- Spouse: Mildred Bartlett (aka Raye Dean)

Max Gordon (June 28, 1892 – November 2, 1978) was an American theater and film producer. His credits included My Sister Eileen, which he produced both on stage and on film.

== Biography ==
Born Mechel Salpeter, Gordon was the youngest son of immigrants from Poland. His older brother Cliff used the stage name of "Gordon," which Max adopted as well. Cliff, an entertainer in vaudeville and burlesque, died at age 32 in 1913.

Shortly after his brother's death Gordon, then in his early 20s, formed a vaudeville agency with Albert Lewis, his late brother's performing partner. They specialized in providing sketches for shows, and their material, and performers such as Phil Baker and Lou Holtz, played the Keith and Orpheum circuits.

In May 1921, Gordon married Mildred Bartlett of Amsterdam, New York, who performed under the stage name Raye Dean; at the request of her fiancé, Bartlett gave up her acting career a few months before the wedding. Soon after, Gordon started to produce plays, and quickly became one of New York's most successful producers, from the Roaring Twenties and Depression-era on into the Eisenhower years. One of his first great hits was the original stage production of The Jazz Singer, on which he partnered with Lewis, which ran from September 1925 to June 1926. The year following the stock market crash of 1929, the news of which he famously relayed to his friend and frequent tip recipient Groucho Marx by quipping "Marx, the jig is up," Gordon became an independent producer, with Three's A Crowd (1930) which opened to mixed reviews, but still ran for 271 performances. By 1932, broke and suffering from a nervous breakdown, friends provided financial support; his biographer Margaret Case Harriman reports that "George Kaufman offered him fifteen hundred of the sixteen hundred dollars Kaufman had at that time, and Harpo Marx came to see him in the hospital with his pockets stuffed with cash and strewed it over the bed..."

In the 1930s, Gordon became the producer of choice for playwright and director, George Kaufman, staging ten shows in 25 years, beginning in 1931 with Adele and Fred Astaire's last joint performance in the musical The Bandwagon. In the 1934, Gordon had four shows on Broadway at once, Her Master's Voice, Roberta, The Shining Hour and Dodsworth.

Gordon's other highly successful collaboration was with married playwrights Ruth Gordon and Garson Kanin. Kanin's Born Yesterday (1946) ran for 1,642 performances, and remains the seventh longest-running non-musical play in Broadway history. It also gave Judy Holliday her first starring part, and Gordon later recalled that "The minute she walked in, I knew she was it."

Gordon continued producing plays and musicals on Broadway until 1955. Several of his productions were made into popular films such as My Sister Eileen (1942), Born Yesterday (1950) and The Solid Gold Cadillac (1956).

His reputation in the early 1930s was immortalized in Cole Porter's song "Anything Goes" from the 1934 musical of the same name:

When Rockefeller still can hoard
Enough money to let Max Gordon
Produce his shows
Anything goes

== See also ==
- Beloff, Ruth (2007). "Gordon, Max". In Berenbaum, Michael; Skolnik, Fred (eds.). Encyclopaedia Judaica. Vol. 7 (2nd ed.). Detroit: Macmillan Reference USA. pp. 772–773. ISBN 978-0-02-866097-4.
