= My Sister Eileen (play) =

American comedy (premiered 1940)

- Original language: English
- Written by: Joseph A. Fields; Jerome Chodorov
- Subject: Two sisters from Ohio seek fame and fortune in Manhattan
- Genre: Comedy
- Setting: A basement studio apartment in Greenwich Village

Premiere
- Date: 26 December 1940
- Place: Biltmore Theatre; New York City

My Sister Eileen is an American comedy stage production, written by Joseph A. Fields and Jerome Chodorov, based on autobiographical short stories by Ruth McKenney. The stories were originally published in The New Yorker and then collected and published as the book My Sister Eileen in 1938.

The plot focuses on Ruth and Eileen Sherwood, sisters from Ohio who relocate to New York City in search of fame and fortune. Witty Ruth aspires to be a published writer, while pretty Eileen dreams of success as an actress. Their financial circumstances force them to rent a dingy basement studio apartment in a Greenwich Village building owned by Mr. Appopoulos, one of many colorful characters who cross their path.

The Broadway production, produced by Max Gordon and directed by George S. Kaufman, opened 26 December 1940 at the Biltmore Theatre. It transferred three times during its run of 864 performances: to the Martin Beck Theatre, opening 4 August 1942; to the Ritz Theatre, opening 23 November 1942; and to the Broadway Theatre, opening 13 December 1942.

The original cast included Shirley Booth as Ruth Sherwood, Jo Ann Sayers as Eileen Sherwood, Morris Carnovsky as Mr. Appopoulos, and Richard Quine as Frank Lippencott, a drugstore soda jerk with an eye for Eileen. Peggy Knudsen replaced Sayers in June 1942 (when she left to be married), and Quine was replaced by Henry Jones, who in turn was replaced by Max Showalter.

Eileen McKenney, an executive assistant to Walt Disney and the inspiration for the play's title character, and her husband, novelist and screenwriter Nathanael West, were killed in an automobile accident in El Centro, California on December 22, 1940, four days before the Broadway opening, while they were driving to the Los Angeles Airport to board a plane for New York to attend the play's premiere. Her sister Ruth consequently did not attend the premiere and never saw the play.

Fields and Chodorov adapted their play for the 1942 film that opened while the play was still running on Broadway, as well as the 1953 musical Wonderful Town. It also served as the basis for the 1960–1961 television sitcom of the same title.
