= Broadway Rose (panhandler) =

Broadway Rose gained notoriety in the 1940s as a panhandler in the Broadway Theater District of New York City.

== Biography ==
Anna Dym was born in approximately 1913 in Woodburn, New Jersey. (Note: There is no Woodburn in New Jersey. This might be a misprint for Woodbine or Woodbridge.) Her parents, Sam and Dora Dym, were Yiddish-speaking Jewish immigrants from the Austro-Hungarian Empire. They had five additional children. By 1920, the family had moved to 264 Grafton Street in Brooklyn, New York City, New York. Anna attended New York City's Public School 175.

=== Beginnings ===
According to the 1941 profile by Maurice Zolotow, Anna began her interest in stage when her uncle took her to the Brooklyn Orpheum to see vaudeville. Thereafter she became an autograph hunter and collector, and attended vaudeville, memorizing many routines she saw.

=== From Hound to hunter ===
According to Zolotow, her transformation occurred when she realized that theater performers were just ordinary people. She learned to tag and hound performers, dispensing well-crafted flattering phrases. After doing this for a week to Georgie Price, he offered to give her five dollars if she would stay away from him. It was the event that would create her reputation, for now she realized that she could get money by being so annoying to people, that they would give her cash to stay away.

The coming of sound films led Anna away from vaudeville to Broadway. She started panhandling on Broadway in 1929, first attaching herself to Jack Benny. With the repeal of prohibition in 1934, columnist Louis Sobol renamed Anna "Broadway Rose," after an earlier apple vendor.

=== Broadway ===
By the late 1930s, she was to be found patrolling areas of the Broadway Theater District (particularly the intersection of Broadway and 50th Street). Dressed in a disheveled manner, she would solicit money from individuals, particularly those with fame. She had become so skilled in her use of language that most performers gave her something. If refused, she would resort to threats (she was familiar with the leading theater and gossip columnists of the day), or use foul language if rebuffed. Apparently some people would tip her just to keep her away. Others considered her a good-luck charm, and looked for the opportunity to see her almost every night.

Her schedule was to arrive at Broadway by 3 p.m. and stay there until about 3 a.m., when she would go home to sleep. She woke up at 10 a.m., and would read the newspapers for articles on drama or gossip to prepare for work. Notices that were about herself she kept in scrapbooks, which numbered six by 1941.

Her panhandling must have paid off. By the time of Zolotow's 1941 article, she had been able to purchase a three-story building to house her family and other tenants in the Brownsville section of Brooklyn, New York. He disclosed that her panhandling gave her an annual income of between $10,000 to $15,000.

Each year she "adopted" a particular show, consistently hanging out by the stage door and becoming familiar with cast and crew. In 1940, the show was Hellzapoppin, and she was a feature of the show's second anniversary party.

=== Brushes with the law ===
In his profile, Zolotow said how remarkable it was that, despite her occupation, Rose was rarely ever arrested. Apparently Rose's first arrest was in 1937. In October 1941, she was convicted of disorderly conduct in front of Lindy's Restaurant at 1642 Broadway. The arresting officer said "she uses vulgarity that would make a longshoreman red in the face" and she was sentenced to 30 days in jail. On January 25, 1942, Rose was again charged with disorderly conduct. This time, Judge Morris Rothenberg said that because it was the third time she was arrested on the same charge, an institution would be the best place for her.

Perhaps due to brushes with the law, references to Broadway Rose disappear after 1944.

== In popular culture ==
In the song "Conga" from the musical Wonderful Town, by Leonard Bernstein, Betty Comden and Adolph Green, there is dialogue regarding Broadway Rose. Among numerous questions, Ruth Sherwood asks some Brazilian sailors, "What do you think of Broadway Rose?"

In the webcomic Girly, by Jackie Lesnick, a character named Broadway Rose works as a product analyst for the company HappyCo.
