= Wonderful Town =

Musical

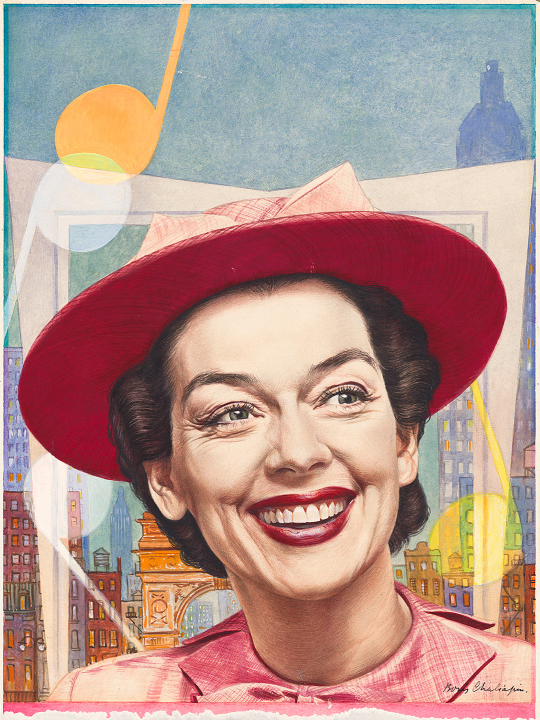
- Rosalind Russell in the original Broadway production of Wonderful Town, from the cover of Time (March 30, 1953)
- Music: Leonard Bernstein
- Lyrics: Betty Comden; Adolph Green
- Book: Joseph A. Fields; Jerome Chodorov
- Basis: Joseph A. Fields and Jerome Chodorov's play My Sister Eileen, based on Ruth McKenney's stories
- Productions: 1953 Broadway; 1955 and 1986 West End; 2003 Broadway revival 2006 Non-Equity U.S. Tour
- Awards: Tony Award for Best Musical

Wonderful Town is a 1953 musical with book written by Joseph A. Fields and Jerome Chodorov, lyrics by Betty Comden and Adolph Green, and music by Leonard Bernstein. The musical tells the story of two sisters who aspire to be a writer and actress respectively, seeking success from their basement apartment in New York City's Greenwich Village. It is based on Fields and Chodorov's 1940 play My Sister Eileen, which in turn originated from autobiographical short stories by Ruth McKenney first published in The New Yorker in the late 1930s and later published in book form as My Sister Eileen. Only the last two stories in McKenney's book were used, and they were heavily modified.

After a pre-Broadway try-out at the Forrest Theatre in Philadelphia, Wonderful Town premiered on Broadway in 1953, starring Rosalind Russell in the role of Ruth Sherwood, Edie Adams as Eileen Sherwood, and George Gaynes as Robert Baker. It won five Tony Awards, including Best Musical and Best Actress, and spawned three New York City Center productions between 1958 and 1966, the 1955 and 1986 West End production and 2003 Broadway revival. It is a lighter piece than Bernstein's later works, West Side Story and Candide, but none of the songs have become as popular.

== Synopsis ==
=== Act I ===
During the summer of 1935 in Greenwich Village, New York, a tour guide leads a group of sightseers on a tour of "Christopher Street" and its colorful residents.

When the tourists have departed, the witty Ruth Sherwood arrives in Greenwich Village with Eileen, her younger sister. The two have just arrived from Columbus, Ohio, determined to forge a life in New York City as a writer (Ruth) and an actress (Eileen). Soon they are living in a basement apartment, recently vacated by Violet. Their landlord is Mr. Appopoulos. Their apartment building is shaken frequently by dynamite from the construction of a subway underneath them and they are disturbed by Violet's returning customers. The sisters are soon stricken with homesickness for "Ohio".

The next morning, Ruth and Eileen set out to try their hand at "Conquering New York", only to find defeat and humiliation. Eileen, at least, has gotten food from a food samples man, as well as Mr. Valenti, but has also met Frank Lippencott, a local Walgreens manager who has developed a crush on her. Ruth, however, is left to wonder at her sister's magnetic appeal and her own unique romantic abilities — a talent for repelling men that is so successful that she could write a book entitled "One Hundred Easy Ways to Lose a Man."

Eventually, Ruth talks her way into the offices of a short story magazine, where she meets Bob Baker. Bob likes Ruth, but advises her that she has little chance of success, and tells her flat out what a waste of money and time it was to come to New York City, because he along with many others have done the same thing ("What a Waste"). Undaunted, Ruth leaves three stories with Bob in the hope that he will read them.

Meanwhile, Eileen has been eating all of her lunches free at Walgreens, and finds herself infatuated with Frank ("A Little Bit in Love"), and invites him over to dinner so Ruth can have free lunches when she goes to Walgreens, too. Bob arrives at the apartment, looking for Ruth, and Eileen invites him over for dinner as well. The phone rings, and it is Chick Clark, a newspaper editor, whom Eileen met in an elevator, wanting to see Eileen.

The upstairs neighbors, Wreck, an out-of-season American football player ("Pass the Football"), and his live-in lover, Helen, ask the girls to hide Wreck while Helen's mother, Mrs. Ella Wade is in town, because Mrs. Wade does not yet know about Wreck. Eileen happily agrees to stow him in their apartment, much to Ruth's hesitation. Wreck describes his lucky history as a student at Trenton Tech, who got by very well only because of his ability with football.

Eileen has invited Frank Lippencott, Bob Baker, and Chick Clark, a slimy newspaper scribe whom she has met with the object of furthering Ruth's career, over for potluck supper. Unaware of each other's feelings, both women find themselves attracted to Bob. Soon, all five of them are seated around the cramped apartment trying to fill the awkward silence ("Conversation Piece"). Meanwhile, Helen deals with her overbearing and exaggerated mother.

Ruth and Bob talk over the quality of her stories, and he advises her to write about what she knows rather than flights of fancy. Both say several wrong things, and he finally tells her off. He soon regrets it as Ruth rushes inside in tears ("A Quiet Girl").

While all this is happening, anxious to be alone with Eileen, Chick Clark creates a bogus assignment for Ruth. He sends her off to the Brooklyn Navy Yard to interview a group of Brazilian navy cadets. She quickly realizes that their sole interest is to learn and dance the "Conga!". The sailors follow Ruth home, where the girls soon find themselves in chaotic confusion, as all the citizens of Christopher Street join the conga line in a finale. Ruth runs into Bob and gives him a piece of her mind, while Eileen is hauled off to jail for causing the riot.

=== Act II ===
In the local jail Eileen finds herself practically running the place, with Officer Lonigan and his brigade of doting Irish police officers at her beck and call. Given her name, they are convinced that she is Irish. They serenade her and are not at all discouraged when she says she is not Irish ("My Darlin' Eileen"). Ruth comes to assure Eileen that she will bail her out as soon as she collects the money from her new job as a promoter for the Village Vortex, a local nightclub. At the club, Ruth digs the rhythm of swing ("Wonderful Town Swing").

Meanwhile, Wreck is awkwardly masquerading as a wealthy art collector to meet the approval of Helen's mother, and Chick is frantically calling Eileen, trying to make things right.

Thanks to Bob, Eileen is soon released from jail, and the sisters learn that Mr. Appopoulos has been so scandalized by a missing picture that he painted (that was actually stolen and sold for $2 by Helen and Wreck for Wreck to stay at the Y) as well as Eileen's arrest that he has threatened to evict them. Eileen discovers that Ruth is also attracted to Bob Baker, and the two of them wish, for a moment, that they had never left home ("Ohio" (reprise)). Eileen is then confronted by the rhythmical Speedy Valenti, owner of the Village Vortex (the night club), who arranges for her New York City debut as a singer because her fame has reached the front page of the news. Mr. Appopoulos immediately changes his tune now that one of his tenants has a paying job, and extends their lease.

Eileen soon learns that Bob Baker has quit his job as a result of a disagreement with his boss about Ruth's story on the Brazilian sailors. Eileen is thrilled that Bob quit his job and assures the unbelieving Bob that it's love that he feels for Ruth. Bob, faced with the facts, hesitantly realizes the truth that it is love ("It's Love").

The mood at the Vortex turns jazzy ("Ballet At the Village Vortex"). Eileen finds herself with a case of stage fright and she convinces Ruth to join her on stage to sing. Chick arrives to make amends and presents Ruth with a press pass: His boss has read her story about the Brazilian sailors and loved it, and given Ruth a job to take on the following Monday. The Vortex is alive with singing and dancing ("Wrong Note Rag"), and Bob decides it is the perfect moment to let Ruth know how he feels. The curtain closes as Eileen and the guests at the club sing "It's Love" along with everyone in a finale in celebration of Ruth and Bob's newfound affection.

== Musical numbers ==
Act I

- Overture — Orchestra
- Christopher Street — Tour Guide and Villagers
- Ohio — Ruth Sherwood and Eileen Sherwood
- Conquering New York — Ruth, Eileen, First Cadet, Violet and Villagers*
- One Hundred Easy Ways — Ruth
- What a Waste — Bob Baker and Associate Editors
- A Little Bit in Love — Eileen
- Pass the Football — Wreck and Villagers
- Conversation Piece — Ruth, Eileen, Frank Lippencott, Bob and Chick Clark*
- A Quiet Girl — Bob
- Quiet Ruth — Ruth
- Conga — Ruth and Brazilian Cadets

Act II

- Entr'acte — Orchestra
- My Darlin' Eileen — Eileen and Policemen
- Swing — Ruth and Villagers
- Ohio (Reprise) — Ruth and Eileen
- It's Love — Eileen, Bob and Villagers
- Ballet at the Village Vortex — Orchestra (danced by the ensemble)
- Wrong Note Rag — Ruth, Eileen and Villagers
- It's Love (Reprise) / Finale — Eileen, Bob, Ruth and Entire Company

"Conquering New York" and "Conversation Piece" both quote Bernstein's piece for solo clarinet and jazz ensemble, "Prelude, Fugue, and Riffs", premiered by Benny Goodman in 1955.

== Casts ==
=== Principal Casts ===
Character	Original Broadway Production	US National Tour	Original West End Production	City Center Revival	Brussels World's Fair Production	CBS Live Television Production	City Center Revival	City Center Revival	West End Revival	New York City Opera Production	Encores! Production	Broadway Revival	Goodman Theatre Production	Los Angeles Opera Production	Encores! Production
Character	1953-1954	1954-1955	1955	1958			1963	1967	1986	1994	2000	2003-2005	2016		2025
Ruth Sherwood	Rosalind Russell	Carol Channing	Pat Kirkwood	Nancy Walker	Mitzi Green	Rosalind Russell	Kaye Ballard	Elaine Stritch	Maureen Lipman	Kay McClelland	Donna Murphy	Donna Murphy	Bri Sudia	Faith Prince	Anika Noni Rose
Eileen Sherwood	Edie Adams	Betty Gillett	Shani Wallis	Jo Sullivan Loesser	Joan Hovis	Jacquelyn McKeever	Jacquelyn McKeever	Linda Bennett	Emily Morgan	Crista Moore	Laura Benanti	Jennifer Westfeldt	Lauren Molina	Nikki M. James	Aisha Jackson
Robert Baker	George Gaynes	George Gaynes	Dennis Bowers	Peter Cookson	Jack Cassidy	Sydney Chaplin	Robert Kaye	Nolan Van Way	Ray Lonnen	Richard Muenz	Richard Muenz	Gregg Edelman	Karl Hamilton	Marc Kudisch	Javier Muñoz
Frank Lippencott	Cris Alexander	Cris Alexander	Christopher Taylor	Cris Alexander	Jack Fletcher	Cris Alexander	Jim Kirkwood	Jack Fletcher	Ben Stevens	Don Stephenson	David Aaron Baker	Peter Benson	Wade Elkins	Jared Gertner	Etai Benson
Chick Clark	Dort Clark	Dort Clark	Colin Croft	Frank Maxwell	Robert Webber	Dort Clark	Gabriel Dell	Richard France	John Cassady	Stephen Berger	Gregory Jbara	Michael McGrath	Steven Strafford	Roger Bart	John Rapson
Appopolous	Henry Lascoe	Douglas Chandler	David Hurst	George Givot	George Tobias	Joseph Buloff	Phil Leeds	Ted Thurston	James Berwick	Larry Block	Lewis J. Stadlen	David Margulies	Matt DeCaro	Tony Abatemarco	Daniel Torres
Speedy Valenti	Ted Beniades	Ted Beniades	Stanley Robinson	Ted Beniades	Felice Orlandi	Ted Beniades	Ted Beniades	George Marcy	Robert Dallas	Carlos Lopez	Stephen DeRosa	Stanley Wayne Mathis	James Earl Jones II	Roger Bart	DeWitt Fleming Jr.
Wreck	Jordan Bentley	Warde Donovan	Sidney James	Jordan Bentley	Darren McGavin	Jordan Bentley	Stewart Rose	Jack Knight	Nicolas Colicos	Timothy Warmen	Raymond Jaramillo McLeod	Raymond Jaramillo McLeod	Jordan Brown	Ben Crawford	Fergie L. Philippe
Officer Lonigan	Walter Kelvin	Oran Osburn	Frank Wilson	Jack Rains	John Wheeler	John Wheeler	Walter Kelvin	Ronn Carroll	Peter Edbrook	Don Yule	Steve Ryan	Timothy Shew	George Andrew Wolff	Brian Michael Moore	Jimmy Ray Bennett
Mrs. Wade	Isabella Hoopes	Isabella Hoopes	Jean Stanley	Isabella Hoopes	Claire Waring	Isabella Hoopes	Paula Trueman	Claire Waring	Angela Moran	Susan Browning	Becky Ann Baker	Randy Danson	Amy J. Carle	—N/a	Allison Blackwell
Helen	Michele Burke	Marilyn Sable	Shirley Douglas	Betsy von Furstenberg	—N/a	Michele Burke	Pat Turner	Betsy von Furstenberg	Julie Jupp	Meghan Strange	Jenny Hill	Nancy Anderson	Sadieh Rifai	Julia Aks	Jessie Hooker-Bailey

==== Notable Replacements ====
Original Broadway Production (1953–1954)

- Ruth Sherwood: Carol Channing
- Frank Lippencott: Harold Prince (u/s)
- Wreck: Joe Layton (u/s)

Broadway Revival (2004–2005)

- Ruth Sherwood: Brooke Shields
- Eileen Sherwood: Jennifer Hope Wills
- Appopolous: Tom Mardirosian
- Helen: Kate Baldwin

== Production history ==
=== Original Broadway production ===
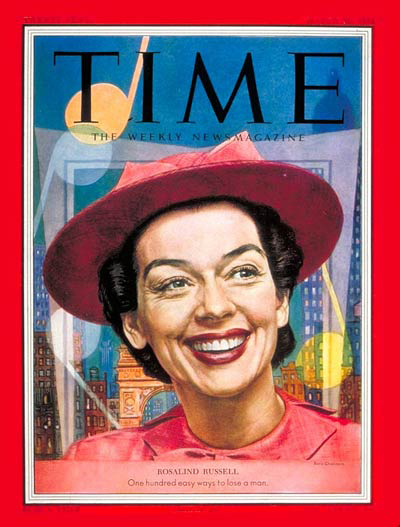
Rosalind Russell on the cover of Time (March 30, 1953)

Produced by Robert Fryer, the original production premiered at the Winter Garden Theatre on February 25, 1953, where it ran for 559 performances, closing on July 3, 1954. George Abbott served as director, with choreography by Donald Saddler. The original cast featured Rosalind Russell in the role of Ruth Sherwood, Edie Adams as Eileen Sherwood, and George Gaynes as Robert Baker. Carol Channing replaced Russell for the final 6 months of the run. Steven Suskin wrote that the show was one of only eight musicals that opened on Broadway between 1943 and 1964 to "unanimous raves from the major first-night newspaper critics".

=== Original London production ===
The West End premiere opened at The Prince's Theatre on February 25, 1955, running for 207 performances starring Pat Kirkwood as Ruth, Shani Wallis as Eileen, and Sid James as Wreck. The musical was produced by Jack Hylton with Cyril Ornadel as music director.

=== 1958 television production ===
On November 30, 1958, CBS Television broadcast a live special of the musical, with Rosalind Russell (Ruth Sherwood), Jackie McKeever (Eileen Sherwood), Sydney Chaplin (Bob Baker), and Jordan Bentley (the Wreck).

=== 2003 Broadway revival ===
Poster for the 2003 revival

In May 2000 City Center Encores! presented a staged concert starring Donna Murphy and Laura Benanti. With direction and choreography by Kathleen Marshall, the production was well received, eventually leading to a full revival. Again directed by Marshall, the 2003 Broadway Revival opened at the Al Hirschfeld Theatre on November 23, 2003, and closed on January 30, 2005 after 497 performances. Murphy reprised her role as Ruth, with Jennifer Westfeldt as Eileen and Gregg Edelman as Robert. Brooke Shields took over the role of Ruth beginning September 28, 2004. As had happened when Shields was a replacement for Rizzo in the Broadway revival of Grease, the cast album was re-released with Shields' voice replacing Murphy's.

=== Other productions ===
A West End revival starring Maureen Lipman opened at the Queen's Theatre in August 1986 and closed March 1987.

A Non-Equity National Tour was presented by Music Theatre Associates in 2006 and 2007.

Wonderful Town premiered on May 25, 2008 at the Shaw Festival in Niagara On The Lake, Ontario.

In 2012 the Hallé Concerts Society, the Royal Exchange Theatre, Manchester, and The Lowry, Salford Quays, mounted a joint production at the Lowry from 31 March to 21 April, with the Hallé Orchestra conducted by Sir Mark Elder. It then went on to tour the UK until 7 July. The cast included Connie Fisher, Lucy van Gasse and Michael Xavier. The production was directed by Braham Murray.

Mary Zimmerman directed the 2016 Goodman Theatre (Chicago) revival which previewed from September 10 to run September 20 to October 23: the cast included Bri Sudia (Ruth) Lauren Molina (Eileen), and Matt DeCaro (Appopoulos), the sets were designed by Todd Rosenthal. The production was staged with a 1950s - rather than 1930s - setting.

An off-West-End production was presented at Ye Olde Rose and Crown Theatre by All Star Productions in October 2016.

In December 2016, Staatsoperette Dresden presented the premiere of a German version (book and lyrics translated by Roman Hinze).

Opera Holland Park mounted a 2021 revival of Wonderful Town headlined by Louise Dearman as Ruth: running July 1–4, the production featured Ako Mitchell as Bob Baker.

== Recordings ==
Though there have been only two major Broadway productions of Wonderful Town, many recordings of the music have been made over the years.

- 1953: The Original Broadway Cast with Rosalind Russell as Ruth.
- 1958: The CBS TV Movie Cast with Rosalind Russell as Ruth.
- 1986: The Original London Cast with Maureen Lipman as Ruth.
- 1998: A Studio Cast recording with Karen Mason as Ruth. The first complete recording of the score, conducted by John Owen Edwards.
- 1999: A Studio Cast recording with Kim Criswell as Ruth and Audra McDonald as Eileen, with Thomas Hampson, and Rodney Gilfry. The recording is conducted by Sir Simon Rattle.
- 2002: A live performance in Berlin on DVD with Kim Criswell as Ruth and Audra McDonald as Eileen, and with Thomas Hampson and Wayne Marshall, performed by the Berlin Philharmonic and conducted by Sir Simon Rattle.
- 2003: The cast recording of a new revival with Donna Murphy and Jennifer Westfeldt as Ruth and Eileen, respectively.
- 2004: A new recording of the 2003 production, with Brooke Shields and Jennifer Hope Wills as Ruth and Eileen, respectively. For this recording, the original orchestral tracks from the New Broadway recording were used, and only Ruth and Eileen's songs were rerecorded.
- 2017: Live recording with Danielle de Niese as Eileen and Alysha Umphress as Ruth, with Nathan Gunn as Bob, performed by the London Symphony Orchestra and Chorus conducted by Sir Simon Rattle.

== Awards and nominations ==
=== Original Broadway production ===
Year	Award	Category	Nominee	Result
1953	Tony Award	Best Musical		Won
1953	Tony Award	Best Performance by a Leading Actress in a Musical	Rosalind Russell	Won
1953	Tony Award	Best Choreography	Donald Saddler	Won
1953	Tony Award	Best Conductor and Musical Director	Lehman Engel	Won
1953	Tony Award	Best Scenic Design	Raoul Pène Du Bois	Won
1953	Theatre World Award		Edie Adams	Won
1953	New York Drama Critics' Circle Awards	Best Musical	Leonard Bernstein, Betty Comden, Adolph Green, Joseph A. Fields and Jerome Chodorov	Won

=== 1986 London production ===
Year	Award	Category	Nominee	Result
1986	Laurence Olivier Award	Best New Musical		Nominated
1986	Laurence Olivier Award	Best Actress in a Musical	Maureen Lipman	Nominated

=== 2003 Broadway revival ===
Year	Award	Category	Nominee	Result
2004	Tony Award	Best Revival of a Musical		Nominated
2004	Tony Award	Best Performance by a Leading Actress in a Musical	Donna Murphy	Nominated
2004	Tony Award	Best Performance by a Featured Actress in a Musical	Jennifer Westfeldt	Nominated
2004	Tony Award	Best Direction of a Musical	Kathleen Marshall	Nominated
2004	Tony Award	Best Choreography	Kathleen Marshall	Won
2004	Drama Desk Award	Outstanding Revival of a Musical		Nominated
2004	Drama Desk Award	Outstanding Actress in a Musical	Donna Murphy	Won
2004	Drama Desk Award	Outstanding Featured Actor in a Musical	Raymond Jaramillo McLeod	Nominated
2004	Drama Desk Award	Outstanding Director of a Musical	Kathleen Marshall	Nominated
2004	Drama Desk Award	Outstanding Choreography	Kathleen Marshall	Won
2004	Drama Desk Award	Outstanding Set Design	John Lee Beatty	Nominated
2004	Theatre World Award		Jennifer Westfeldt	Won

== See also ==
- Broadway Rose (panhandler)
