= Basement apartment =

Apartment located below street level

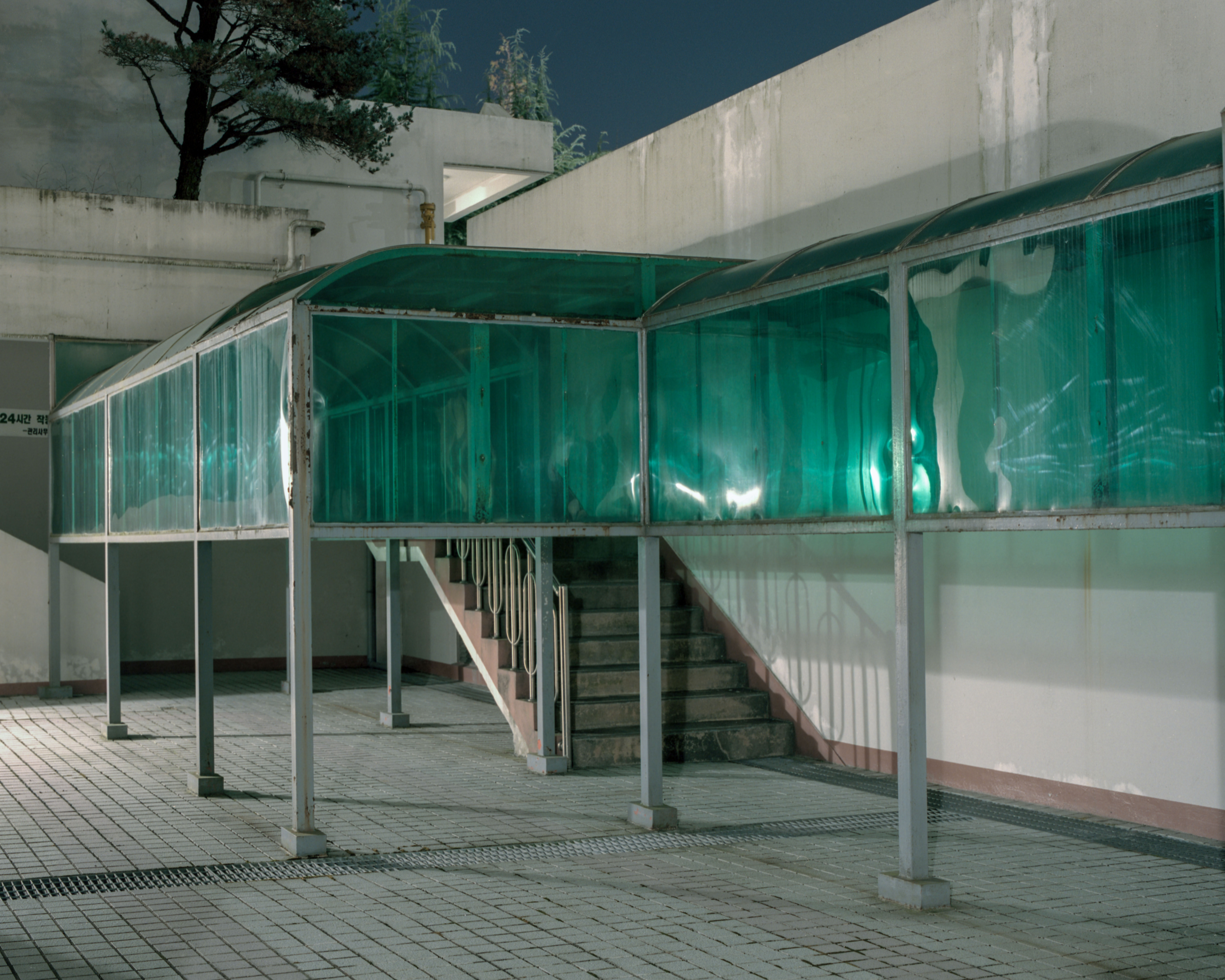
Entrance to a basement apartment in Korea.

A basement apartment or basement flat is an apartment located below street level, underneath another structure—usually an apartment building, but also homes and businesses. Cities in North America legally define them as an accessory dwelling unit or "ADU". Rent in basement apartments is usually lower than above-ground units, due to deficiencies common to basement apartments, which are often cramped, and typically noisy, especially due to passing traffic. They are also particularly vulnerable to burglary, especially those with windows at sidewalk level. In some instances, residential use of below-ground space is illegal, but practiced regardless.Owning a home with a basement apartment can be an investment, both providing an income stream and adding to the value of the property.

== Health risks ==
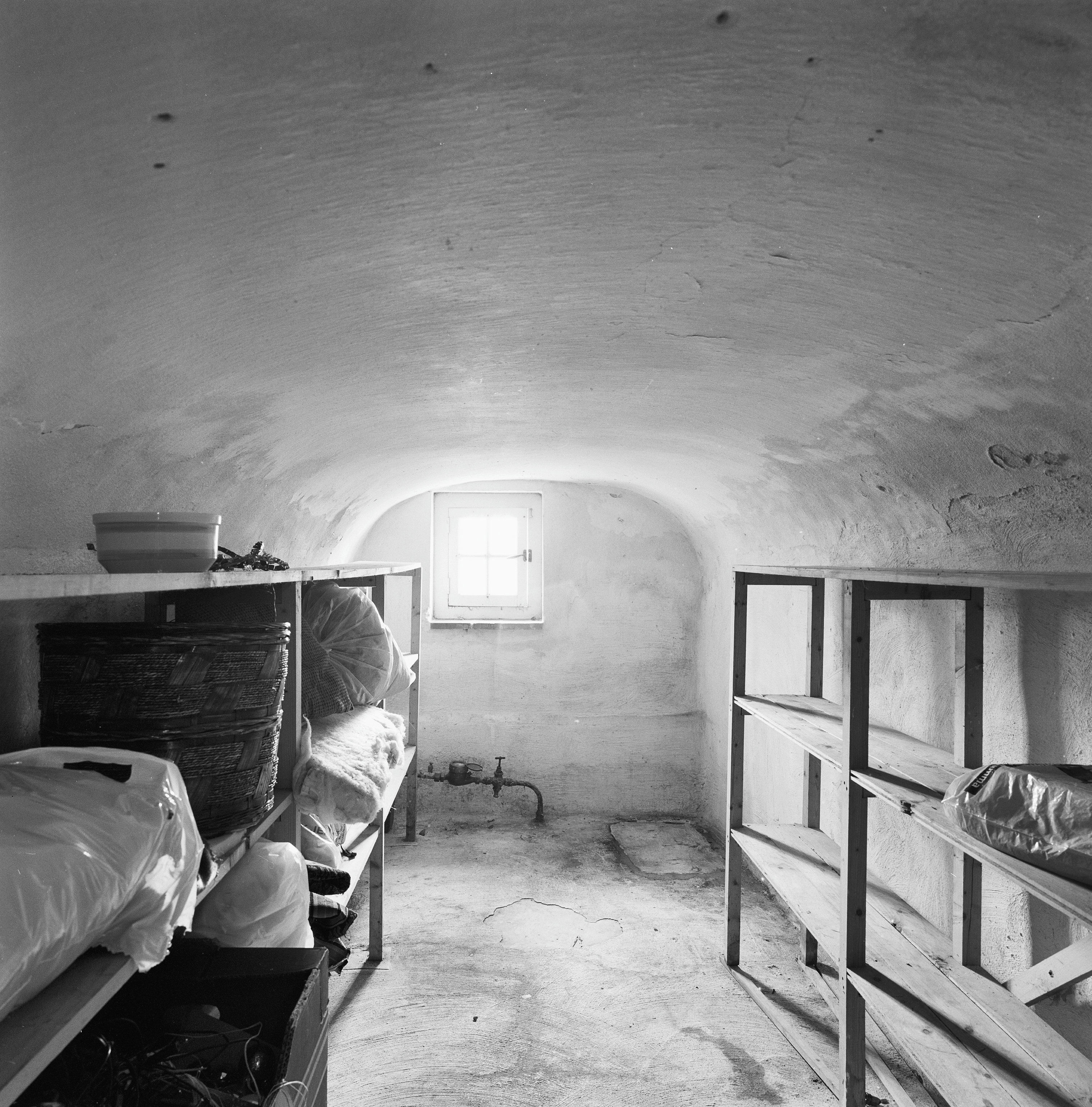
Basement in The Netherlands

Health risks of basement apartments include mold and radon. However, the risks are reflected in lower rents.

Basement apartment tenants are more likely to be injured or die due to fires. Many landlords do not follow fire code regulations, and often such regulations are not enforced by governments.

Flooding is particularly dangerous in basement apartments. When Hurricane Ida passed over the northeast of the United States, most of the deaths were caused due to flooding in basement apartments.

== In fiction ==
Ruth McKenney based a series of stories in The New Yorker, later republished in the book My Sister Eileen, on her experiences living with her sister in a moldy, one-room basement apartment, directly adjoining the Christopher Street subway station on the 1 and 2 trains, at 14 Gay Street, in Greenwich Village for which she paid $45 a month (equivalent to $1,030 in 2025). The apartment was burgled within the first week during the six months they lived there. The book was later adapted into a Hollywood movie.

A basement apartment at 5 St. Luke's Place, in New York City's Greenwich Village, serves as the setting for both the 1966 play Wait Until Dark and its 1967 film adaptation.

== See also ==
- English basement
- Penthouse apartment
