= His Honor, Homer Bell =

1955 American situation comedy series

- Genre: Sitcom
- Starring: Gene Lockhart; Mary Lee Dearring; Jane Moultrie
- Country of origin: United States
- No. of seasons: 1
- No. of episodes: 39

Production
- Producer: Himan Brown
- Running time: 30 minutes
- Production company: Galahad Productions

Original release
- Network: First-run syndication
- Release: February 24, 1955

His Honor, Homer Bell is a half-hour filmed American sitcom series made by NBC Films for first-run syndication. It starred Gene Lockhart in the title role. Thirty-nine episodes were produced by NBC in 1955. The first station that aired the series was KCOP-TV in Los Angeles, starting February 24, 1955. Station WJAC-TV in Johnstown, Pennsylvania was still running it as late as January 1961.

== Premise ==
Homer Bell (Gene Lockhart) is both an elected judge and a practising attorney in midwestern Spring City. He is a middle-aged widower, who is guardian to his orphaned niece, fifteen year-old Cassandra "Casey" Bell (Mary Lee Dearring). They are both looked after by the housekeeper-cook Maude (Jane Moultrie). Casey is a tomboy whose efforts to help her uncle often backfire. Maude is a superb cook, who is often recruited to change employers. Homer Bell, well regarded by his constituents, nevertheless finds himself landing in situations which might compromise their good will. He also can't resist helping anyone who seeks his aid.

== Production ==
Despite its supposed midwestern setting, the series was produced by Galahad Productions (Note: The production company's name is also given as "Gallahad" in some sources.) at the NBC Films studio in Brooklyn. Himan Brown was the producer for Galahad; he also directed some episodes. Other directors included Derwin Abbe and Will Price. There was no pilot episode as such, since NBC produced it for syndication. The show started filming in late 1954; by mid-January 1955 NBC felt confident enough to advertise the 39 episode package of shows in a trade paper. Midwood High School in Brooklyn was used for exterior shots of the Spring City courthouse.

== Reception ==
There was very little critical response to this show, not unusual for a syndicated series without a major star. Critic Allen Rich said it was "much ado about nothing".

== Broadcast history ==
The first episode broadcast was on Thursday, February 24, 1955, by KCOP-TV in Los Angeles. The initial sponsor at KCOP-TV and other West Coast cities was the Union Pacific Railroad. Within a month, stations in Nebraska, Texas, Oregon, and Washington had started showing it. Since it was syndicated, stations ran it on different days of the week, and at various times, usually before or after network programming in the evening. Since there was no continuity between episodes, stations ran them in whichever sequence suited them.

=== Episodes ===
For clarity, "Original Air Date" is based on the first major broadcaster of the series, KCOP Channel 13 in Los Angeles. Episode titles and summaries are accurate where given but incomplete, and possibly out of original air date sequence. Cast lists are unknown save for one episode.

No. overall	No. in season	Title	Directed by	Written by	Original release date
1	1	"This Old House"	Unknown	Unknown	February 24, 1955
Cousin Edwin is on his annual visit with schemes to fix up the Bell home. Cast: Parker Fennelly
2	2	"The Driver's License"	Unknown	Ed Jurist	March 3, 1955
Judge Bell forgets to renew his driver's license then gets stopped by cop. Cast:
3	3	TBA	Unknown	Unknown	March 10, 1955
With Maude away, Casey tries to make dinner for the Governor. Cast:
4	4	"Homer's Birthday"	Derwin Abbe	Ed Jurist	March 17, 1955
Cast: Staato Cotsworth, Bill Zuckert, Bill Martell
5	5	"The Man She Loved"	Unknown	Ed Jurist	March 24, 1955
Homer Bell hears an old flame is in town so he hides out. Cast:
6	6	TBA	Unknown	Unknown	March 31, 1955
Cast:
7	7	"The Courtship"	Unknown	Unknown	April 7, 1955
Judge thinks Casey wants a mom so he decides to go wooing. Cast:
8	8	"Cooknappers"	Unknown	Unknown	April 14, 1955
Judge invites friends for dinner but they try to steal Maude from him. Cast:
9	9	TBA	Unknown	Unknown	April 21, 1955
A dog joins the Bell household causing commotion. Cast:
10	10	TBA	Unknown	Unknown	April 28, 1955
Cast:
11	11	"Aunt Kathryn"	Unknown	Unknown	May 6, 1955 (Note: The series shifted on KCOP-TV from Thursday to Friday)
The Bell household is visited by Aunt Kathryn. Cast:
12	12	"Casey at the Bat!"	Unknown	Ed Jurist	May 13, 1955
Local women protest when Casey is kicked off the boys' baseball team. Cast:
13	13	TBA	Unknown	Unknown	May 20, 1955
Cast:
14	14	TBA	Unknown	Unknown	May 27, 1955
Cast:
15	15	"Timmy"	Unknown	Unknown	June 3, 1955
Cast:
16	16	TBA	Unknown	Unknown	June 10, 1955
Cast:
17	17	TBA	Unknown	Unknown	June 17, 1955
Cast:
18	18	TBA	Unknown	Unknown	June 24, 1955
Cast:
19	19	TBA	Unknown	Unknown	July 1, 1955
Cast:
20	20	TBA	Unknown	Unknown	July 8, 1955
Cast:
21	21	TBA	Unknown	Unknown	July 15, 1955
Cast:
22	22	TBA	Unknown	Unknown	July 22, 1955
Cast:
23	23	TBA	Unknown	Unknown	July 29, 1955
Cast:
24	24	TBA	Unknown	Unknown	August 5, 1955
Cast:
25	25	TBA	Unknown	Unknown	August 12, 1955
Cast:
26	26	TBA	Unknown	Unknown	August 19, 1955
Cast:
27	27	TBA	Unknown	Unknown	August 26, 1955
Cast:
28	28	TBA	Unknown	Unknown	September 2, 1955
Cast:
29	29	"School Play"	Unknown	Unknown	September 9, 1955
Trying to help Casey's school play, Homer gets stuck in a suit of armor. Cast:
30	30	TBA	Unknown	Unknown	September 16, 1955
Judge must settle dispute between pretty young gal and snobbish woman. Cast:
31	31	TBA	Unknown	Unknown	September 23, 1955
Cast:
32	32	TBA	Unknown	Unknown	September 30, 1955
Judge hosts party at which friend unexpectedly doesn't announce engagement. Cast:
33	33	TBA	Unknown	Unknown	October 7, 1955
Cast:
34	34	"The Shutterbug"	Unknown	Unknown	October 14, 1955
Cast:
35	35	"Red Tape"	Unknown	Unknown	October 23, 1955 (Note: The series shifted on KCOP-TV from Friday to Sunday)
The Judge gets entangled in official forms and documents Cast:
36	36	"Aunt Catherine Story"	Unknown	Unknown	October 30, 1955
The Judge once again gets caught up in unwanted marriage plans. Cast:
37	37	"Substitute Sitter"	Unknown	Unknown	November 7, 1955
Casey can't keep babysitting date so Homer substitutes for her. Cast:
38	38	"Equal Justice"	Unknown	Unknown	November 14, 1955
Cast:
39	39	"The Farm"	Unknown	Unknown	November 21, 1955
Cast:
