= Jo Ann Sayers =

American actress (1918–2011)

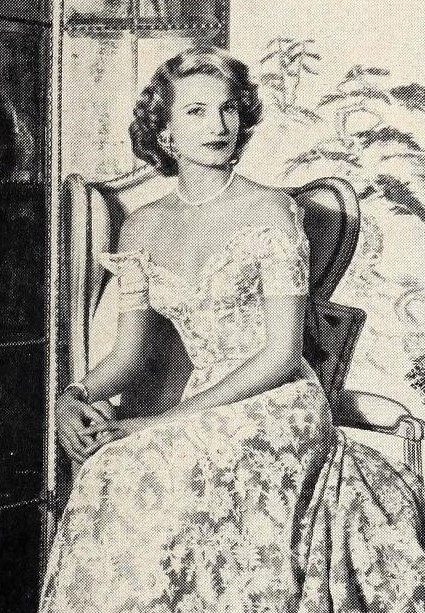
- Ann Sayers in 1954
- Born: Miriam Lucille Lilygren; October 22, 1918; Seattle, Washington, U.S.
- Died: November 14, 2011 (aged 93); Princeton, New Jersey, U.S.
- Education: University of Washington
- Occupation: Actress
- Years active: 1938–1953
- Spouses: Anthony A. Bliss (m. 1942; div. 1967) Charles K. Agle (m. 1968; died 1987)
- Children: 3

Jo Ann Sayers (born Miriam Lucille Lilygren, October 22, 1918 – November 14, 2011) was an American actress who was active on Broadway and in Hollywood films. Her film career spanned the 1930s through the 1950s.

== Biography ==
Sayers was born in Seattle, Washington. She was a budding actress as a child, participating in dances, taking piano and violin lessons, and acting in school plays. She enrolled in Pre-law at the University of Washington, also taking drama classes. A talent scout noted her in a student production and invited her to Hollywood for a screen test. She was offered a contract with Metro-Goldwyn-Mayer. Her first credited film role was in 1938.

In 1940, she was selected for the titular role in the Broadway production of My Sister Eileen, opposite Shirley Booth, who was two decades Sayers' senior, which opened on December 26, 1940.

== Marriages ==
She remained in the Broadway cast until June 1942, when she left to marry Anthony A. Bliss, a New York lawyer and patron of the performing arts.

They married on June 10, 1942, and had three children, but later divorced. Sayers later worked in summer theater, radio and television. She married a second time in 1968 to architect Charles K. Agle; they remained together until his death in Princeton, New Jersey.

== Death ==
Sayers died on November 14, 2011, aged 93, in Princeton, New Jersey.

== Selected filmography ==
- Main Street to Broadway (1953) (uncredited) .... Bride in Musical Number
- The Light of the Western Stars (1940) .... Majesty Hammond
- The Man With Nine Lives (1940) .... Nurse Judith Blair
- Drunk Driving (1939) .... Mrs. Jones
- The Women (1939) (uncredited) .... Debutante
- Fast and Loose (1939) .... Christina 'Chris' Torrent
- Honolulu (1939) .... Nurse
- The Adventures of Huckleberry Finn (1939) .... Susan
- Young Dr. Kildare (1938) .... Barbara
