= Barbara Whiting =

American actress and singer (1931–2004)

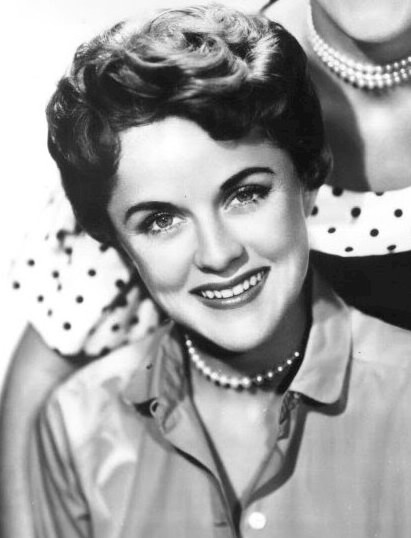
- Whiting in 1955
- Born: May 19, 1931; Los Angeles, California, U.S.
- Died: June 9, 2004 (aged 73); Pontiac, Michigan, U.S.
- Other name: Barbara Whiting Smith
- Occupations: Actress; Singer
- Years active: 1945–1957
- Spouse: Gail Smith (m. 1959; died 1991)
- Children: 1
- Father: Richard A. Whiting
- Relatives: Margaret Whiting (sister)

Barbara Whiting Smith (May 19, 1931 – June 9, 2004) was an American actress and singer.

== Early life ==
Whiting was born in Los Angeles, California, the daughter of music manager Eleanor Youngblood Whiting and composer Richard A. Whiting. Her older sister was singer Margaret Whiting.

== Career ==
Her movie career began with the 1945 film, Junior Miss, a movie based on her popular radio show by the same name. This was followed by nine other starring roles until she married Gail Smith and retired.

On television, she co-starred with her sister, Margaret in Those Whiting Girls on CBS. The program debuted July 4, 1955, as a summer replacement for I Love Lucy.

Whiting's radio career was what she was most known for during her lifetime. In 1948 she began to star in CBS's Junior Miss. It was one of the most successful radio shows of the time especially with younger audiences.

On February 8, 1960, Barbara was honored with a star at 6443 Hollywood Boulevard, in the television section of the Hollywood Walk of Fame.

== Personal life and death ==
On May 7, 1959, Whiting married Gail Smith, an advertising professional. It was her first marriage and his second. They had a son, Richard Whiting Smith.

Barbara was a "longtime volunteer" at St. Joseph Mercy Oakland Hospital, Pontiac, Michigan. She lived a quiet life, dedicated to her son Richard.

Whiting died of cancer, in Pontiac, Michigan, aged 73, June 9, 2004. She was survived by her sister and a son.

== Filmography ==
=== Select film credits ===
- Junior Miss (1945) - Fuffy Adams
- Centennial Summer (1946) - Susanna Rogers
- Home, Sweet Homicide (1946) - Jo-Ella Holbrook
- Carnival in Costa Rica (1947) - Maria Molina
- City Across the River (1949) - Annie Kane
- I Can Get It for You Wholesale (1951) - Ellen Cooper
- Beware, My Lovely (1952) - Ruth Williams
- Rainbow 'Round My Shoulder (1952) - Suzy Milligan
- Dangerous When Wet (1953) - Suzie Higgins
- Paris Follies of 1956 (1955) (with sister Margaret Whiting) - Barbara Walton

=== Select television appearances ===
- The Ed Sullivan Show
- Starlight Theatre (1950)
- The Bigelow Theatre (1951)
- Dragnet (1954)
- The Public Defender (1954) - Elly Black / Torry
- Those Whiting Girls - Desilu Studios (1955-1957) (TV serial)
- Fireside Theatre (1955) - Marian
- The Jimmy Durante Show (1955) - Herself - Suzy the Hatcheck Girl
- TV Reader's Digest (1956) - Birdie
- The Tennessee Ernie Ford Show (1956) - Herself - Singer
- Men of Annapolis (1957) - Willie (Wilhelmina)

=== Select radio credits ===
- Hollywood Star Time
- Meet Corliss Archer
- The Screen Guild Theater
- The Great Gildersleeve
- Family Theater
- The Bing Crosby Show
- Escape
- The Railroad Hour
- Suspense
- Broadway Is My Beat
- On Stage
- Yours Truly, Johnny Dollar
