= Allyn Joslyn =

American character actor

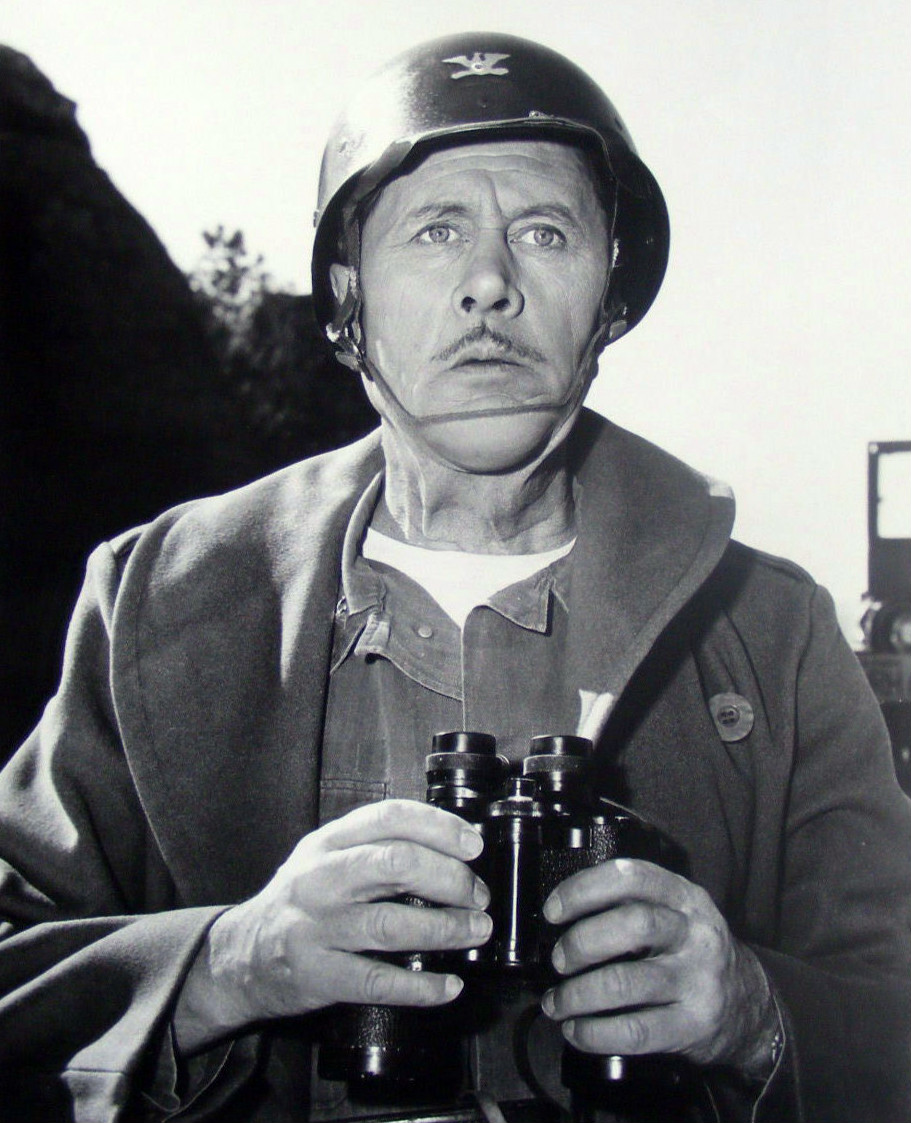
- Joslyn in McKeever and the Colonel
- Born: Allyn Morgan Joslyn; July 21, 1901; Milford, Pennsylvania, U.S.
- Died: January 21, 1981 (aged 79); Motion Picture Hospital; Woodland Hills, California, US
- Resting place: Forest Lawn Memorial Park; Hollywood Hills, California, US
- Occupation: Actor
- Years active: 1907—1980
- Spouse: Dorothy Yockel (1935-1978) (her death)
- Children: 1

Allyn Morgan Joslyn (July 21, 1901 – January 21, 1981) was an American character actor of theatre, radio, film and television, specializing in comic roles.

== Early life and career ==
Born in Milford, Pennsylvania Joslyn was the son of Orlando West Joslyn Jr. and Gertrude Meyer. He studied drama with Professor E. C. Durfee at Chestnut Hill Academy in Philadelphia and later attended Columbia University.

By 1921, Joslyn had joined the Greenwich Village Follies.

It was his acclaimed performance as Robert Law—a character reputedly modeled on screenwriter Charles MacArthur—in the 1935 hit Broadway comedy Boy Meets Girl that first caught Hollywood producer-director Mervyn LeRoy's eye, leading to Joslyn making his 1937 screen debut, alongside that of Lana Turner, in LeRoy's They Won't Forget.

== Personal life and death ==
One of Joslyn's great-uncles was the former governor of New York, Edwin D. Morgan.

From 1935 until his death in 1978, Joslyn was married to Dorothy Yockel, Philadelphia-born stage and radio actress—and fellow fishing enthusiast—with whom he had frequently co-starred during the late 1920s. Their union produced one child, a daughter.

On January 21, 1981, at age 79, Joslyn died of heart failure at the Motion Picture & Television Country House and Hospital in Woodland Hills, Los Angeles. Predeceased by his wife, he was survived by his daughter. His remains are interred at Forest Lawn Memorial Park in the Hollywood Hills section of Los Angeles.

== Selected filmography ==
=== Film ===
- They Won't Forget (1937) as Bill Brock
- Expensive Husbands (1938) as Joe Craig
- Sweethearts (1938) as Dink
- Cafe Society (1939) as Sonny De Witt
- Only Angels Have Wings (1939) as Les Peters
- The Great McGinty (1940) as George
- No Time for Comedy (1940) as Morgan Carrel
- This Thing Called Love (1940) as Harry Bertrand
- I Wake Up Screaming (1941) as Larry Evans
- Bedtime Story (1941) as William Dudley
- The Wife Takes a Flyer (1942) as Major Zellfritz
- Immortal Sergeant (1943) as Cassidy
- Young Ideas (1943) as Adam Trent
- Heaven Can Wait (1943) as Albert Van Cleve
- Dangerous Blondes (1943) as Barry Craig
- The Impostor (1944) as Bouteau
- Bride by Mistake (1944) as Phil Vernon
- Strange Affair (1944) as Bill Harrison
- The Horn Blows at Midnight (1945)
- Junior Miss (1945) as Harry Graves
- It Shouldn't Happen to a Dog (1946) as Henry Barton
- The Thrill of Brazil (1946) as John Habour
- If You Knew Susie (1948) as Mike Garrett
- Moonrise (1948) as Sheriff Clem Otis
- Harriet Craig (1950) as Billy Birkmire
- As Young as You Feel (1951) as George Hodges
- I Love Melvin (1953) as Frank Schneider
- Titanic (1953) as Earl Meeker
- Island in the Sky (1953) as J.H. Handy
- The Fastest Gun Alive (1956) as Harvey Maxwell

=== Television ===
- The Eve Arden Show (1957-1958) (9 episodes) as George Howell
- Alfred Hitchcock Presents (1959) (Season 4 Episode 22: "The Right Price") as Mort Barnhardt
- Gunsmoke (1960) (Season 5 Episode 31: "I Thee Wed") as Sam
- Have Gun - Will Travel (1961) (Season 4 Episode 23: "The Fatal Flaw") as Marshal Lyle McKendrick
- The Untouchables (1962) (Season 3 Episode 14: "Silent Partner") as Wallace Laughton
- Target: The Corruptors (1962) (Season 1 Episode 29: A Book of Faces") as Frank Brandon
- McKeever and the Colonel (1962-1963) (26 episodes) as Colonel Harvey T. Blackwell
- Bob Hope Presents the Chrysler Theatre (1964) (Season 1 Episode 18: "The Square Peg") as Keegan
- Rawhide (1964) (Season 6 Episode 25: "Incident of the Banker") as Albert Ashton-Warner
- My Three Sons (1964) (Season 5 Episode 6: "One of Our Moose is Missing") as George Summers
- The Addams Family (1964) (Season 1 Episode 1: "The Addams Family Goes to School") as Mr. Hilliard
- The Addams Family (1964) (Season 1 Episode 4: "Gomez, the Politician") as Mr. Hilliard
- F Troop (1965) (Season 1 Episode 16: "Iron Horse Go Home") as Colonel Parmenter
- Ben Casey (1965) (Season 5 Episode 11: "When Givers Prove Unkind") as Alec Bateman
- The Addams Family (1966) (Season 2 Episode 25: "Addams Cum Laude") as Sam Hilliard
