= Ruth McKenney =

American author and journalist

- Born: Ruth Marguerite McKenney; November 18, 1911; Mishawaka, Indiana, United States
- Died: July 25, 1972 (aged 60); New York City, New York, USA
- Other name: Ruth McKenney Bransten (married name)
- Occupations: Author, journalist

Ruth Marguerite McKenney (November 18, 1911 – July 25, 1972) was an American author and journalist, best remembered for My Sister Eileen, a memoir of her experiences growing up in Ohio and moving to Greenwich Village with her sister Eileen McKenney.

Originally published as a series of short stories in The New Yorker, My Sister Eileen was published in book form in 1938, and later adapted under the same name into a play, a radio play (and unproduced radio series), two films, and a CBS television series. It was also the basis for the Leonard Bernstein musical Wonderful Town.

== Early life ==
Ruth Marguerite McKenney was born in Mishawaka, Indiana, on November 18, 1911, to John Sidney McKenney, a mechanical engineer and Marguerite Flynn, a grade school teacher. Her younger sister, Eileen (born April 3, 1913), later married the author Nathanael West.

In 1919 her family moved to East Cleveland, Ohio, where she lived until adulthood. She attended East Cleveland Evangelical Church.

She graduated from Shaw High School, where she skipped two grades. Among other subjects, she studied French. She was known as something of a tomboy and was the only girl to play on the East Cleveland boys baseball team (she played first base). She joined the Northern Ohio Debating League. She described herself as "homely as a mud fence", especially compared to her sister Eileen, though she likely exaggerated for comic effect. She also stuttered.

She attempted to commit suicide once during high school but was rescued by Eileen. At the age of 14, she ran away from home, worked as a printer's devil, and joined the International Typographical Union. At 16, she and Eileen got jobs as waitresses at the Harvey Tea Room at the Cleveland Union Station.

She attended Ohio State University from 1928 to 1931, majoring in journalism, but did not graduate. Early in her college career, she and her grandmother ran a small business writing homework papers for football players, wrestlers, and other students. She also wrote for the student newspaper, the Ohio State Lantern; and was the campus correspondent for the Columbus Dispatch.

== Career ==
While in college, McKenney worked part-time for the Columbus Citizen. She also contributed to the International News Service. Following this, she became a full-time reporter for the Akron Beacon Journal.

In 1934, McKenney moved to New Jersey, where she joined the staff of the Newark Ledger. From there, she and Eileen moved to New York City, specifically a moldy, one-room basement apartment near Sheridan Square at 14 Gay Street in Greenwich Village, for which she paid $45 a month (equivalent to $1,030 in 2025) The apartment was burgled within the first week of the six months they lived there. The apartment would become the setting of a series of stories in The New Yorker, later republished in book form as My Sister Eileen (1938).

In 1939 McKenney published Industrial Valley, a then-controversial book about the Akron rubber strike (1932–36). She considered it her best work. Her best-selling novel Jake Home (1943) chronicled the struggles of some common Americans between 1900 and 1930.

== Adaptations of McKenney's works ==
McKenney's story collection My Sister Eileen has been adapted a number of times for stage, film and television. In 1940, Joseph A. Fields and Jerome Chodorov first adapted My Sister Eileen for Broadway, focusing mostly on the last two chapters of the book detailing Ruth and Eileen's young adult experiences in New York City. (The book mostly concerns their childhood in East Cleveland.) The play opened on December 26, 1940 (four days after the death of the Eileen of the title), and ran until January 16, 1943. A film adaptation was made in 1942, directed by Alexander Hall and starring Rosalind Russell as Ruth.

Fields and Chodorov later adapted their play My Sister Eileen as the musical Wonderful Town, with lyrics by Betty Comden and Adolph Green and music by Leonard Bernstein, and starring Rosalind Russell and Edie Adams. It opened on Broadway on February 25, 1953, and ran for 559 performances until July 3, 1954. Since then it has been periodically revived both on and off Broadway.

In 1945, McKenney and her husband Richard Bransten wrote a script titled "Maggie," which was based on her girlhood stories as collected in My Sister Eileen and The McKenneys Carry On. The final script was written by F. Hugh Herbert, produced by 20th Century-Fox, and released as Margie in 1946. The film was later adapted for television in the early 1960s.

In 1955 a second musical film based on McKenney's childhood stories was written and directed by Richard Quine and starred Betty Garrett, Janet Leigh, and Jack Lemmon, featuring all original songs (none of the Wonderful Town music was used). In 1960–61, My Sister Eileen was adapted as a television series that ran for 26 episodes.

In 1956, John Boruff adapted McKenney's novel The Loud Red Patrick for Broadway. It ran for 93 performances from October 3 to December 22 and soon became a favorite of regional theaters.

== Personal life ==
In 1937, McKenney married fellow writer Richard Bransten (pen name Bruce Minton). McKenney and Bransten were both Communists. According to Time Magazine, McKinney wrote in 1940, describing the outbreak of World War II: "The Second Imperialist War ... is a fight among thieves, a bloody quarrel among the vultures." They were purged from the party in 1946, but McKinney insisted that despite that, "both of us consider ourselves loyal members of the Communist Party."

They had a son Paul and a daughter Eileen, named in memory of Ruth's sister. Eileen Bransten was a New York State Supreme Court justice in Manhattan.

In 1939, Ruth's sister Eileen married novelist Nathanael West. Eileen had been an ink-and-paint artist at Walt Disney Studios and was just 27 when she died in a road accident on December 22, 1940, two years after My Sister Eileen was published and four days before its first stage version opened on Broadway. West, who had run a stop sign, also died in the same accident. "My mother never quite recovered from her sister's death", Eileen Bransten noted.

On November 18, 1955, Ruth McKenney's 44th birthday, her husband Richard Bransten committed suicide in London.

After this, Ruth returned to New York City, but stopped writing. Ruth McKenney Bransten died in New York on July 25, 1972, aged 60. She had suffered from heart disease and diabetes.

== Books and other works ==
McKenney wrote 10 fiction and non-fiction books. They are:

- My Sister Eileen (1938), a short story collection about Ruth McKenney and her sister Eileen's experiences growing up in Ohio and then moving to New York City
- Industrial Valley (1939), a novel about the Akron rubber strike from 1932 to 1936
- The McKenneys Carry On (1940), another collection of short stories about Ruth and her sister, which might be understood as the sequel to My Sister Eileen
- Jake Home (1943)
- The Loud Red Patrick (1947), a collection of stories about an Irish widower raising four daughters in Cleveland, based on her grandfather
- Love Story (1950), the story of her marriage to Richard Bransten
- Here's England, a Highly Informal Guide (1951) with husband Richard Bransten
- All About Eileen (1952), the second sequel to My Sister Eileen, a collection of previously published and new stories about her sister and herself
- Far, Far from Home (1954), a humorous account of her family's two-year residence in Brussels
- Mirage (1956), an historical novel set in Napoleonic France and Egypt

She wrote numerous short pieces for a variety of publications, including Harper's, The New Yorker, the New York Post, Ellery Queen's Mystery Magazine, Collier's, Argosy, Woman's Journal, Encore, The Saturday Evening Post, Holiday and New Masses. She also wrote screenplays with her husband, including Margie and The Trouble with Women.
