= Joseph Fields =

American playwright, theatre director, screenwriter, film producer (1895–1966)

- Born: February 21, 1895; New York City, New York
- Died: March 4, 1966 (aged 71); Beverly Hills, California
- Occupations: Playwright, screenwriter, film producer, director
- Spouse: Marion
- Parent: Lew Fields
- Relatives: Dorothy Fields (sister); Herbert Fields (brother)

Joseph Albert Fields (February 21, 1895 – March 4, 1966) was an American playwright, theatre director, screenwriter, and film producer.

== Life and career ==
Fields was born in New York City, the son of vaudevillean Lew Fields. He graduated from DeWitt Clinton High School and attended New York University before enrolling in the American Expeditionary Force during World War I, after which he remained in Paris until 1922 working in the perfume business. He moved to Los Angeles in 1930, and his early writing career was spent churning out screenplays for mostly B-movies, beginning with The Big Shot in 1931.

Fields made his Broadway debut in 1938 with the play Schoolhouse on the Lot, co-written with Jerome Chodorov, who became a frequent collaborator. The prolific pair went on to write My Sister Eileen (1940, based on Ruth McKenney's semi-autobiographical stories), Junior Miss (1941, based on Sally Benson's stories), The French Touch (1945), Wonderful Town (1953, based on Ruth McKenney's semi-autobiographical stories), The Girl in Pink Tights (1954), Anniversary Waltz (1954), and The Ponder Heart (1956). They also wrote the screenplay for the 1942 film adaptation of My Sister Eileen.

With Anita Loos, Fields wrote the book for the Jule Styne musical Gentlemen Prefer Blondes, and he collaborated with Oscar Hammerstein II on the book for Flower Drum Song. He also co-produced and wrote the screen adaptation of the latter, garnering a Writers Guild of America Award nomination for Best Written American Musical.

Fields won the Tony Award for Best Musical for Wonderful Town and was nominated in the same category for Flower Drum Song.

As a director, Fields helmed Arthur Miller's The Man Who Had All the Luck (1944), his own plays I Gotta Get Out (1947) and The Tunnel of Love (1957), and The Desk Set (1955).

Fields was the brother of writer/lyricist Dorothy and writer Herbert. He died in Beverly Hills; according to his obituary in The New York Times, "Joseph Fields...died here last night...Mr. Fields lived in New York but was wintering in California when he died."
