= Jerome Chodorov =

American playwright and librettist (1911–2004)

- Born: August 10, 1911; New York City, New York, U.S.
- Died: September 12, 2004 (aged 93); Nyack, New York, U.S.
- Spouse: Rhea Chodorov
- Relatives: Edward Chodorov (brother)

Jerome Chodorov (August 10, 1911 – September 12, 2004) was an American playwright, librettist, and screenwriter. He co-wrote the book with Joseph A. Fields for the original Broadway musical Wonderful Town starring Rosalind Russell. The musical was based on short stories by Ruth McKenney.

== Biography ==
Chodorov was born in New York City, and entered journalism in the 1930s. He is best known for his 1940 play My Sister Eileen, its 1942 screen adaptation, and the musical Wonderful Town, which was based on his play. Joseph A. Fields was his frequent collaborator. The writing team also adapted Sally Benson's short stories as the play Junior Miss, which was later adapted as a play and a TV musical. Chodorov was Hollywood blacklisted during the McCarthy era. he died in Nyack New York on September 12, 2004, of uremia at 93

His brother, Edward Chodorov (1904–1988), was also a playwright, author of the perennial favorite of amateur groups, Kind Lady.

== Works ==
Sources: Playbill; Doollee

=== Plays ===
- Schoolhouse on the Lot (1938)
- My Sister Eileen (1940)
- Junior Miss (1941)
- Those Endearing Young Charms (1943)
- The French Touch (1945)
- Anniversary Waltz (1954)
- The Ponder Heart (1956)
- Three Bags Full (1966)
- A Talent for Murder (with Norman Panama) (Edgar Award, 1982, Best Play)

=== Musicals ===
- Wonderful Town (Tony Award for Best Musical, 1953)
- I Had a Ball
- The Girl in Pink Tights

=== Work as theatre director ===
- Alive and Kicking (revue, 1950) – additional material
- The Gazebo (1958) – director
- Make A Million (1958) – director
- Christine (1960) – director
- Blood, Sweat and Stanley Poole (1961), director

=== Film ===
- The Case of the Lucky Legs (a 1935 Perry Mason film)
- Louisiana Purchase (1941)
- My Sister Eileen (1942)
- Junior Miss (1945)
- Those Endearing Young Charms (1945; based on his play)
- Happy Anniversary (1959), based on Anniversary Waltz
