= Ruth Storey =

American actress (1913–1997)

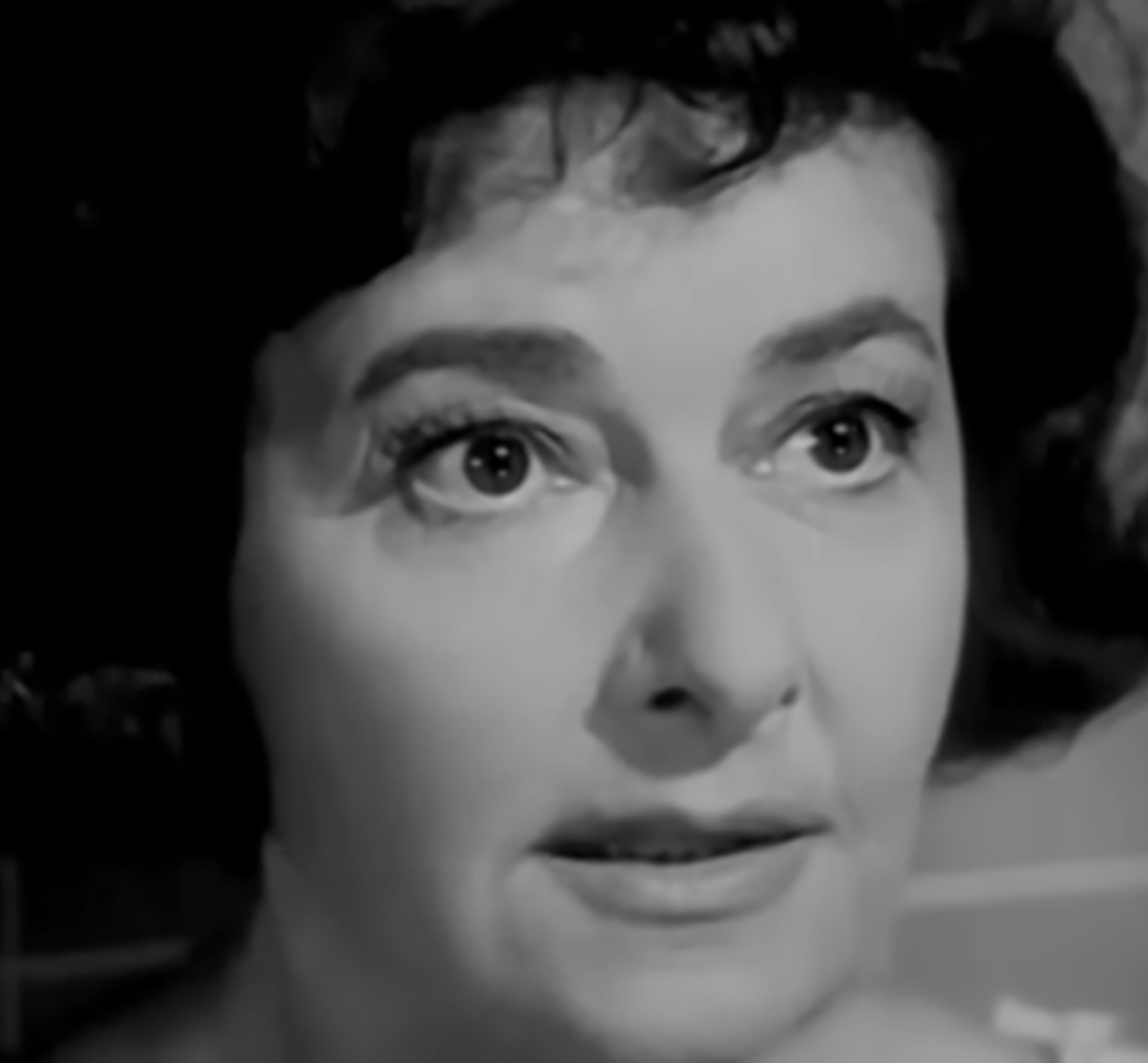
- Storey in an episode of One Step Beyond (1960)
- Born: Ruth Stromberg; January 12, 1913; Brooklyn, New York, U.S.
- Died: August 22, 1997 (aged 84); Los Angeles, California, U.S.
- Resting place: Westwood Village Memorial Park Cemetery
- Occupation(s): Actress, psychotherapist
- Years active: 1953–1981
- Spouse: Richard Conte (m. 1943; div. 1963)
- Children: 1

Ruth Storey (born Ruth Stromberg; January 12, 1913 – August 22, 1997) was an American actress and the first wife of actor Richard Conte. After retiring from acting, she became a psychotherapist.

== Personal life ==
Storey was married to actor Richard Conte, with whom she adopted a son, film editor Mark Conte. In 1950, Conte and Storey were living at 1366 San Ysidro Drive in Beverly Hills. They divorced in 1963.

== Death ==
Storey died August 30, 1997, aged 84. She is buried in the Westwood Memorial Park in Los Angeles.

== Filmography ==
=== Film ===
- The Blue Gardenia (1953) as Rose Miller
- Slaves of Babylon (1953) as Rachel
- I'll Cry Tomorrow (1955) as Marge Belney (uncredited)
- The Buccaneer (1958) (uncredited)
- Bells Are Ringing (1960) as Gwynne
- The Subterraneans (1960) as Analyst
- In Cold Blood (1967) as Bonnie Clutter
- Rich and Famous (1981) as Malibu Party Guest (final film role)

=== Television ===
- The 20th Century Fox Hour (1956) as Woman Juror
- Climax! (1956)
- Have Gun – Will Travel (1957) as Clara Benson
- Alcoa Theatre (1958) as Miss Kalish
- Alfred Hitchcock Presents (1959–1962) as Mrs. Cheever/Evelyn Wilson
- One Step Beyond (1960) as Florence DiNovio
- The Loretta Young Show (1960) as Jeanette Unten
- The Donna Reed Show (1961) as Nora
- Ben Casey (1961) as Leona Romano
- 87th Precinct (1961–1962) as Sarah Meyer
- The Eleventh Hour (1962) as Mrs. Radwin
- Peyton Place (1968) as Dr. Lodge
- Awake and Sing! (1972, TV film) as Bessie Berger
- The Streets of San Francisco (1972) as Mrs. Ruthie Rosselli
