= Richard Conte =

American actor (1910–1975)

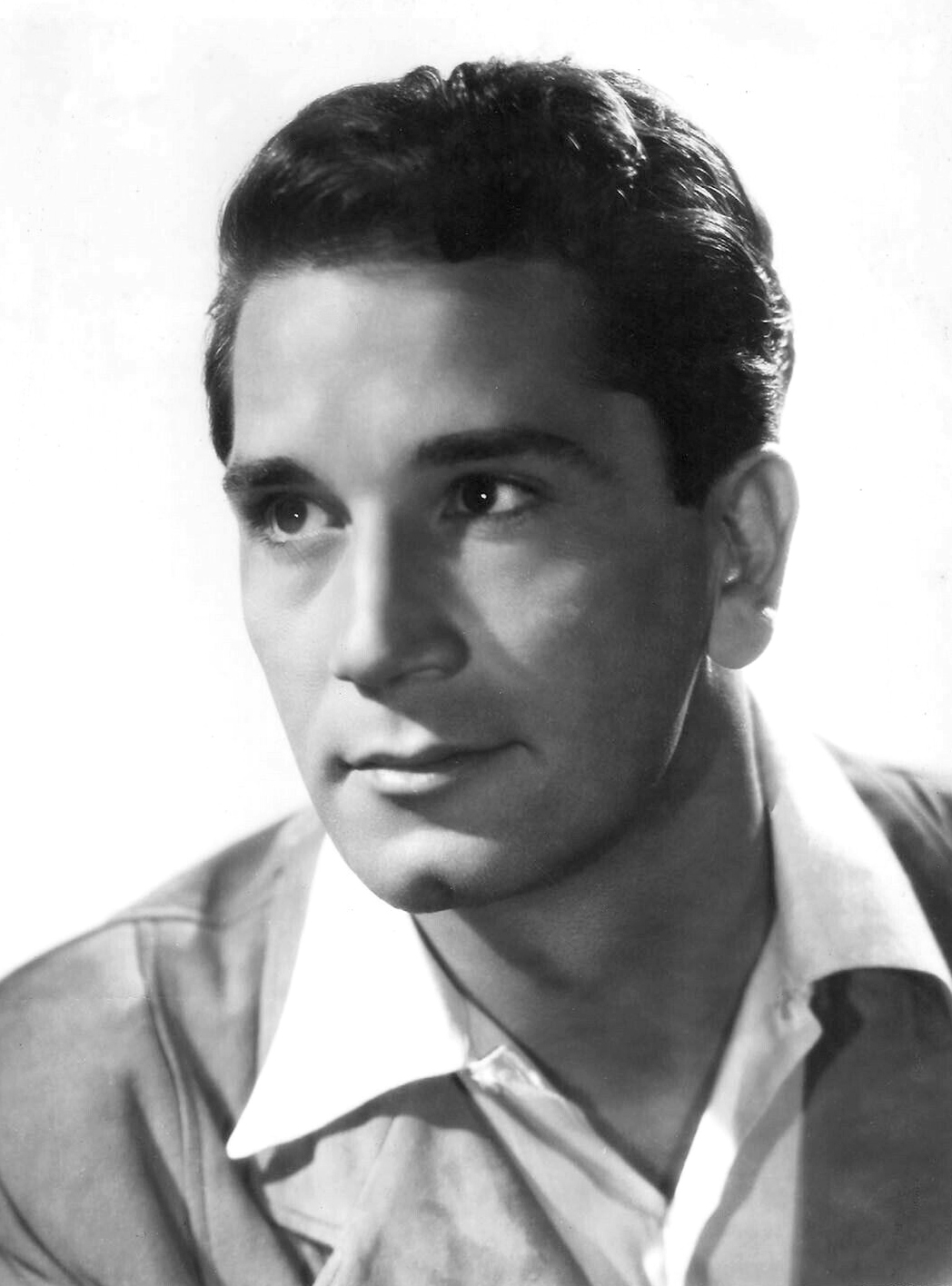
- Conte in the 1940s
- Born: Nicholas Peter Conte; March 24, 1910; Jersey City, New Jersey, U.S.
- Died: April 15, 1975 (aged 65); Los Angeles, California, U.S.
- Resting place: Westwood Village Memorial Park Cemetery
- Occupation: Actor
- Years active: 1939–1975
- Spouses: Ruth Storey (m. 1943; div. 1963) Shirlee Colleen Garner (m. 1973)
- Children: 1

Richard Conte (born Nicholas Peter Conte; March 24, 1910 – April 15, 1975) was an American actor. He was known for his starring roles in films noir and crime dramas during the 1940s and 1950s, including Call Northside 777, Cry of the City, House of Strangers, Whirlpool, The Blue Gardenia, and The Big Combo.

Conte also co-starred in three films opposite Frank Sinatra: the original Ocean's 11, Tony Rome, and Lady in Cement. Later in his career, he achieved recognition for his portrayal of Emilio Barzini, the mob boss rival to Vito Corleone and the principal antagonist of The Godfather (1972).

== Early life and education ==
Conte was born Nicholas Peter Conte on March 24, 1910 in Jersey City, New Jersey, the son of Italian-Americans Julia (nee Fina), a seamstress, and Pasquale Conte, a barber. He graduated from William L. Dickinson High School in Jersey City.

Conte worked as a truck driver, messenger, shoe salesman, and singing waiter before starting his acting career. He was discovered by film director Elia Kazan and actor John Garfield during his job at a Connecticut resort, which led to Conte finding stage work. He eventually earned a scholarship to study at the Neighborhood Playhouse in New York City, where he became a standout actor.

== Career ==
=== Stage ===
He made his film debut under the name Nicholas Conte in Heaven with a Barbed Wire Fence (1939) at 20th Century Fox. He played Tony, a hobo who meets up with Joe (Glenn Ford who was also making his film debut) and Anita (Jean Rogers). The three of them make their way west hopping trains. They are later joined by Professor B (Raymond Walburn).

He made his Broadway debut in My Heart's in the Highlands (1939) for the Group Theatre. Also for the Group, he was in Clifford Odets' Night Music (1940). He performed in the road company of Golden Boy.

On Broadway, he was in Heavenly Express (1941) and Walk Into My Parlor (1941). He was a hit in Jason (1942), followed by Family (1943).

During World War II, Conte served in the United States Army, but he was discharged because of eye trouble.

=== 20th Century Fox ===
In May 1943, Conte signed a long-term contract with 20th Century Fox, changing his name to Richard Conte. His first Fox film was Guadalcanal Diary (1943), where he was billed fourth.

He followed it with another war drama, The Purple Heart (1944), directed by Lewis Milestone; he was billed second, beneath Dana Andrews.

Conte had a smaller part in Captain Eddie (1945), a biopic about Eddie Rickenbacker, and played an Italian POW in A Bell for Adano (1945).

Conte had the star role in A Walk in the Sun (1945), another war film for Milestone, and he was teamed again with Andrews.

=== Success ===
Fox promoted Conte to top billing with the film noir The Spider (1945). Although a B film for the studio, it was successful enough to establish Conte in film noir.

He had supporting roles in Somewhere in the Night (1946), directed by Joseph Mankiewicz, and the spy film 13 Rue Madeleine (1946), directed by Henry Hathaway.

Conte was borrowed by Enterprise Productions for The Other Love (1947) with Barbara Stanwyck and David Niven. Back at Fox, he was in Hathaway's crime drama Call Northside 777 (1948) as the prisoner whose innocence is proved by James Stewart.

Conte was teamed with Victor Mature in Cry of the City (1948). MGM borrowed him for Big Jack (1949), then he did House of Strangers (1949) with Edward G. Robinson, playing Max Monetti, a lawyer who defends his father (Robinson) against government charges of banking irregularities and goes to prison for jury tampering.

Conte was top billed in Thieves' Highway (1949), directed by Jules Dassin, and co-starred with Gene Tierney in Otto Preminger's film noir Whirlpool (1950).

=== Universal ===
Conte signed a contract with Universal Pictures, and he starred in some crime films: The Sleeping City (1950); Hollywood Story (1951), directed by William Castle; and The Raging Tide (1951).

After doing The Fighter (1952) for United Artists, he returned to Universal for The Raiders (1952).

Conte went to Warner Bros to co-star with Anne Baxter and Ann Sothern in The Blue Gardenia (1953) directed by Fritz Lang. Back at Universal, Conte was in Desert Legion (1953). He made Slaves of Babylon (1953) for Sam Katzman at Columbia. Conte started guest starring on TV shows such as Medallion Theatre, Ford Television Theatre, and General Electric Theater.

=== Bill Broidy ===
In 1953, Conte signed a contract with Bill Broidy to make six films over three years, and he would be paid 25% of the profits. The first was the crime drama Highway Dragnet (1954), based on a story by Roger Corman, and he then went to England to make Mask of Dust (1954) for Hammer Films director Terence Fisher. He was going to direct The Wolf Pack for Broidy, but it was not made.

Back in the U.S., Conte did The Big Combo (1955) for Cornel Wilde's company; New York Confidential (1955) for producer Edward Small; and The Big Tip Off (1955) for Broidy.

Conte went to England for Little Red Monkey (1955), RKO for Bengazi (1955), and Warners for a Korean War movie Target Zero (1955).

Conte broke out of B movies with the second lead in I'll Cry Tomorrow (1955), an MGM biopic about Lillian Roth starring Susan Hayward. Conte and director Daniel Mann announced they would make Play by Play, but it was not made.

=== Columbia ===
Conte made a series of films for Columbia. He co-starred with Judy Holliday in Full of Life (1956), played the lead in The Brothers Rico (1957), and had supporting roles in This Angry Age (1957) and They Came to Cordura (1959).

=== Television ===
He continued to guest on TV shows like The 20th Century-Fox Hour and The Twilight Zone ("Perchance to Dream") and played the lead in a TV adaptation of The Gambler, the Nun and the Radio (1960). He had his first regular TV role in The Four Just Men (1959–1960).

Conte supported Frank Sinatra in Ocean's 11 (1960) but then focused on TV: Alfred Hitchcock Presents, Bus Stop, Naked City, Checkmate, Frontier Circus, The DuPont Show of the Week, The Untouchables, Alcoa Premiere, Going My Way, Kraft Mystery Theater, 77 Sunset Strip, The Reporter, Kraft Suspense Theatre and Arrest and Trial.

He had a supporting role in Who's Been Sleeping in My Bed? (1963), Circus World (1964) and The Greatest Story Ever Told (1965) (playing Barabbas) and the lead in The Eyes of Annie Jones (1964) for Robert L. Lippert. After Synanon (1965), he had the lead in Stay Tuned for Terror (1965), shot in Argentina.

Conte had a supporting role in Assault on a Queen (1966), and he was one of several stars in Hotel (1967). In 1966, Conte landed a supporting role in the short-lived CBS sitcom The Jean Arthur Show.

He appeared as Lieutenant Dave Santini in two crime films with Frank Sinatra: Tony Rome (1967) and Lady in Cement (1968). He also did Sentenza di morte (1968).

In 1968, he released his only film as a director, Operation Cross Eagles, in which he also starred.

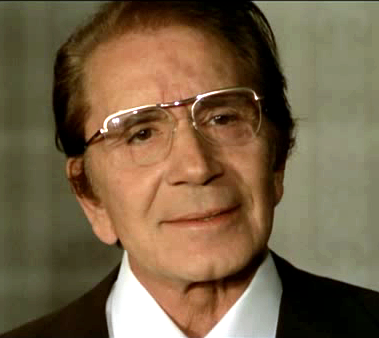
Conte in the Italian film Shoot First, Die Later (1974).

Conte's later performances include The Bold Ones: The Lawyers, The Challengers (1970), and The Name of the Game (1970).

=== The Godfather and later career ===
Conte gave one of his most memorable performances in The Godfather (1972) as Don Emilio Barzini. He was at one time also considered for the title role, Don Vito Corleone, a role performed by Marlon Brando.

The success of the film led to Conte being cast in a series of "mob" roles, mainly in Italian-produced poliziotteschi films. These included Anna, quel particolare piacere (1972), The Violent Professionals (1973), Il Boss (1973), My Brother Anastasia (1973) with Alberto Sordi, Tony Arzenta (1973) with Alain Delon, Shoot First, Die Later (1974) and Violent Rome (1975). He did the horror films Evil Eye (1975), A Diary of a Murderess (1975) and Naked Exorcism (1975).

== Personal life ==
Conte was married to actress Ruth Storey, with whom he adopted a son, film editor Mark Conte. In 1950, Conte and Storey were living at 1366 San Ysidro Drive in Beverly Hills. They divorced in 1963. He married his second wife, Shirlee Colleen Garner (1935-2014), in 1973. His grandson is National Football League free safety Chris Conte. Chris is the son of Mark Conte.

=== Death ===
On April 3, 1975, Conte suffered a massive heart attack and a stroke. He was taken to UCLA Medical Center where the staff worked for eight hours to keep him alive. He was put in intensive care and died on April 15. He is buried in Westwood Memorial Park in Los Angeles.

== Selected filmography ==
- Heaven with a Barbed Wire Fence (1939) as Tony
- Guadalcanal Diary (1943) as Captain Davis
- The Purple Heart (1944) as Lieutenant Angelo Canelli
- Captain Eddie (1945) as Private John Bartek
- A Bell for Adano (1945) as Nicolo (Italian POW)
- The Spider (1945) as Chris Conlon
- A Walk in the Sun (1945) as Private Rivera
- 13 Rue Madeleine (1946) as Bill O'Connell
- Somewhere in the Night (1946) as Mel Phillips
- The Other Love (1947) as Paul Clermont
- Call Northside 777 (1948) as Frank W. Wiecek
- Cry of the City (1948) as Martin Rome
- Big Jack (1949) as Dr. Alexander Meade
- House of Strangers (1949) as Max Monetti
- Thieves' Highway (1949) as Nick Garcos
- Whirlpool (1950) as Dr. William 'Bill' Sutton
- The Sleeping City (1950) as Fred Rowan, aka Fred Gilbert
- Hollywood Story (1951) as Larry O'Brien
- The Raging Tide (1951) as Bruno Felkin
- Under the Gun (1951) as Bert Galvin
- The Fighter (1952) as Felipe Rivera
- Riders of Vengeance (1952) as Jan Morrell
- The Blue Gardenia (1953) as Casey Mayo
- Desert Legion (1953) as Crito Damou / Omar Ben Khalif
- Slaves of Babylon (1953) as Nahum
- Highway Dragnet (1954) as Jim Henry
- Mask of Dust (1954) as Peter Wells
- The Big Combo (1955) as Mr. Brown
- New York Confidential (1955) as Nick Magellan
- The Big Tip Off (1955) as Johnny Denton
- Little Red Monkey (1955) as Bill Locklin
- Bengazi (1955) as John Gillmore
- Target Zero (1955) as Lieutenant Tom Flagler
- I'll Cry Tomorrow (1955) as Tony Bardeman
- Full of Life (1956) as Nick Rocco
- The Brothers Rico (1957) as Eddie Rico
- This Angry Age (The Sea Wall) (1957) as Michael
- They Came to Cordura (1959) as Corporal Milo Trubee
- The Twilight Zone (1959) as Edward Hall
- Ocean's 11 (1960) as Anthony Bergdorf
- Pepe (1960) as Richard Conte
- Alfred Hitchcock Presents (1961) (Season 7 Episode 8: "The Old Pro") as Frank Burns
- The Untouchables (1961) (Season 2 Episode 15: "The Organization") as Arnie Seeger
- The Untouchables (1962) (Season 4 Episode 3: "The Chess Game") as Ira Bauer
- Naked City (1962) (Season 3 Episode 17: "One of the Most Important Men in the Whole World") as Phil Clifford
- Who's Been Sleeping in My Bed? (1963) as Leonard Ashley
- The Eyes of Annie Jones (1964) as David Wheeler
- Circus World (1964) as Aldo Alfredo
- Arrest and Trial (1964) (Season 1 Episode 26: "Tigers Are for Jungles) as Paul Dunnell
- The Greatest Story Ever Told (1965) as Barabbas
- Synanon (1965) as Reid Kimble
- Strange Invasion also Extraña invasión and Stay Tuned for Terror (1965) as Steven Jameson
- Assault on a Queen (1966) as Tony Moreno
- Hotel (1967) as Detective Dupere
- Tony Rome (1967) as Lieutenant Dave Santini
- Death Sentence (1968) as Diaz
- Operation Cross Eagles (1968) as Lieutenant Bradford (also directed)
- Lady in Cement (1968) as Lieutenant Dave Santini
- Explosion (1969) as Dr. Philip Neal
- The Challengers (TV movie) (1970) as Ritchie
- The Godfather (1972) as Don Emilio Barzini
- Il Boss (Murder Inferno) (1973) as Don Corrasco
- The Big Family (1973) as Don Antonio Marchesi
- My Brother Anastasia (1973) as Alberto 'Big Al' Anastasia
- The Violent Professionals (1973) as Padulo
- Pete, Pearl & the Pole (1973) as Bruno
- Tony Arzenta (Big Guns) (1973) as Nick Gusto
- Anna, quel particolare piacere (1973) as Riccardo Sogliani
- Shoot First, Die Later (1974) as Mazzanti
- Evil Eye (1975) as Dr. Stone
- La encadenada (A Diary of a Murderess) (1975) as Alexander
- Violent Rome (1975) as Lawyer Sartori
- The Godfather Saga (1977) as Don Emilio Barzini
- Un urlo dalle tenebre (Naked Exorcism) (1975) as Exorcist

== Theatre credits ==
Year	Title	Role	Venue	Notes	Ref.
1939	My Heart's in the Highlands	Real Estate Agent	Guild Theatre	Broadway debut	
1940	Night Music	Ensemble member	Broadhurst Theatre		
1940	Heavenly Express	Julio	National Theatre		
1941	Walk Into My Parlor	Gino	Forest Theatre		
1942	Jason	Messenger	Hudson Theatre		
1943	The Family	Peter	Windsor Theatre		

== Radio performances ==
Year	Program	Episode/source
1946	Reader's Digest Radio Edition	Our Lady's Juggler
1946	Suspense	"Win, Place and Murder"
1953	Hollywood Star Playhouse	Blackout

== Awards and nominations ==
Award	Year	Category	Work	Result
Golden Laurel	1960	Top Action Performance	They Came to Cordura	Nominated
