= Love Happy =

1949 Marx Brothers film by David Miller

- Directed by: David Miller
- Screenplay by: Frank Tashlin; Mac Benoff
- Story by: Harpo Marx
- Produced by: Lester Cowan; Mary Pickford (uncredited)
- Starring: Harpo Marx; Chico Marx; Groucho Marx; Ilona Massey; Vera-Ellen; Marion Hutton; Raymond Burr; Melville Cooper; Leon Belasco; Paul Valentine; Eric Blore; Bruce Gordon
- Cinematography: William Mellor
- Edited by: Basil Wrangell; Albrecht Joseph
- Music by: Ann Ronell
- Distributed by: United Artists
- Release dates: October 12, 1949 (San Francisco); March 3, 1950
- Running time: 91 minutes
- Country: United States
- Language: English

Love Happy is a 1949 American musical comedy film released by United Artists, directed by David Miller and starring the Marx Brothers (Groucho, Harpo and Chico) in their 13th and final feature film. The screenplay was written by Frank Tashlin and Mac Benoff, based on a story by Harpo.

Produced by former silent film star Mary Pickford, Love Happy features Groucho Marx in a smaller role than usual, with a supporting cast including Ilona Massey, Vera-Ellen, Marion Hutton, Raymond Burr, Paul Valentine, Melville Cooper, Eric Blore and Bruce Gordon (in his film debut) and a brief appearance by a relatively unknown Marilyn Monroe.

== Plot ==
Private detective Sam Grunion has been searching for the extremely valuable Royal Romanoff diamonds for eleven years, and his investigation leads him to a struggling young theatrical troupe, led by Mike Johnson, who are trying to put on a musical revue called Love Happy.

Grunion notes that the impoverished young dancers would starve were it not for the sweet, silent Harpo, at Herbert & Herbert, a gourmet food shop that also traffics in stolen diamonds. Harpo kindly helps ladies with their shopping bags, all the while helping himself to their groceries and stuffing them in the pockets of his long trench coat. When the elegant Madame Egelichi arrives, store manager Lefty Throckmorton tells her that "the sardines" have arrived. Harpo sneaks into the basement and watches as Lefty unpacks a sardine can marked with a Maltese cross, and swipes the marked can from Lefty's pocket, replacing it with an unmarked one. Madame Egelichi, who has gone through eight husbands in three months in her quest for the Romanoff diamonds, is furious when Lefty produces the wrong can. When Lefty remembers seeing Harpo in the basement, she orders him to call the police and offer a $1,000 reward for his capture.

At the theater, meanwhile, unemployed entertainer Faustino the Great asks Mike for a job as a mind-reader, and when Faustino's clever improvisation prevents the show's backer, Mr. Lyons, from repossessing the scenery, Mike gratefully hires him. Harpo, who is secretly in love with Mike's girl friend, dancer Maggie Pillips, gives her the can of sardines and she tells him that she will eat them tomorrow. A policeman spots Harpo inside the theater and brings him to Madame Egelichi, who turns Harpo over to her two henchmen, Alphonse and Hannibal Zoto. While searching Harpo's trench coat for the can with the diamonds, they find, among several other objects, a mailbox, a block of ice, a sled and a live dog. After three days of interrogation by the Zoto brothers, Harpo still refuses to talk, and when he is left alone, he telephones Faustino at the theater, using the bike horn he carries in his pocket to communicate. Madame Egelichi listens on the extension as Faustino declares that there are plenty of sardines at the theater, and she goes there immediately.

Meanwhile, Mike has just finished telling the troupe that they do not have enough money to open when Madame Egelichi arrives and offers to finance the show. Mike cancels his plans to take Maggie out for her birthday so that he and his new backer can discuss the arrangements. In the alley outside the theater, Harpo, having escaped from Madame Egelichi's suite, finds the diamonds in the sardine can which had been set out for a cat, and puts them in his pocket. When he finds Maggie crying in her dressing room, Harpo takes her to Central Park, where he plays the harp for her and gives her the diamonds as a birthday gift.

On the opening night of the show, Grunion is visited by an agent of the Romanoff family, who threatens to kill him if he does not produce the diamonds in an hour. At the theater, Lefty and the Zoto brothers spy through a window as Maggie puts on the diamond necklace, but Mike asks her not to wear it, promising to buy her an engagement ring instead. As they kiss, Maggie removes the necklace and drops it on the piano strings. The curtain goes up, and when Harpo sees Lefty and the Zoto brothers menacing Maggie, he distracts them with a piece of costume jewelry and leads them up to the roof. Meanwhile, on stage, Faustino plays the piano, and when he strikes the keys forcefully, the diamond necklace flies into the air, drawing the attention of Madame Egelichi, who is in the audience. Faustino quickly pockets the diamonds, then rushes to the roof to help Harpo. Madame Egelichi shows up with a gun and demands the necklace, but Faustino gives her the fake diamonds. After tying up Lefty and the Zotos and recovering the real diamonds, Harpo encounters Grunion, who has been hiding on the roof. Harpo drops the diamonds in Grunion's pocket, but then steals them back as Madame Egelichi begins to lead the detective away.

Later, in his office, Grunion comments that Harpo disappeared with the diamonds, never realizing their true value. Grunion interrupts his story to take a phone call from his wife, who turns out to be the former Madame Egelichi.

== Cast ==
- Harpo Marx as Harpo
- Chico Marx as Faustino the Great
- Groucho Marx as Detective Sam Grunion
- Vera-Ellen as Maggie Phillips
- Ilona Massey as Madame Egelichi
- Paul Valentine as Mike Johnson
- Marion Hutton as Bunny Dolan
- Leon Belasco as Mr. Lyons
- Melville Cooper as Lefty Throckmorton
- Raymond Burr as Alphonse Zoto
- Bruce Gordon as Hannibal Zoto
- Eric Blore as Mackinaw
- Marilyn Monroe as Grunion's client
- Otto Waldis as Ivan (uncredited)

== Musical numbers ==
The film has a musical score and lyrics by Ann Ronell, with a lively dance version of a Sadie Thompson number. The piece features Vera-Ellen and former ballet dancer Paul Valentine on a South Pacific Island.

Chico plays a duet on "Gypsy Love Song" with actor-musician Leon Belasco as Mr. Lyons, the owner of the stage props and costumes. Chico played this same song in the Marx Brothers' first film, The Cocoanuts, 20 years earlier.

=== Songs ===
Title	Performer(s)	Note(s)
"Love Happy"	Sung by Marion Hutton (with chorus and danced by Vera-Ellen)	Dance reprise by Paul Valentine
"Willow Weep for Me"	Danced by Vera-Ellen (and men's chorus)	Instrumental arrangement
"Happy Birthday to You"	Harpo Marx (on a harp)	-
"Who Stole the Jam?"	Sung by Marion Hutton	-
"Gypsy Love Song"	Chico Marx (on piano); Leon Belasco (on violin)	-
"Old Folks at Home (Swanee River)"	Harpo Marx (on a harp)	-
"Polonaise in A Flat, Op. 53"	Chico Marx (on piano)	-
"Rock-a-Bye Baby"	-	In the score when Harpo swings on the pendulum

== Production ==
Love Happy was originally conceived as a solo vehicle for Harpo under the title Diamonds in the Sidewalk, Chico, who was usually in need of money due to his lifelong gambling addiction, also became involved in the project. Once Chico was in, financing for the film couldn't be obtained unless all three Marx Brothers were featured, so Groucho agreed to appear in the film. Love Happy was the final film to be produced by Mary Pickford.

Groucho appears in the film without his usual greasepaint moustache and eyebrows; by this point in his career, he had grown an actual mustache and no longer saw the greasepaint as necessary. He briefly shares the screen with Harpo (the three never appear together in the same scene) during the climax of the film and mainly provides an encompassing narration to explain things when the necessary sequences for a coherent narrative were unavailable. Groucho avoided mentioning the film at all in his autobiography, Groucho and Me published in 1959, apparently at that time considering A Night in Casablanca (1946) as their last film together. He did acknowledge the film in later interviews for The Marx Brothers Scrapbook (1974) and in his later book, The Groucho Phile: An Illustrated Life (1976). Because of the encapsulated nature of Groucho's scenes, it had long been assumed that his presence in the film was an afterthought. However, recently discovered letters from Groucho show that he was asked to be part of the project from its earliest stages in 1946–47.

The production ran out of money near the end of shooting, so the producers solicited paid advertising from several companies in order to complete the film. This unique form of product placement, featured in the rooftop chase around advertising signs and billboards is common today but was quite rare at the time the film was made.

== Release ==
The film's stated copyright date is 1949, which is when it was shown in San Francisco on October 12. It was not afforded a general release until March 3, 1950. Originally released at 91 minutes, available prints of the film typically run 85 minutes and contain some brief snippets and gags that were removed from the theatrical release. In 2015, Olive Films made the original, unedited 91-minute theatrical print available on DVD.

== Reception ==
Love Happy is generally regarded by Marx fans and critics as the weakest of all the Marx Brothers films in which they were the leads. (The 1957 film The Story of Mankind is also generally rated very low, but the brothers only make short individual cameos in that film.)

Critic Philip K. Scheuer of the Los Angeles Times wrote: "[T]he film seems merely to be coasting along on a past formula. And between coasting and hitting the skids, the margin is dangerously close."

In its October 8, 1949 front-page editorial, as well as its review of the film the same issue, Harrison's Reports criticized the film for its blatant brand placement during the rooftop chase among the billboards.

At the end of his March 8, 1950, episode of his You Bet Your Life radio show, Groucho Marx half-heartedly promoted the film as "Harpo, Chico, and I tell a few jokes and do some acting. It's very educational." In later years, on Today, he dismissed it as a "terrible picture" while speaking of the lasting impression that Marilyn Monroe made during her screen test.
