= The Other Love =

1947 film by André de Toth

- Theatrical release poster
- Directed by: Andre DeToth
- Screenplay by: Ladislas Fodor; Harry Brown
- Based on: "Beyond" by Erich Maria Remarque
- Produced by: David Lewis
- Starring: Barbara Stanwyck; David Niven; Richard Conte
- Cinematography: Victor Milner
- Edited by: Walter A. Thompson
- Music by: Miklós Rózsa
- Production company: Enterprise
- Distributed by: United Artists (United States and Canada); Metro-Goldwyn-Mayer (International)
- Release date: May 14, 1947
- Running time: 95–97 minutes
- Country: United States
- Language: English
- Budget: $2.2 million
- Box office: $1,850,000 (US rentals) $1 million (UK)

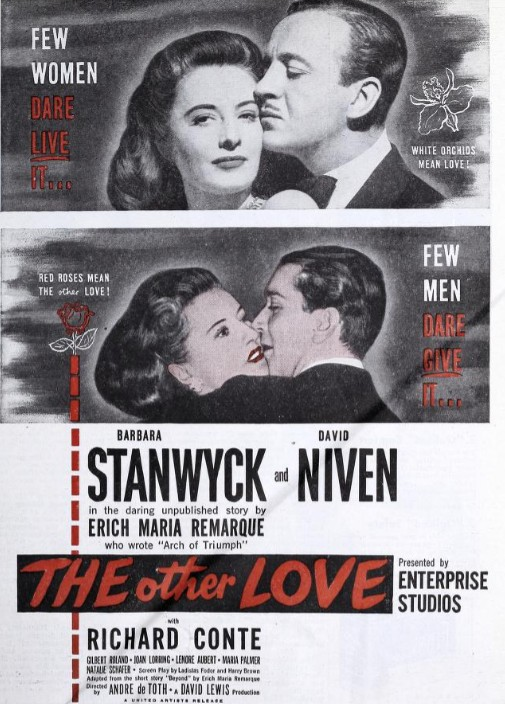
Promotional advertisement for "The Other Love" (Photoplay magazine, 1947).

The Other Love is a 1947 American film noir drama romance film directed by Andre DeToth and starring Barbara Stanwyck, David Niven, and Richard Conte. Written by Ladislas Fodor and Harry Brown based on the story "Beyond" by Erich Maria Remarque, the film is about a concert pianist who is sent to a sanatorium in Switzerland to treat a serious lung illness.

== Plot ==
Not knowing her illness is terminal, concert pianist Karen Duncan checks into a Switzerland sanatorium under the care of Dr. Tony Stanton, whose stern manner Karen does not like. One day she and another patient, Celestine Miller, enjoy a day away from the clinic and a night on the town, despite their doctor's advice.

Auto racer Paul Clermont is introduced to Karen and invites her to Monte Carlo. Although she is attracted to her doctor, Tony's seeming lack of interest in anything but her health causes Karen to accept Paul's invitation. She gambles, smokes and drinks, then returns to the sanatorium to discover that Celestine has died.

Panic-stricken, Karen's first impulse is to follow her doctor's orders to refrain from exerting herself. She disobeys, going away with Paul again and endangering her well-being. Only at the last possible minute does she return to Tony's side, where he proposes marriage to her and watches carefully as their future together hangs by a thread.

== Cast ==
- Barbara Stanwyck as Karen Duncan
- David Niven as Dr. Anthony Stanton
- Richard Conte as Paul Clermont
- Gilbert Roland as Croupier
- Joan Lorring as Celestine Miller
- Lenore Aubert as Yvonne Dupré
- Maria Palmer as Huberta
- Natalie Schafer as Dora Shelton

== Production ==
Producer David Lewis bought the rights to Erich Maria Remarque's Arch of Triumph and sold it to Enterprise Studios. As part of this deal Enterprise bought the fights to another story of Remarque, an outline, which became The Other Love.

Lewis said Stanwyck "was letter perfect at all times, and knew exactly what she was doing, but others were not. This caused us to replace Robert Stack with Richard Conte in the third lead. Stanwyck also had a habit of reducing dialogue to its essential elements, and since Harry Brown, who had done dialogue work on the script, needed a kind of rhythm for best effect, it hurt his work badly."

== Reception ==
In his review for The New York Times, Bosley Crowther called the film "a typical artificial romance on the heart-rending theme of Camille".

Lewis said the film made a profit.

== See also ==
- Bobby Deerfield (1977)

== Notes ==
- Lewis, David (1993). Curtis, James (ed.). The Creative Producer. Metuchen: Scarecrow Press. ISBN 0-8108-2720-4.
