= Marion Hutton =

American singer and actress (1919–1987)

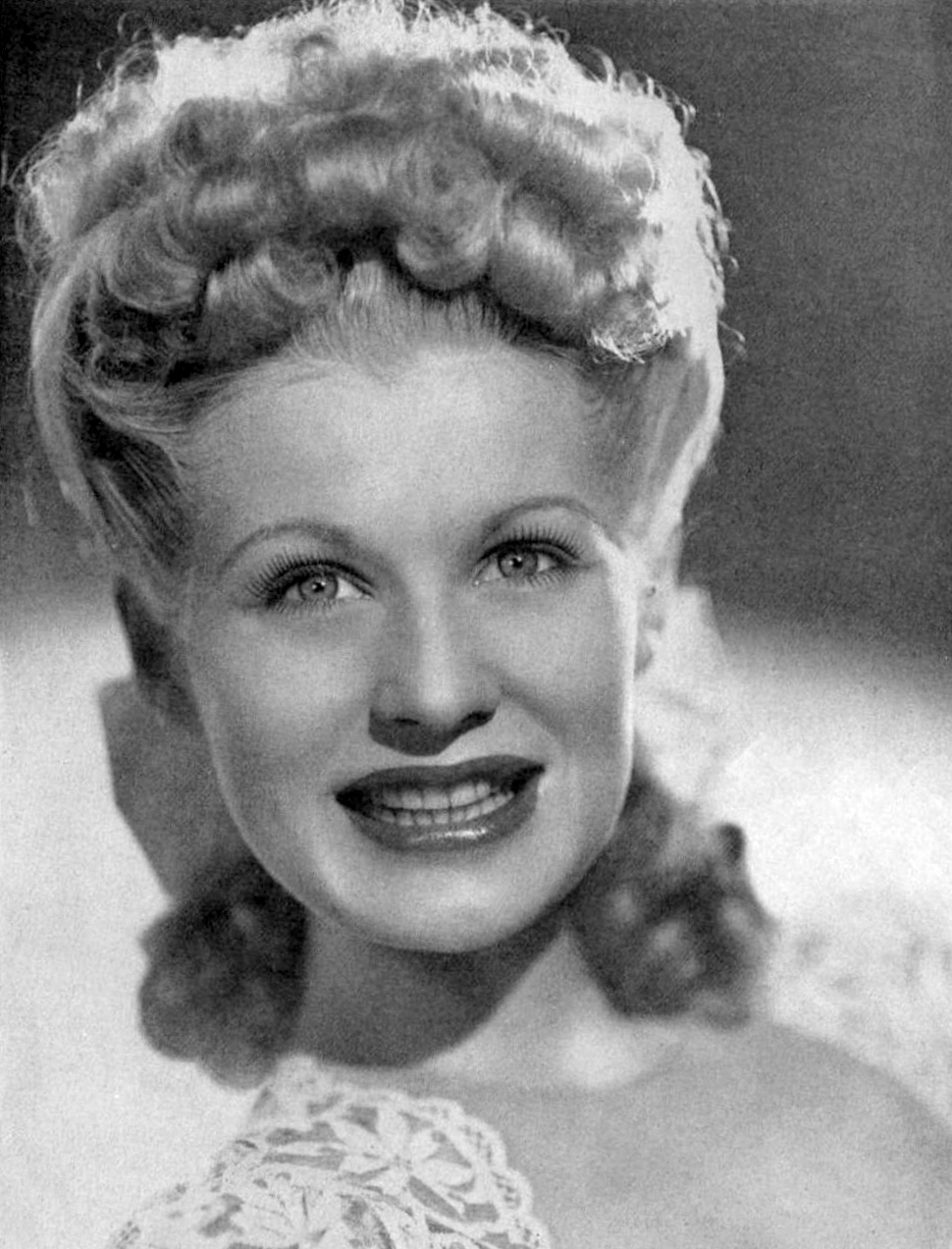
- Hutton in 1944
- Born: Marion Thornburg; March 10, 1919; Fort Smith, Arkansas, U.S.
- Died: January 10, 1987 (aged 67); Kirkland, Washington, U.S.
- Occupations: Singer, actress
- Spouses: Jack Philbin (m. 1940; div. 1949) Jack Douglas (m. 1949; div. 1954) Vic Schoen (m. 1954)
- Children: 3
- Relatives: Betty Hutton (sister)

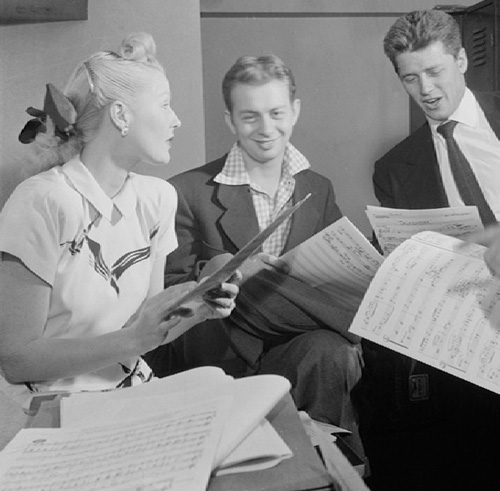
Hutton with Mel Tormé and Gordon MacRae in 1947

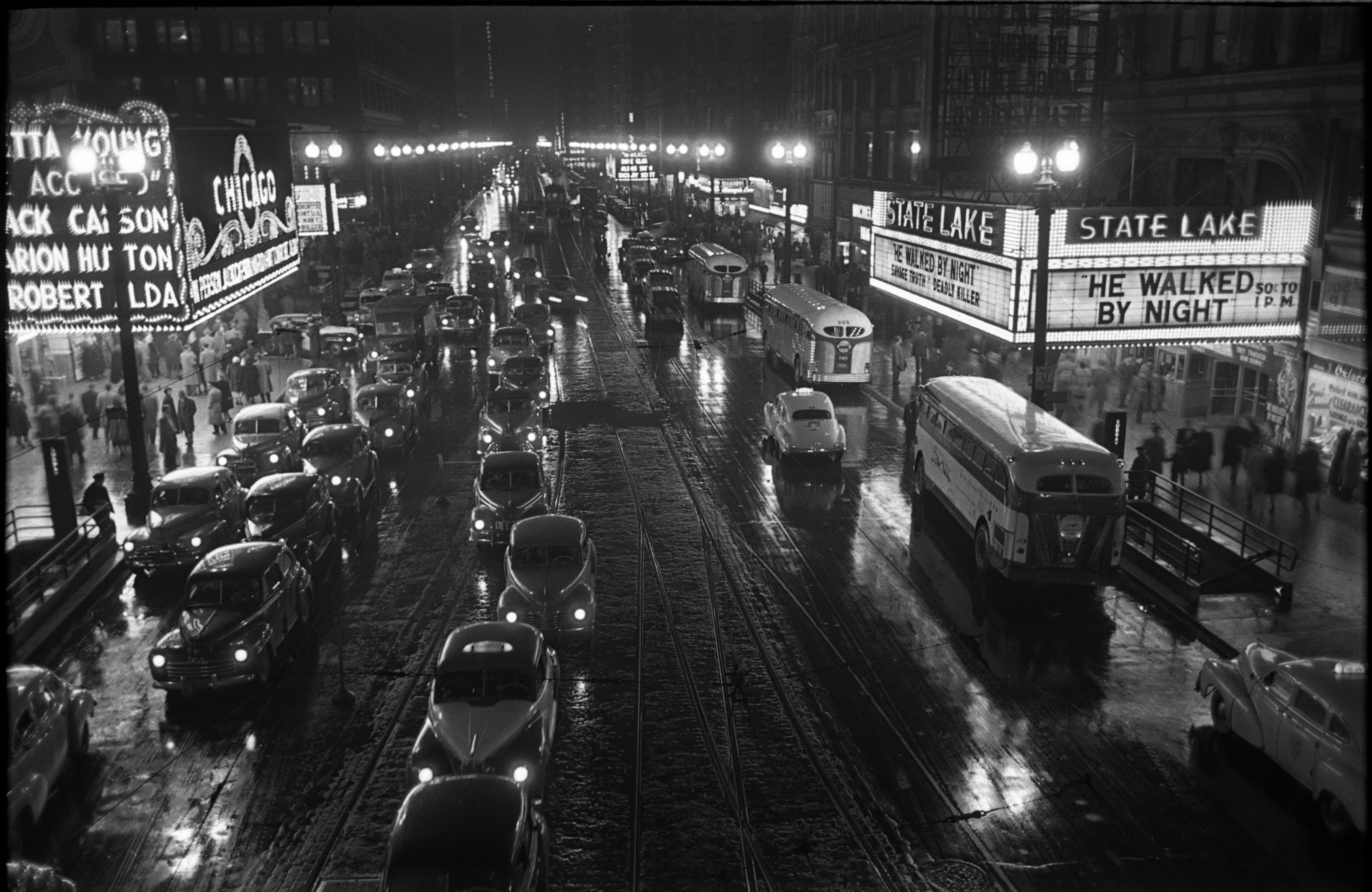
Photo of a Chicago streetscape taken by Stanley Kubrick for Look magazine, 1949, from State/Lake station

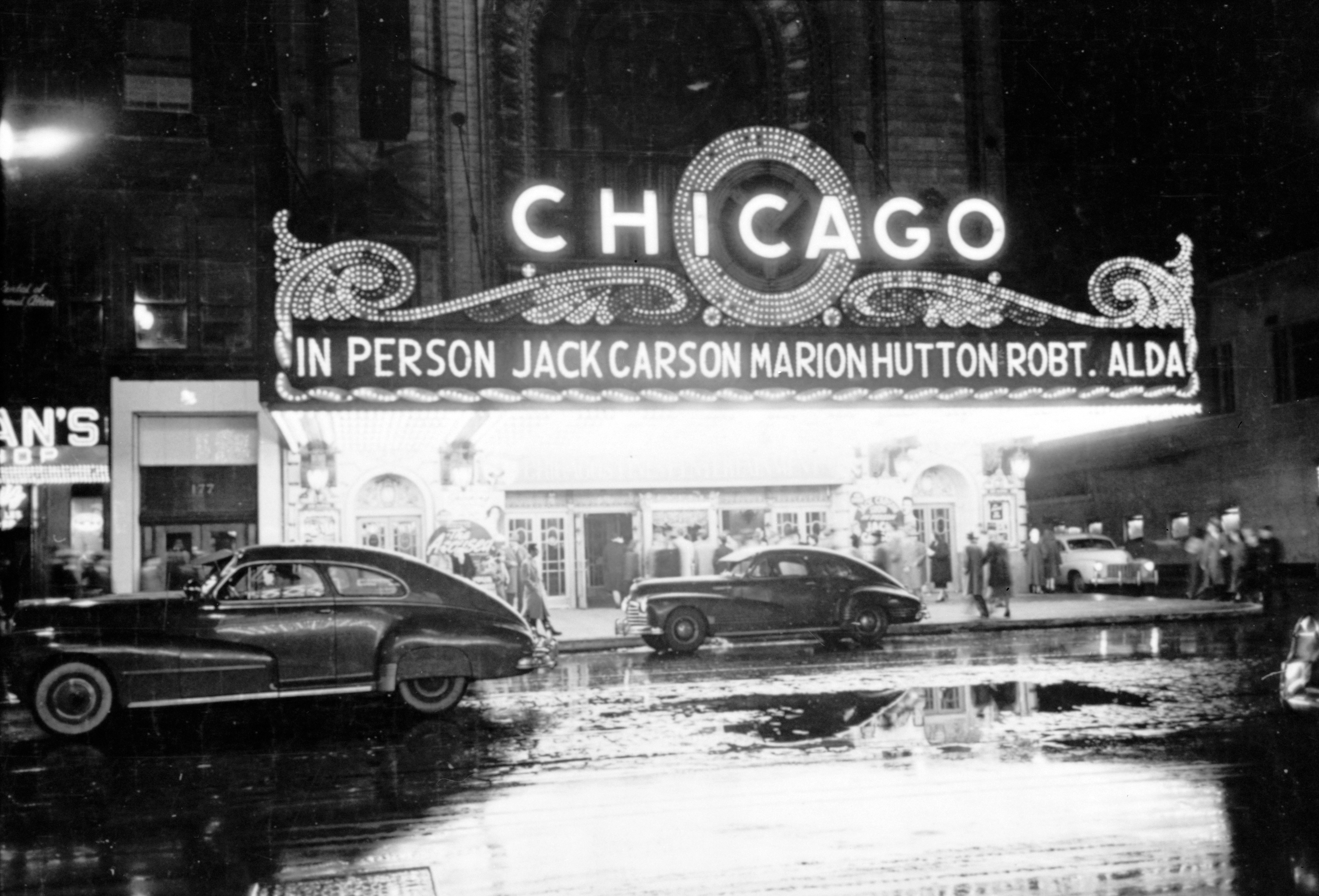
People arriving at the Chicago Theatre for a show starring, in person, Jack Carson, Marion Hutton, and Robert Alda, taken by Stanley Kubrick for Look magazine, 1949

Marion Hutton (born Marion Thornburg; March 10, 1919 – January 10, 1987) was an American singer and actress. She is best remembered for her singing with the Glenn Miller Orchestra from 1938 to 1942. She was the sister of actress and singer Betty Hutton.

== Early life ==
Hutton was born as Marion Thornburg in Fort Smith, Arkansas, the elder sister of actress Betty Hutton. They were raised in Battle Creek, Michigan. The sisters' father abandoned the family when they were both young; he later died of suicide. Their mother worked a variety of jobs to support the family until she became a successful bootlegger. Both sisters sang with the Vincent Lopez Orchestra.

== Discovery by Glenn Miller ==
Hutton was discovered by Glenn Miller and was invited to join the Glenn Miller Orchestra in 1938. "I was only seventeen then [...] and so Glenn and Helen [Miller] became my legal guardians. He was like a father because I never had a father I remembered." Miller wanted Hutton to appear as an all-American girl, so on her first few performances, he introduced her as "Sissy Jones." The pseudonym was not used beyond those first performances.

Hutton considered herself more an entertainer than a singer, and became an important part of the Miller band.

== Film career ==
Marion had a small role in the film Orchestra Wives (1942; Twentieth Century Fox), in which the Glenn Miller Orchestra starred. After Miller joined the Army in 1942, she went with fellow Miller performers Tex Beneke and the Modernaires on a theater tour.

The next important event in her entertainment career was a role in In Society with Abbott and Costello in 1944. Marion appeared with the Desi Arnaz orchestra in October 1947 at the Radio City Theatre in Minneapolis. As the 1940s wound down, so did Marion's career. Hutton's last film role was in the Marx Brothers' final film, Love Happy (1949).

== Radio and television career ==
In 1949, Hutton became a regular on The Jack Carson Show. As part of the show, Marion toured with Jack Carson and Robert Alda. Hutton appeared on Carson's television program in 1950 and 1951.

== Personal life ==
Hutton was married three times. She married publicist and television producer Jack Philbin in 1940. They had two sons. Her next marriage, to writer Jack Douglas, produced a third son. Her last and longest marriage was in 1954 to Vic Schoen, an arranger for the Andrews Sisters and Bing Crosby, among other artists in the 1940s. The couple remained married until her death in 1987. Looking back on her first marriage, in 1974 she told George T. Simon, "[W]hat I wanted most of all was to be a wife and mother. I had no drive for a career."

In 1965 Hutton sought treatment for various addictions. Hutton went back to school in her late fifties. Starting in 1972, she went on to receive a Bachelor's in psychology and a Master's in family counseling, then found work at a local hospital. During the 1960s and 1970s, Hutton and Schoen lived in Laguna Beach but later moved due to increasing financial problems. In 1981, Hutton and Schoen moved from Irvine, California, to Kirkland, Washington, and founded Residence XII, a drug addiction center to help alcoholics and addicts.

Schoen arranged music for the PBS production "Glenn Miller - A Moonlight Serenade" commemorating the Miller band's breakthrough performance at the Glen Island Casino. Produced to recognize the 40th anniversary of Miller's death, it starred Beneke, Johnny Desmond, and Hutton.

=== Death ===
Marion Hutton died of cancer on January 10, 1987, at age 67, in Kirkland, Washington.

== Filmography ==
- Orchestra Wives (1942) – Band Singer (uncredited)
- Crazy House (1943) – Herself
- In Society (1944) – Elsie Hemmerdingle
- Babes On Swing Street (1944) – Herself
- Love Happy (1949) – Bunny Dolan

== Selected discography ==
- 1939 "Ding-Dong! The Witch Is Dead", vocal with Glenn Miller and his Orchestra, Bluebird (recorded July 12, 1939)
- 1939 "The Man with the Mandolin", vocal with Glenn Miller and his Orchestra, Bluebird (recorded July 12, 1939)
- 1939 "Bluebirds in the Moonlight", vocal with Glenn Miller and his Orchestra, Bluebird (recorded October 9, 1939)
- 1940 "Ooh! What You Said", vocal with Glenn Miller and his Orchestra, Bluebird (recorded December 6, 1939)
- 1940 "The Rhumba Jumps" vocal with Tex Beneke, with Glenn Miller and his Orchestra, Bluebird (recorded January 26, 1940)
- 1940 "Say "Si Si"" vocal with Glenn Miller and his Orchestra, Bluebird 10622 (recorded January 26, 1940)
- 1940 "The Woodpecker Song", vocal with Glenn Miller and his Orchestra, Bluebird (recorded January 29, 1940)
- 1940 "Boog It", vocal with Glenn Miller and his Orchestra, Bluebird (recorded March 30, 1940)
- 1940 "Five O'clock Whistle", vocal with Glenn Miller and his Orchestra, Bluebird (recorded June 10, 1940)
- 1940 "You've Got Me This Way", vocal with Glenn Miller and his Orchestra, Bluebird (recorded October 11, 1940)
- 1941 "Yes, My Darling Daughter", vocal with Glenn Miller and his Orchestra, Bluebird (recorded November 15, 1940)
- 1942 "Don't Sit Under the Apple Tree (with Anyone Else but Me)", vocal with Tex Beneke and The Modernaires, with Glenn Miller and his Orchestra, Bluebird (recorded February 18, 1942)
- 1942 "Knit One, Purl Two", vocal with The Modernaires, with Glenn Miller and his Orchestra, Victor (recorded May 20, 1942)
- 1942 "(I've Got a Gal in) Kalamazoo" vocal with The Modernaires, with Glenn Miller and his Orchestra, Victor 27934-A (recorded May 20, 1942)
- 1942 "That's Sabotage" vocal with Glenn Miller and his Orchestra, Victor (recorded June 17, 1942)
- 1942 "Jukebox Saturday Night" vocal with Tex Beneke and The Modernaires, with Glenn Miller and his Orchestra, Victor (recorded July 15, 1942)
