= Phil Brown (actor) =

American actor (1916–2006)

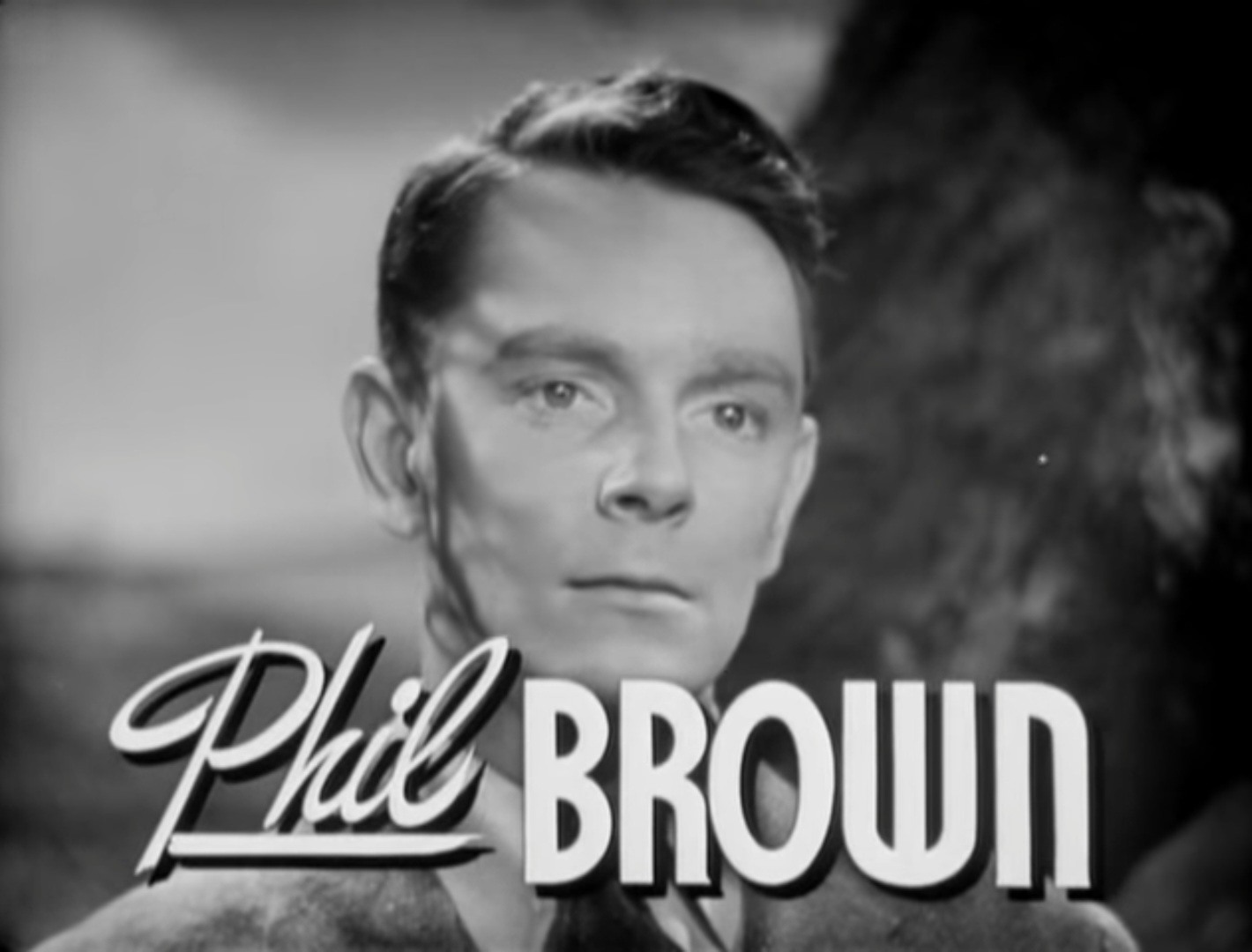
- Trailer for Calling Dr. Gillespie (1942)
- Born: Philip Mortimer Brown; April 30, 1916; Cambridge, Massachusetts, U.S.
- Died: February 9, 2006 (aged 89); Woodland Hills, California, U.S.
- Years active: 1941–1999
- Spouse: Virginia May Sharpe (m. 1940)
- Children: 1
- Website: www.philbrown.com

Philip Mortimer Brown (April 30, 1916 – February 9, 2006) was an American actor.

== Early life ==
Brown was born in Cambridge, Massachusetts, in 1916. He majored in dramatics at Stanford University, where he was a member of the Beta Theta Pi fraternity.

== Career ==
Brown played some of his first roles on stage when he joined the Group Theatre in New York City. The Group Theatre eventually closed, and many of its members relocated to Hollywood, where Brown helped found the Actors' Laboratory Theatre. He found his first cinema roles here, making his motion picture debut in Mitchell Leisen's 1941 war movie, I Wanted Wings.

In 1946, he played Ernest Hemingway's protagonist Nick Adams in Robert Siodmak's version of The Killers, alongside William Conrad and Charles McGraw as the titular "killers".

In 1948, he played Tom in Tennessee Williams's The Glass Menagerie, at the Haymarket Theatre London, in a production directed by John Gielgud.

His association with the Lab came back to haunt him later in the decade, when its members fell under the scrutiny of the House Un-American Activities Committee. Although he was not a Communist, Brown was blacklisted in 1952, and was eventually compelled to relocate with his family to the United Kingdom between 1953 and 1993.

Overseas he was able to resume acting on stage, TV and films; he also directed for the stage and TV. In 1953, Brown appeared in the play The River Line in the West End. He was best known for his role as Luke Skywalker's uncle, Owen Lars, in Star Wars (1977).

He returned to the United States in the 1990s and in later years made the rounds of autograph shows.

== Death ==
Phil Brown died in his sleep of pneumonia on February 9, 2006, at the age of 89.

== Legacy ==
His wife Ginny survives him with their son; two grandchildren and a great-grandchild.

== Filmography ==
=== Film ===
| Year | Title | Role | Notes |
|---|---|---|---|
| 1941 | I Wanted Wings | Jimmy Masters | |
| 1941 | H. M. Pulham, Esq. | Joe Bingham | |
| 1942 | Hello, Annapolis | Kansas City | |
| 1942 | Calling Dr. Gillespie | Roy Todwell | |
| 1942 | Pierre of the Plains | Val Denton | |
| 1944 | Weird Woman | David Jennings | |
| 1944 | The Impatient Years | Henry Fairchild | |
| 1945 | The Jungle Captive | Don Young | |
| 1945 | Over 21 | Frank MacDougal | |
| 1945 | State Fair | Harry Ware | |
| 1946 | Without Reservations | Soldier | |
| 1946 | The Killers | Nick Adams | Uncredited |
| 1947 | Johnny O'Clock | Phil, Hotel Clerk | |
| 1948 | If You Knew Susie | Joe Collins | |
| 1948 | The Luck of the Irish | Tom Higginbotham | |
| 1948 | Moonrise | Elmer - Soda Jerk | |
| 1949 | Obsession | Bill Kronin | |
| 1949 | Give Us This Day | Bit part | Uncredited |
| 1954 | The Green Scarf | John Bell | |
| 1957 | A King in New York | Headmaster | |
| 1958 | The Camp on Blood Island | Lt. Peter Bellamy | |
| 1959 | John Paul Jones | Sentry | |
| 1962 | The Counterfeit Traitor | Harold Murray | Uncredited |
| 1965 | The Bedford Incident | Chief Hospitalman Mckinley - Sick Bay | |
| 1966 | The Boy Cried Murder | Tom Durrant | |
| 1967 | Bomb at 10:10 | Professor Pilic | |
| 1968 | Operation Cross Eagles | Sgt. Turley | |
| 1969 | The Adding Machine | Don | |
| 1970 | Land Raiders | Sheriff John Mayfield | |
| 1970 | Tropic of Cancer | Van Norden | |
| 1970 | Togetherness | Everett | |
| 1971 | Valdez Is Coming | Malson | |
| 1972 | Ooh... You Are Awful | American Man | |
| 1973 | Scalawag | Sandy | |
| 1975 | The Romantic Englishwoman | Mr. Wilson | |
| 1976 | The Pink Panther Strikes Again | Virginia Senator | |
| 1977 | Twilight's Last Gleaming | Rev. Cartwright | |
| 1977 | Star Wars | Owen Lars | |
| 1978 | Silver Bears | American Banker | |
| 1978 | Superman | State senator (Missile Control) | |
| 1992 | Chaplin | Projectionist | |
| 1999 | Battlestar Galactica: The Second Coming | Council Elder | Short, (final film role) |

=== Television ===
| Year | Title | Role | Notes |
|---|---|---|---|
| 1980 | Oppenheimer | Lewis Strauss | 2 episodes |
| 1981 | Winston Churchill: The Wilderness Years | Lord Beaverbrook | 2 episodes |
| 1988 | The Fortunate Pilgrim | Supervisor F/O | |
| 1989 | The Martian Chronicles (miniseries) | Narrator | |
