= House of Strangers =

1949 film by Joseph L. Mankiewicz

- Theatrical release poster
- Directed by: Joseph L. Mankiewicz
- Screenplay by: Philip Yordan (Note: Uncredited contributions by Joseph L. Mankiewicz)
- Based on: I'll Never Go There Any More (1941 novel) by Jerome Weidman
- Produced by: Sol C. Siegel
- Starring: Edward G. Robinson; Susan Hayward; Richard Conte
- Cinematography: Milton R. Krasner
- Edited by: Harmon Jones
- Music by: Daniele Amfitheatrof
- Production company: 20th Century-Fox
- Distributed by: 20th Century-Fox
- Release date: July 1, 1949
- Running time: 101 minutes
- Country: United States
- Language: English
- Budget: $1.6 million
- Box office: $2 million (US/Canadian rentals)

House of Strangers is a 1949 American drama film noir directed by Joseph L. Mankiewicz from a screenplay by Philip Yordan, starring Edward G. Robinson, Susan Hayward, Richard Conte, Luther Adler, Paul Valentine and Efrem Zimbalist Jr. in his film debut. It is based on Jerome Weidman's 1941 novel I'll Never Go There Any More, which in turn is inspired by William Shakespeare's play King Lear.

The film was released by 20th Century Fox on July 1, 1949. It received positive reviews and was a commercial success. The film was nominated for the Palme d'Or at the 1949 Cannes Film Festival, and Edward G. Robinson won the Best Actor Award.

== Plot ==
Gino Monetti is a rags-to-riches Italian-American banker in New York City whose questionable business practices result in a number of criminal charges. Three of his four grown sons, the ambitious Joe, playboy Tony, and physically imposing Pietro (a budding prizefighter), unhappy at their domineering father's dismissive treatment of them, refuse to help Gino when he is put on trial. Joe is especially angry—he has to support a wife with expensive tastes. Max, a lawyer, is the only son who stays loyal to his father. He believes Gino has done nothing that warrants punishment by jail time, and serves as Gino's attorney during the trial.

After Gino signs ownership of his bank over to his wife Theresa as a temporary protective measure, Joe persuades his mother to sign it over to him and seizes control. Gino is relegated to an early retirement with a meager monthly allowance. The three brothers conspire to send Max to jail as well. When Max tells Joe of his plan to bribe a sympathetic juror to ensure a mistrial for Gino, Joe arranges for the police to catch him in the act. Max is disbarred and sentenced to seven years in prison; Max's fiancé Maria Domenico breaks off their engagement to marry Tony, but Irene Bennett, a former client of Max's whom he fell in love with, waits for him.

Meanwhile, Gino's trial ends in an acquittal, but he remains humiliated by Joe, Tony, and Pietro's betrayal and is directionless without his bank to run. He drinks and smokes heavily, and writes countless letters to Max decrying his other sons' mistreatment of them both. Irene urges Gino to stop sending the letters, knowing that Gino is trying to divide the brothers and provoke Max to take revenge, but Gino refuses. Eventually, Gino dies, and Max is let out of prison for a half-day to attend the funeral. There, Max vows revenge on his brothers and ignores his mother's pleas to let go of the hate that Gino had cultivated between them.

Max returns to the family home after completing his sentence, intent on destroying his brothers and their bank, but has a sudden change of heart when he realizes that his father was the source of the family conflict. Max is then confronted by his brothers, who still believe Max will follow through on his vow. After a fight in which Max is incapacitated, Joe orders Pietro to throw Max off their house's balcony to his death. Pietro hesitates, and Joe begins insulting Pietro in the same way their father always had, prompting Pietro to turn on Joe instead. Max saves Joe from Pietro's wrath by convincing Pietro that if he kills Joe, he would be doing exactly as their father would have wanted. Max then leaves his brothers to re-join Irene and travel to San Francisco, where they plan to start a new life together.

== Cast ==
- Edward G. Robinson as Gino Monetti
- Susan Hayward as Irene Bennett
- Richard Conte as Max Monetti
- Luther Adler as Joseph "Joe" Monetti
- Paul Valentine as Pietro Monetti
- Efrem Zimbalist Jr. as Antonio "Tony" Monetti
- Debra Paget as Maria Domenico
- Hope Emerson as Helena Domenico
- Esther Minciotti as Teresa Monetti, Gino's wife
- Diana Douglas as Elaine Monetti
- Tito Vuolo as Luca

Uncredited

- Thomas Browne Henry as Judge
- David Bauer as Prosecutor
- Mushy Callahan as Boxing Referee
- Lelia Goldoni as Emilia

== Production ==
=== Development ===
Twentieth Century-Fox purchased the rights to Jerome Weidman's novel I'll Never Go There Any More. In October 1947, producer Sol C. Siegel hired Jerome Cady to write a story outline. He next hired Philip Yordan to adapt it into a screenplay. Yordan felt the novel "didn't make any sense at all" so he asked Siegel if he could write an original story. He further claimed he wrote a series of scenes, and used that to construct a screenplay.

According to Siegel, Yordan wrote approximately 75 pages of the script but felt "it was not coming off" and therefore fired Yordan. Joseph L. Mankiewicz was hired and finished the script based on Yordan's treatment, and rewrote all the dialogue. The Screen Writers Guild arbitrated that the screenplay would be credited to both Mankiewicz and Yordan, while Yordan would also be given a story credit. Mankiewicz refused to share credit, thus Yordan was granted the sole screenplay credit.

=== Casting ===
Siegel's first choice for Max Monetti was John Garfield, but he left the role. In October 1948, Edward G. Robinson was cast as the patriarch Gino Monetti. Victor Mature was originally cast as one of the Monetti brothers, but was replaced before filming began. Due to financial disarray, producer Walter Wanger sold the last two years of his seven-year contract with Susan Hayward to Twentieth Century-Fox.

=== Filming ===
Filmed under the working title East Side Story, principal photography was shot on the Twentieth Century-Fox studio backlot, with location shooting done in Little Italy, Manhattan. The boxing sequences were filmed at Ocean Park Arena in Santa Monica, California.

The character "Gino Monetti" was loosely based on Bank of America founder Amadeo Giannini, a comparison that drew the ire of the actual Giannini family due to the fictional Monetti's corruption. During production, Spyros Skouras, president of Twentieth Century-Fox, became upset, believing that the character in fact paralleled his own family.

Yordan told biographer Patrick McGilligan: "I didn't like what Mankiewicz did [with the script]. He decided to shoot it like a play. Everything was done in full figure. If you look at the picture, you'll see the floor, the heads, and the feet. He should have done a lot of close-ups."

== Reception ==
=== Critical response ===
Bosley Crowther of The New York Times wrote the film was "a sizzling and picturesque exposure of a segment of nouveau-niche life within the Italian-American population". He also noted Edward G. Robinson "does a brisk and colorful job of making 'Papa' Monetti a brassy despot with a Sicilian dialect, and Paul Valentine, Luther Adler and Efrem Zimbalist Jr. are good as his weak sons. Likewise Richard Conte plays Max with a fine, superior air."

Variety called House of Strangers "a strong picture" and noted "Joseph L. Mankiewicz has directed with a feeling for balancing the more humorous moments with the dramatic ones. Sol C. Seigel has given the film good production values. Philip Yordan's screenplay is a faithful, workmanlike adaptation of the Jerome Weidman novel."

Harrison's Reports called House of Strangers "[a] gripping drama, excellently produced, directed and acted [...] Edward G. Robinson gives an exceedingly fine performance, probably, the best in his career; he arouses considerable sympathy, despite his faults and shortcomings."

Time magazine noted: "Except for a wobbly beam or two—notably some unlikely melodramatics at the end—House is a well-constructed movie. Into its making went an intelligent screen play by Playwright Philip Yordan; some distinguished lighting effects and camera work by Milton Krasner; and Director Joseph Mankiewicz's talent for handling atmosphere and sets as effective projections of character."

Among retrospective reviews, Dennis Schwartz liked the film, writing, "Joseph L. Mankiewicz stylishly helms the dark screenplay by Philip Yordan of Jerome Weidman's novel I'll Never Go There Any More ... It's a bitter psychological family drama that focuses on hatred as the family's driving force instead of love. Max is the ambivalent hero, the only one in the film who is a true film noir character, who is punished for being loyal to his father yet is someone who has rejected the ways of the old-country and its traditionalism for the ethics of the New World. Superb performances by Conte, Robinson, and Adler lift the ordinary dramatics into loftier territory."

On review aggregator Rotten Tomatoes, 71% of 7 critics gave the film a positive review.

=== Box office ===
The film was a box office disappointment. Siegel claimed Skouras gave the film limited distribution because of the film's parallels with his family history.

=== Awards and nominations ===
The film was entered into competition at the 1949 Cannes Film Festival. While it lost the Palme d'Or to Carol Reed's The Third Man, Edward G. Robinson won the prize for Best Actor.

== Influence ==
Turner Classic Movies writer Rob Nixon notes the film's apparent influence on Francis Ford Coppola's The Godfather (1972),

"The parallels are obvious... the powerful Italian patriarch who rules his family-run business empire with an iron fist; the four sons and their varied roles and reputations within that realm; the favored son who has his own life and work outside the family business but is drawn into it when his father is in serious trouble; that son's "exile" after an illegal act on behalf of his father; the same son's relationship with both a girl of his ethnicity and a non-Italian who has no connection and stands in opposition to the world of his family."

Nixon also notes the presence of Richard Conte, who would go on to play Don Emilio Barzini in The Godfather and was briefly considered to play Vito Corleone.

== Adaptations ==
Twentieth Century-Fox released a loose Western remake titled Broken Lance (1954), which was also produced by Siegel. The film won the Academy Award for Best Story for Yordan. Mankiewicz derided years later, "Phil Yordan made a career out of that screenplay."

The story was adapted for television with the episode "The Last Patriarch" for Kraft Television Theatre, with Walter Slezak and John Cassavetes in the lead roles. The Rock Island Argus said Cassavetes and Slezack were both "excellent". The Atlanta Journal called it "a shabby drama".

== Bibliography ==
- Geist, Kenneth L. (1978). Pictures Will Talk: The Life and Films of Joseph L. Mankiewicz. New York: Scribners. ISBN 0-684-15500-1.
- Stern, Sydney Ladensohn (2019). The Brothers Mankiewicz: Hope, Heartbreak, and Hollywood Classics. University Press of Mississippi. ISBN 978-1-617-03267-7.
- McGilligan, Patrick (1991). Backstory 2: Interviews with Screenwriters of the 1940s and 1950s. Berkeley: University of California Press.
