= Cry of the City =

1948 film by Robert Siodmak

- Theatrical release poster
- Directed by: Robert Siodmak
- Screenplay by: Richard Murphy; Ben Hecht (uncredited)
- Based on: The Chair for Martin Rome; 1947 novel by Henry Edward Helseth
- Produced by: Sol C. Siegel
- Starring: Victor Mature; Richard Conte; Fred Clark; Shelley Winters
- Cinematography: Lloyd Ahern
- Edited by: Harmon Jones
- Music by: Alfred Newman
- Color process: Black and white
- Production company: 20th Century Fox
- Distributed by: 20th Century Fox
- Release date: September 29, 1948 (United States)
- Running time: 95 minutes
- Country: United States
- Language: English

Cry of the City is a 1948 American film noir starring Victor Mature, Richard Conte, and Shelley Winters. Directed by Robert Siodmak, it is based on the novel by Henry Edward Helseth, The Chair for Martin Rome. The screenwriter Ben Hecht worked on the film's script, but is not credited. The film was partly shot on location in New York City.

Siodmak later said of Cry of the City: "I thought it was good but it's not really my kind of film: I hate locations – there's so much you can't control".

== Plot ==
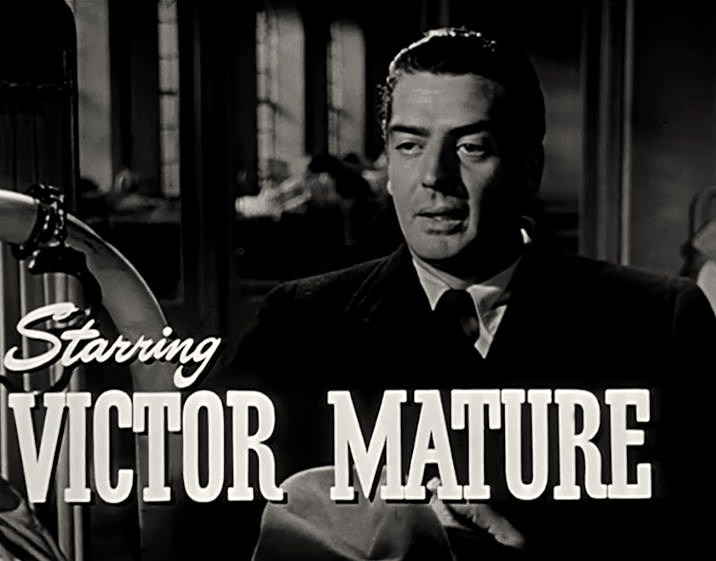
Victor Mature as Lt. Vittorio Candella

Martin Rome (Richard Conte) is confined under guard in a hospital room awaiting surgery. He was critically wounded in a shootout where he killed a police officer. At the hospital, he is visited by family members, a priest and his girlfriend, Teena Ricante. Rome is also interviewed by police detectives Lt. Vittorio Candella (Victor Mature) and Lt. Jim Collins.

The detectives question Rome about a jewel robbery and murder; another man is awaiting execution for the murder. Candella and Rome had been childhood friends from the same poor Italian-American neighborhood. Now Candella hates him for becoming a criminal. Rome denies any role in those crimes.

Rome is also visited by W. A. Niles, a lawyer. He attempts to coerce Rome into confessing to the jewel robbery, threatening to harm Teena. When Niles returns for another visit, Rome attempts to strangle him. Concerned about Teena, Rome convinces his nurse to hide Teena in her apartment.

After Rome's surgery, the police transfer him to the prison hospital ward to recover. While there, Rome escapes with the help of a trusty (Walter Baldwin). Rome goes to Niles's office and demands money so that he and Teena can leave the United States. When Niles opens his safe, Rome spots the stolen jewels there. He forces Niles to identify the female accomplice in the robbery, a masseuse named Rose Givens. Niles then grabs a gun from his desk drawer and the two men struggle. Niles accidentally shoots and kills his receptionist before Rome finally stabs him to death. He takes the jewels, leaves Niles's office and enters a subway station, stowing them in a locker.

Feverish and exhausted by the struggle with Niles, Rome travels to his parents' apartment. Although Rome's father has rejected him, his teenage brother Tony worships him. His mother tells him he must leave. Rome asks Tony to steal money from her for him, but he refuses. While their mother is preparing food for Rome, Candella shows up at the apartment. As he is about to search the place, Rome appears, pointing a gun at him. Rome then runs out of the building. Before leaving, Candella warns Tony about following in his brother's criminal ways.

For his next stop, Rome visits a former girlfriend, Brenda Martingale. He wants her to find Rose's address. However, due to his festering wound, Rome passes out. Brenda finds an unlicensed foreign doctor to come treat him. After Rome awakes and regains his strength, she drives him to Rose's apartment. Meeting Rose, Rome offers her the jewels in exchange for "five thousand dollars, a car, a way out of the country and a good night's sleep".

Rose goes out to obtain the money and transportation for Rome. The plan is that they will meet at the subway station, where he will exchange the jewels for the money and plane tickets. After she leaves, Rome calls Candella and tells him to come to the subway station. At the station, Rome meets Rose. He demands the cash, but she wants the jewels first. When the police arrive, she tries to shoot Rome, but wounds Candella instead. During the chaos, Rome eludes the police.

After being treated at the hospital, Candella finds out that Teena is at a local church. In the meantime, Rome meets Teena there. He asks her to go away with him, but she refuses. At that point Candella arrives and disarms him at gunpoint. Realizing that Candella is too weak to chase him, Rome just starts walking down the street. Candella shoots him in the back, killing him. Tony arrives on the scene to see his brother die.

== Cast ==
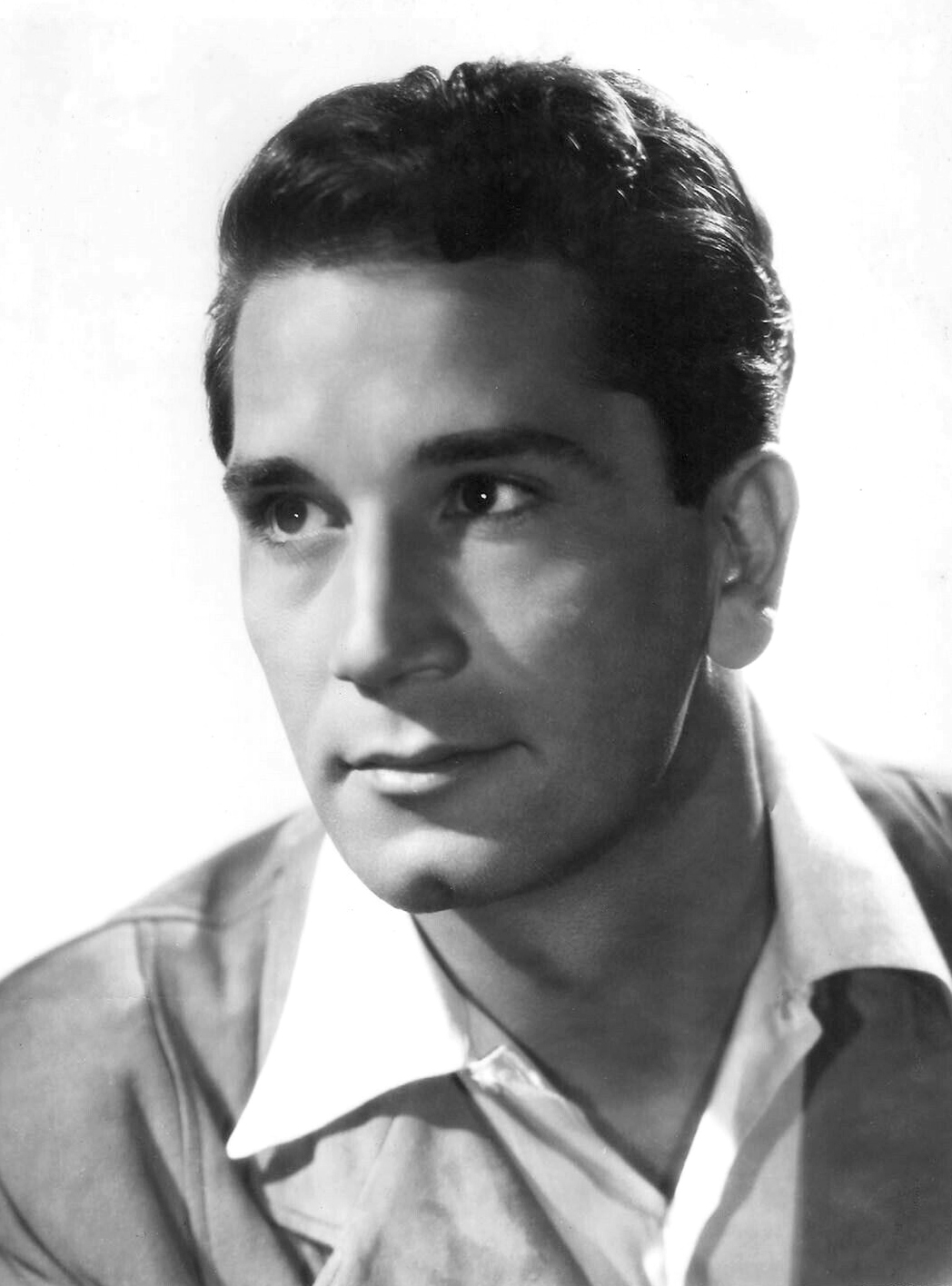
Richard Conte as Martin Rome

- Victor Mature as Lt. Vittorio Candella
- Richard Conte as Martin Rome
- Fred Clark as Lt. Jim Collins
- Shelley Winters as Brenda Martingale
- Betty Garde as Nurse Frances Pruett
- Berry Kroeger as W. A. Niles
- Tommy Cook as Tony Rome
- Debra Paget as Teena Ricante
- Hope Emerson as Rose Givens
- Roland Winters as Ledbetter
- Walter Baldwin as Orvy
- June Storey as Miss Boone
- Tito Vuolo as Papa Rome
- Mimi Aguglia as Mama Rome
- Konstantin Shayne as Dr. Veroff
- Howard Freeman as Sullivan
- Joan Miller as Vera
- Dolores Castle as Rosa
- Kathleen Howard as Miss Pruett's Mother

== Production ==
Director Robert Siodmak was loaned from Universal for this motion picture. Filming took place on location in New York City, originally under the title Law and Martin Rome.

== Reception ==
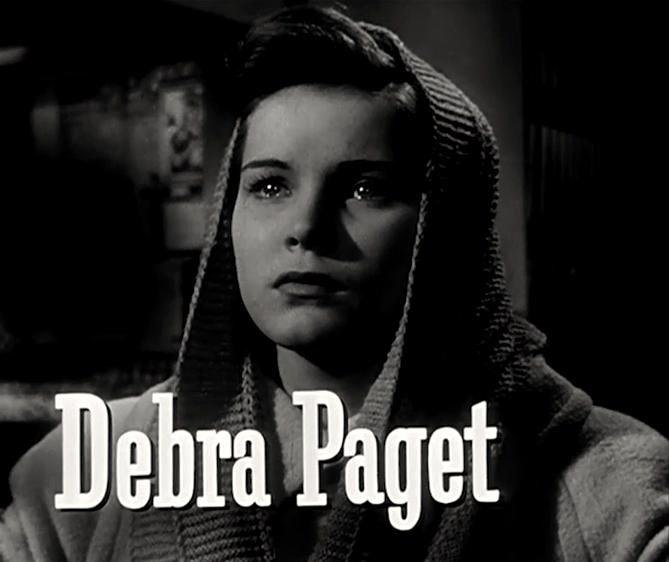
Debra Paget as Teena Ricante

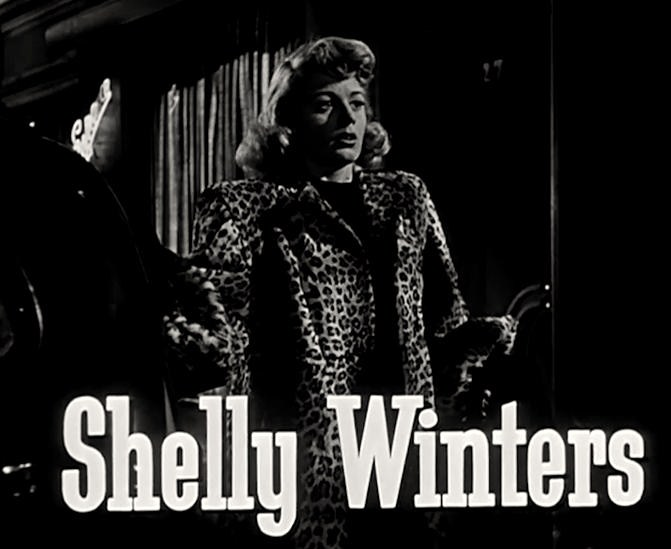
Shelly Winters as Brenda Martingale

Variety listed Cry of the City as a box office disappointment.

When the film was released, The New York Times praised it as "taut and grimly realistic". The review praised the performances as "thoroughly effective", and said that "Victor Mature, an actor once suspected of limited talents, turns in a thoroughly satisfying job as the sincere and kindly cop, who not only knows his business but the kind of people he is tracking down".

The staff at Variety magazine liked Cry of the City and wrote,

"The hard-hitting suspense of the chase formula is given topnotch presentation in Cry of the City. It's an exciting motion picture, credibly put together to wring out every bit of strong action and tension inherent in such a plot. Robert Siodmak's penchant for shaping melodramatic excitement that gets through to an audience is realistically carried out in this one".

The Brooklyn Eagle was impressed:

“No pale carbon copy or stale rehashing of stale matters…top-notch melodrama, well written, well played, down to the smallest role, and handled with maximum know-how by…Siodmak….Instead of…casting Mature as the gangster and…Conte as the detective, they reversed the roles and the gamble paid off….The opening really is the opening. Conte recovers, escapes from prison…and the movie turns into one long manhunt, skilfully sustained.”

Cry of the City has been highly praised by modern critics. They view it as an important example of the film noir genre. The Time Out Film Guide praises the realistic look and feel of the city:

"Rarely has the cruel, lived-in squalor of the city been presented in such telling detail, both in the vivid portrayal of ghetto life and in the astonishing parade of corruption uncovered in the night (a slug-like shyster; a monstrous, sadistic masseuse; a sleazy refugee abortionist, etc.)".

Raymond Borde and Etienne Chaumeton, writing in A Panorama of American Film Noir 1941–1953, comments that director Siodmak had better noir efforts, but the film does have one lasting image,

"Siodmak will rediscover neither the brilliance of The Killers nor the 'finish' of Criss Cross in the over-rushed, too uneven, Cry of the City: for all that, one will remember the figure of a forever famished masseuse, a real 'phallic woman' who, with a flick of the wrists, has a 'tough guy' at her mercy".

In Film Noir: The Dark Side of the Screen, Foster Hirsch said that Siodmak's characters "are nurtured by their obsessions". The Candella character, "as Colin McArthur notes in Underworld USA, 'hunts his quarry with an almost metaphysical hatred'".

Hirsch describes Rome's innocence in the jewel robbery, despite his criminal background, as an "ironic variation on the wrong man theme" of some film noir movies. "Branded for a crime he did not commit, the Conte character becomes a true criminal, enmeshed in a web from which there is no escape".

== Soundtrack ==
The musical score of Cry of the City is Alfred Newman's "Street Scene". The score had been first used in the 1931 film Street Scene and was employed in other big-city gangster pictures of that era.
