= Operation Cross Eagles =

1968 action thriller film

- Directed by: Richard Conte
- Written by: Lilly Diamond; Vincent Fotre; Ika Panajotovic; Vincent Fotre
- Produced by: Ika Panajotovic
- Starring: Richard Conte; Rory Calhoun; Aili King
- Cinematography: Nenad Jovicic
- Edited by: Milanka Nanovic
- Release date: 1968
- Running time: 90 minutes
- Country: Yugoslavia
- Languages: English; German

Operation Cross Eagles or American Cross Eagles is an action thriller set during the Second World War. The mid-budget film was made in 1968 and was directed by Richard Conte (his only time as a Director) who stars in the film alongside Rory Calhoun.

The film is largely filmed on location in Yugoslavia.

== Plot ==
An American military courier, a captain, is captured in Yugoslavia during the Second World War. He is rumoured to carry the plans for the Allied invasion and capture of the Balkans, known as Operation Cross Eagles. His courteous captor is Rear Admiral Von Vogels (Relja Basic).

A small group of American commandoes, led by Lt Bradford, are sent to capture a German colonel (Col. Streich) in order to exchange him for the courier.

The Yugoslavian authorities become aware of the plan.

Bradford and McAfee enter the Nazi-held fort dressed as monks, and pretend to sell fruit. As they are discovered their troop open fire. They successfully capture Col. Streich.

The colonel is left in a lagoon on the Adriatic to be picked up by Nazi troops.

Bradford and McAfee infiltrate the villa where the British captain is held by Admiral von Vogels. Cpl Bell (Demeter Bitenc) betrays the Americans and tries to stop them taking the Admiral. Once captured they explain the rumour of Operation Cross Eagles was just a smoke-screen and all they actually wanted was the admiral.

== Cast ==
- Richard Conte as Lt. Bradford
- Rory Calhoun as Sgt. Sean McAfee
- Relja Basic as Admiral von Vogels
- Aili King as Anna
- Rada Djuricin as Fulda
- Phil Brown as Sgt. Turley
- Demeter Bitenc as Cpl. Bell
