= Love Island (1952 film) =

1952 film by Bud Pollard

- Film poster
- Directed by: Bud Pollard
- Written by: John E. Gordon (story); Daniel Kusell (screenplay)
- Produced by: Harold Kussell (associate producer); Hall Shelton (producer)
- Narrated by: André Baruch
- Cinematography: George F. Hinners
- Edited by: Bud Pollard
- Music by: Alfonso Corelli
- Distributed by: Astor Pictures Corporation
- Release date: July 16, 1952
- Running time: 66 minutes
- Country: United States
- Language: English

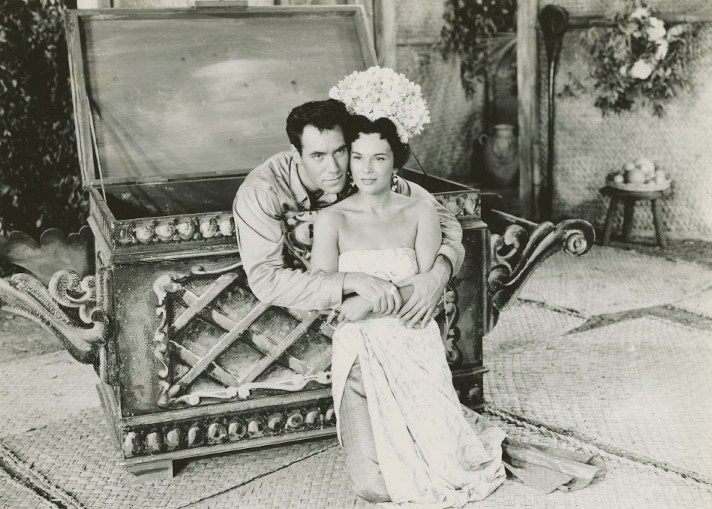
Paul Valentine and Eva Gabor

Love Island is a 1952 American film directed by Bud Pollard and starring Paul Valentine and Eva Gabor. Originally released in Cinecolor, the film includes extensive footage of Bali from Legong: Dance of the Virgins (1935). Love Island is Pollard's final film as a director.

== Plot ==
Navigator Lt. Taber relates how he parachuted from his damaged plane onto the island of Tuba Tara (Love Island), where he fell in love with a beautiful woman named Sarna.

== Cast ==
- Paul Valentine as Lt. Richard Taber
- Eva Gabor as Sarna
- Malcolm Lee Beggs as Uraka
- Frank McNellis as Aryuna
- Dean Norton as Tamor
- Kathryn Chang as Klepon
- Bruno Wick as Ninga
- Richard W. Shankland as Fumanku
- Howard Blaine as Capt. Blake
- Vicki Marsden as Stewardess

== Soundtrack ==
- "Across the Sea", written by Jerry Bragin
- "Love at First Sight", written by Bragin and sung by Paul Valentine

== See also ==
- Goona-goona epic
