= The Raging Tide =

1951 film by George Sherman

- Theatrical release poster
- Directed by: George Sherman
- Screenplay by: Ernest K. Gann
- Based on: Fiddler's Green
- Produced by: Aaron Rosenberg
- Starring: Shelley Winters; Richard Conte; Stephen McNally; Charles Bickford; Alex Nicol
- Cinematography: Russell Metty
- Edited by: Ted J. Kent
- Music by: Frank Skinner
- Color process: Black and white
- Production company: Universal Pictures
- Distributed by: Universal Pictures
- Release date: December 7, 1951 (Los Angeles)
- Running time: 93 minutes
- Country: United States
- Language: English

The Raging Tide is a 1951 American crime film noir directed by George Sherman and starring Shelley Winters, Richard Conte, Stephen McNally, Charles Bickford and Alex Nicol. The screenplay was written by Ernest K. Gann based on his 1950 novel Fiddler's Green.

== Plot ==
San Francisco crime boss Bruno Felkin kills a mob rival and then tries to arrange an alibi with his girlfriend Connie Thatcher. However, Connie is not available, which forces Felkin to hide on a fishing boat owned by Hamil Linder until she appears. Felkin tries to enlist Linder's son Carl to perform work for him until the police stop their search. Felkin and Connie are gradually reformed by the decency and humanity of the Linder family. A cop named Kelsey continues to pursue Felkin.

== Cast ==
- Shelley Winters as Connie Thatcher
- Richard Conte as Bruno Felkin
- Stephen McNally as Lt. Kelsey
- Charles Bickford as Hamil Linder
- Alex Nicol as Carl Linder+
- John McIntire as Corky Mullins
- Tito Vuolo as Barney Schriona
- Chubby Johnson as "General" Ball
- Minerva Urecal as Johnnie Mae Swanson

== Production ==
During filming at the Universal Pictures studio, large numbers of seagulls flew into the soundstage and interrupted filming, attracted by the three tons of halibut, albacore and other fish that had been transported from San Francisco as props for waterfront scenes.

== Reception ==
Critic John L. Scott of the Los Angeles Times wrote: "Gann's screen play has its moments—at the start and at the finish—but seems to sag in the middle. The author builds up a state of mental confusion in his main character (the gangster) and this is passed on to the spectator, who may flounder a bit before Conte is regenerated and sacrifices himself as a do-gooder."

== See also ==
- List of American films of 1951
