= Paul Valentine =

American actor in 20th century

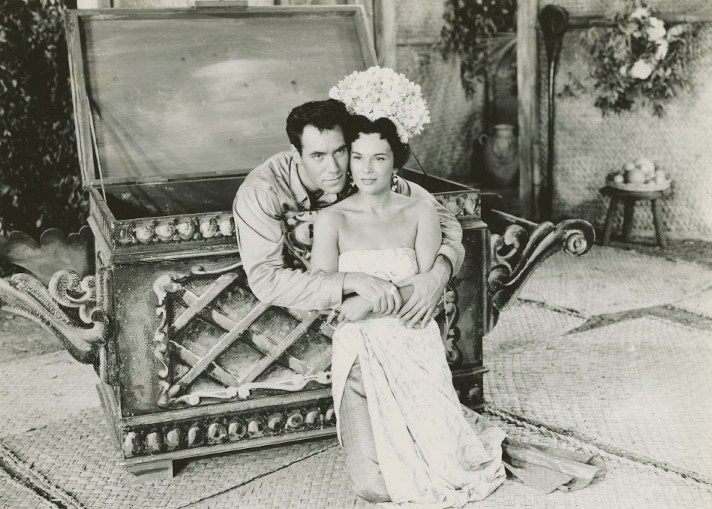
- Born: William Daixel; March 23, 1919; New York City, U.S.
- Died: January 27, 2006 (aged 86); Los Angeles, California, U.S.
- Resting place: Hollywood Forever Cemetery
- Other names: Val Valentinoff; Vladimir Valentinov
- Occupations: Film and television actor
- Years active: 1947–1984
- Spouse(s): Flevur Ali Khan (1952–2006); Lili St. Cyr (1946–1949; divorced)

Paul Valentine (born William Daixel; March 23, 1919 – January 27, 2006) was an American film and television actor. He was married to Lili St. Cyr from 1946 to 1950 and danced opposite her on stage.

== Biography ==
Born in New York City he was educated at P.S. 40 and the Central Commercial High School.

He began his career at the age of 14 with the Ballet Russe de Monte Carlo, and later used the names Val Valentinoff and Vladimir Valentinov with the Fokine Ballet and Mordkin Ballet.

From 1937 he made his Broadway debut in Virginia, then appeared in theatre, TV, and night clubs. In 1944 he met Lili St. Cyr and choreographed her act, the pair marrying in Tijuana in 1946.

He debuted in motion pictures in 1947 in Out of the Past; his penultimate film appearance was in 1984's remake of that film.

Valentine had at least one engagement as a nightclub singer in 1950, singing baritone and receiving a favorable review in The Billboard.

Valentine was married twice, including to burlesque stripteaser Lili St. Cyr from 1946 to 1949. He previously had a relationship with Sally Rand.

He died in Los Angeles, California, on January 27, 2006, aged 86.

== Filmography ==
- Out of the Past (1947, originally released in UK as Build My Gallows High) - Joe
- House of Strangers (1949) - Pietro Monetti
- Love Happy (1949) - Mike Johnson
- Lights Out (episode: "The Silent Supper"; 1951) - Jean Duval
- Something to Live For (1952) - Albert Forest
- Armstrong Circle Theatre (episode: "The Shoes That Laughed" (1952))
- Love Island (1952) - Lt. Richard Taber
- Naked City (episode: "Susquehanna 4-7568"; 1958) - Larry
- Golden Showcase (episode: "Tonight in Samarkand"; 1962) - Angelo
- Vega$ (1978, TV Series) - Minister
- The Ropers (1980, TV Series) - Maitre'D
- The Man Who Saw Tomorrow (1981) - the Secretary of State
- All Night Long (1981) - Customer
- True Confessions (1981) - Detective #2
- Pennies from Heaven (1981) - Bar Patron #1
- Yes, Giorgio (1982) - Timur
- Quincy M.E. (1983, TV Series) - George Carlton Ward
- Against All Odds (1984) - Councilman Weinberg
- Lovelines (1984) - Mr. Van Der Meer
