= Tito Vuolo =

American actor

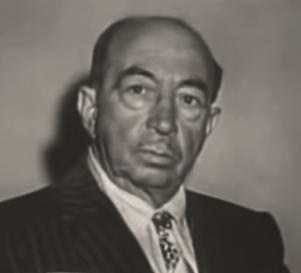
- Vuolo in the television series The Lawless Years, 1959
- Born: 22 March 1893; Gragnano, Italy
- Died: 14 September 1962 (aged 69); Los Angeles, California, United States
- Occupation: Actor

Tito Vuolo (22 March 1893 – 14 September 1962) was an Italian-born American actor, best known for his supporting work playing often stereotypical Italian characters. Prior to his film career, he toured the United States as a stage actor. His wife was Grazia "Grace" Vuolo.

Vuolo was born in Gragnano, Campania, Italy, and died in Los Angeles, California.

== Partial filmography ==
- 1941 Shadow of the Thin Man as Luis, Waiter Pushing Sea Bass (uncredited)
- 1947 Out of the Blue as Mario, Proprietor (uncredited)
- 1947 The Web as Emilio Canepa
- 1947 Kiss of Death as Luigi (uncredited)
- 1947 Mourning Becomes Electra as Joe Silva
- 1947 The Bishop's Wife as Maggenti
- 1947 Daisy Kenyon as Dino (uncredited)
- 1947 T-Men as Pasquale, Hotel Proprietor (uncredited)
- 1948 B.F.'s Daughter as Mario, Speakeasy Waiter (uncredited)
- 1948 Mr. Blandings Builds His Dream House as Mr. Zucca
- 1948 I Wouldn't Be in Your Shoes as Campana, The Grocer
- 1948 Sorry, Wrong Number as Albert, The Waiter (uncredited)
- 1948 The Luck of the Irish as Italian Vendor (uncredited)
- 1948 Cry of the City as Papa Roma (uncredited)
- 1948 When My Baby Smiles at Me as Proprietor (uncredited)
- 1949 Flamingo Road as Pete Ladas
- 1949 The Fountainhead as Pasquale Orsini (uncredited)
- 1949 House of Strangers as Lucca
- 1949 The Great Gatsby as Mavromichaelis
- 1949 The Red Danube as Italian Billposter (uncredited)
- 1949 Everybody Does It as Makeup Man
- 1950 The Petty Girl as Faustini, Head Waiter (uncredited)
- 1950 Between Midnight and Dawn as Romano
- 1950 Deported as Postal Clerk
- 1950 Southside 1-1000 as Babo, Storekeeper (uncredited)
- 1950 The Man Who Cheated Himself as Pietro Capa
- 1951 The Mating Season as Industrialist At Venetian Hotel (uncredited)
- 1951 The Enforcer as Tony Vetto
- 1951 Up Front as Tarantino
- 1951 The Great Caruso as Pietro Toscano (uncredited)
- 1951 Saturday's Hero as Manuel
- 1951 The Racket as Tony, Nick's Barber
- 1951 The Raging Tide as Barney Schriona
- 1952 Somebody Loves Me as Harry, The Barber (uncredited)
- 1952 Stars and Stripes Forever as Tony Rector (uncredited)
- 1953 My Friend Superman (TV Series) as Tony
- 1954 Phantom of the Rue Morgue as Pignatelli, Tenant (uncredited)
- 1955 Young at Heart as Italian Husband (uncredited)
- 1955 Six Bridges to Cross as Angie
- 1955 The Racers as Mechanic (uncredited)
- 1955 It's Always Fair Weather as Silvio (uncredited)
- 1955 The McConnell Story as Italian Grocer (uncredited)
- 1955 Sincerely Yours as Italian Restaurant Proprietor (uncredited)
- 1955 Hell on Frisco Bay as Tony (uncredited)
- 1956 The Killing as Joe 'Piano'
- 1956 Emergency Hospital as Ramon Corden (uncredited)
- 1957 Dragstrip Girl as Papa
- 1957 20 Million Miles to Earth as Commissario Unte
- 1957 The Helen Morgan Story (1957) as Tony (uncredited)
- 1958 Playhouse 90 as Albert Anselmi
- 1959 Some Like It Hot as Mozzarella (uncredited)
- 1959 The Five Pennies as Barber (uncredited)
