= Slaves of Babylon =

1953 film by William Castle

- Directed by: William Castle
- Screenplay by: DeVallon Scott
- Story by: DeVallon Scott
- Produced by: Sam Katzman
- Starring: Richard Conte; Linda Christian
- Cinematography: Henry Freulich
- Edited by: William A. Lyon
- Color process: Technicolor
- Production company: Columbia Pictures
- Distributed by: Columbia Pictures
- Release date: October 1953
- Running time: 82 minutes
- Country: United States
- Language: English

Slaves of Babylon is a 1953 American adventure film directed by William Castle and starring Richard Conte and Linda Christian

William Castle called it a "low budget extravaganza".

== Plot ==
In 586 BC the city of Jerusalem was destroyed by the armies of king Nebuchadnezzar and its people were brought captive into Babylon. After decades of subjugation by their Babylonian masters the Jews are crying out for a saviour. The prophet Daniel dispatches Nahum, one of his faithful servants, to search the faraway empire of Media for a young shepherd named Cyrus, who unknowingly is destined to become Cyrus, king of the Persians, who holds the key to the freedom of the Jewish people.

== Cast ==
- Richard Conte as Nahum
- Linda Christian as Panthea
- Maurice Schwartz as Daniel
- Terence Kilburn as Cyrus
- Michael Ansara as Belshazzar
- Leslie Bradley as Nebuchadnezzar
- Ruth Storey as Rachel
- John Crawford as General Avil
- Ric Roman as Arrioch
- Robert Griffin as King Astyages
- Beatrice Maude as Cyrus' Foster Mother
- Wheaton Chambers as Cyrus' Foster Father
- Paul Purcell as Overseer
- Julie Newmar as Dancer-Assassin (as Julie Newmeyer)

== Production ==
The film was announced by Katzman in November 1951. It was part of an eight-film slate he was making at Columbia, others including Prince of Pirates with Paul Henreid, Serpent of the Nile, Cairo to Suez, Jack McCall, Desperado, The Pathfinder, Siren of Bagdad and Flame of Calcutta.

In January 1952 the film was formally put on the schedule. It was part of the early 50s boom in Biblical era pictures. In May Kaztman said the film would start in November.

In July Richard Conte was announced as Nahum.

In October 1952 it was announced Richard Conte's wife Ruth would make her film debut in the movie under the name "Ruth Storey" and that Linda Christian would also appear. The same month Katzman said William Castle would direct following Conquest of Cochise.
