= Enterprise Productions =

Film production company

Enterprise Productions, Inc. (otherwise known as The Enterprise Studios) was an independent production company co-founded by actor John Garfield alongside producers David L. Loew and Charles Einfeld in 1946, right after Garfield's contract with Warner Bros. had expired. Having recently turned freelance, the idea was Garfield's outlet in obtaining creative control over his own projects, as well as encouraging fellow filmmakers to pursue their own humanistic advocacies through their work.

Garfield made two films with Enterprise: Body and Soul (1947) and Force of Evil (1948). Other productions include Arch of Triumph (1948), starring Ingrid Bergman and Charles Boyer; and Caught (1949), directed by Max Ophüls and starring James Mason and Barbara Bel Geddes.

During its existence, Enterprise had its films distributed in the United States by United Artists from 1947 to mid-1948; with Metro-Goldwyn-Mayer (MGM) distributing the films in select countries overseas. After the box office disappointment from Arch of Triumph, UA severed ties with Enterprise and the last four films were outright distributed by MGM.

Eventually, after the box-office failure that Force of Evil brought (as well as Garfield's trouble with the House Un-American Activities Committee), Enterprise folded in 1949. The film Caught was its last production. The careers of Robert Rossen, the director of Body and Soul, and Abraham Polonsky, director of Force of Evil, were seriously affected by HUAC.

Following the bankruptcy of Enterprise, the ownership of all of its films were acquired by Bank of America for non-payment of loans, and subsequently sold to Mundus Television in 1954 for television broadcast at a reported total of $45 million. Eventually the rights have been transferred to National Telefilm Associates (NTA), which re-branded itself as Republic Pictures. Currently, the entire Enterprise catalog is owned by Paramount Skydance, whose Melange Pictures holding unit owns the former library of predecessor-in-interest Republic Pictures, while Paramount Pictures distributes.

== Select films ==
- Ramrod (1947)
- The Other Love (1947)
- Body and Soul (1947)
- Four Faces West (1948)
- Arch of Triumph (1948)
- So This Is New York (1948)
- No Minor Vices (1948)
- Force of Evil (1948)
- Caught (1949)
