= Aldo Sambrell =

Spanish actor (1931–2010)

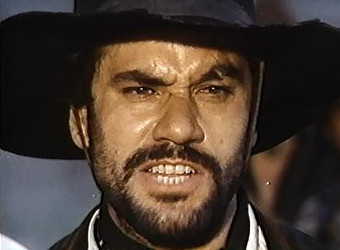
- Aldo Sambrell in Navajo Joe (1966)
- Born: Alfredo Sánchez Brell; 23 February 1931; Vallecas, Spain
- Died: 10 July 2010 (aged 79); Alicante, Spain
- Occupations: Actor, Director, Producer
- Years active: 1961–2004
- Spouse: Cándida López Cano (m. 1964; died 2010)
- Children: Alfredo Xavier Sánchez Cavaleiro

Alfredo Sánchez Brell (23 February 1931 – 10 July 2010), known as Aldo Sambrell, was a Spanish actor, director, and producer who appeared in over 150 films between 1961 and 1996.

== Biography ==
Sambrell was born in Vallecas on 23 February 1931. He travelled to Mexico because his parents were exiled there, beginning a football career in Puebla F.C., where he was known as Madrileño Sánchez, and also in C.F. Monterrey. When he returned to Spain he played for Alcoyano and Rayo Vallecano, and finally worked as an actor.

== Career ==
Sambrell was best known in the world of cinema for his roles as henchmen in Sergio Leone's Spaghetti Western films, portraying gang members in the trilogy of films A Fistful of Dollars (1964), For a Few Dollars More, (1965) and The Good, the Bad and the Ugly (1966), as well as in Once Upon a Time in the West (1968), and 100 Rifles (1969). He also acted in many other westerns, including Sergio Corbucci's Navajo Joe (1966), played the part of firing squad leader in A Fistful of Dynamite (1971), and a member of Sinbad's crew in The Golden Voyage of Sinbad (1973). He also appeared alongside Jackie Chan in Armour of God 2: Operation Condor (1991), playing a villain, and in several international productions as an extra or bit actor, including Doctor Zhivago (1965) and The Wind and the Lion (1975).

He died in Alicante, Spain on 10 July 2010 from a cerebral infarction, at age 79, the result of three strokes he suffered in early June. He was cremated and his ashes were spread on Fort Bravo, Tabernas.

He was married to Cándida López Cano (1936-2013) in 1964, with whom he had a son, and Sergio Leone was his best man. She died on 25 September 2013.

== Filmography ==
- King of Kings (1961) – Judea Soldier (uncredited)
- Implacable Three (1963) – Hombre de Bardon
- Gunfight at Red Sands (1963) – Juan Guardo
- Gunfighters of Casa Grande (1964) – Rojo, Bandit Chief
- Gunfight at High Noon (1964) – Palmer Henchman
- Fuera de la ley (1964) – Sheriff
- Apache Fury (1964) – Secuaz de Burt (uncredited)
- A Fistful of Dollars (1964) – Dougy, Rojo gang member
- Texas Ranger (1964) – Carson
- La tumba del pistolero (1964) – Minero
- Doomed Fort (1964) – James
- Adventures of the Bengal Lancers (1964) – Gamal / Sikki Dharma
- 100 Horsemen (1964) – Alfaqui (uncredited)
- Saul e David (1964)
- Relevo para un pistolero (1964) – Gordon
- Finger on the Trigger (1965)
- The Hell of Manitoba (1965) – Jake
- Son of a Gunfighter (1965) – Juan Morales, Bandit Chief
- La magnifica sfida (1965) – Kames
- In a Colt's Shadow (1965) – Ramirez
- For a Few Dollars More (1965) – Cuchillo (Indio's Gang)
- Doctor Zhivago (1965) – (uncredited)
- Fuerte perdido (1965)
- One Hundred Thousand Dollars for Lassiter (1966) – Rick, Martin Henchman
- Lost Command (1966) – Ibrahim
- Dynamite Jim (1966) – Slate
- The Sea Pirate (1966) – Le marin 'La bombarde'
- The Texican (1966) – Gil Rio
- Navajo Joe (1966) – Mervyn 'Vee' Duncan
- Il grande colpo di Surcouf (1966) – Le marin 'La Bombarde'
- The Good, the Bad and the Ugly (1966) – Member of Angel Eyes' Gang
- A Bullet for the General (1967) – Lieutenant Alvaro Ferreira
- The Hellbenders (1967) – Pedro
- The Long Duel (1967) – Prem
- Face to Face (1967) – Zachary Shawn
- 15 Scaffolds for a Murderer (1967) – Danny / Bud Lee
- Train for Durango (1968) – Captain of Mexican Army
- Superargo and the Faceless Giants (1968) – Kamir / Pao-Ki
- A Long Ride from Hell (1968) – Mexican Bounty Hunter
- A Minute to Pray, a Second to Die (1968) – Jesús María (uncredited)
- Requiem for a Gringo (1968) – Charley Fair
- Giugno '44 – Sbarcheremo in Normandia (1968)
- Once Upon a Time in the West (1968) – Cheyenne's Lieutenant (uncredited)
- White Comanche (1968) – (uncredited)
- Colpo sensazionale al servizio del Sifar (1968) – Scarabesca
- 100 Rifles (1969) – Sergeant Paletes
- Battle of the Commandos (1969) – Sergeant Karim Habinda
- Tristana (1970) – (uncredited)
- Manos torpes (1970)
- Arizona Colt Returns (1970) – Chico
- Cannon for Cordoba (1970) – Ortega (uncredited)
- When Heroes Die (1970) – James
- Kill Django... Kill First (1971) – Burton
- A Town Called Hell (1971) – Calebra
- The Last Run (1971) – Miguel
- The Light at the Edge of the World (1971) – Tarcante
- Duck, You Sucker! (1971) – Mexican Officer (member of the firing squad) (uncredited)
- Hannie Caulder (1971) – Mexican Soldier (uncredited)
- Bad Man's River (1971) – Canales
- Kill (1971) – Carcopino
- Su le mani, cadavere! Sei in arresto (1971) – Lee Grayton
- Rain for a Dusty Summer (1971) – Colonel Marinos
- Ben and Charlie (1972) – Sheriff Walkers (uncredited)
- Antony and Cleopatra (1972) – Ventidius
- Treasure Island (1972) – Israel Hands
- Travels with My Aunt (1972) – Hakim's Assistant (uncredited)
- Partirono preti, tornarono... curati (1973) – Commanding officer on the train shouting out of the windows (uncredited)
- Charley One-Eye (1973) – Mexican Driver
- Shaft in Africa (1973) – Angelo
- The Man Called Noon (1973) – Kissling
- The Golden Voyage of Sinbad (1973) – Omar
- Vudú sangriento (1974) – Guedé Nibo
- La loba y la Paloma (1974) – Atrilio
- La dynamite est bonne à boire (1974)
- The Wind and the Lion (1975) – Ugly Arab
- La última jugada (1975) – Alan Randall
- Atraco en la jungla (1976) – Inspector Ramirez
- A mí qué me importa que explote Miami (1976)
- The Black Pearl (1977) – Sailor
- El perro (1977) – Omar Romero
- Silver Saddle (1978) – Garrincha
- Süpermenler (1979) – Baba Jackson
- Missile X: The Neutron Bomb Incident (1979) – George
- Savana violenza carnale (1979)
- Caboblanco (1980) – Policeman
- Monster (1980) – Carlos
- Matar para vivir (1980)
- Cuatro locos buscan manicomio (1980) – Estranguloni
- L'ultimo harem (1981) – Bedouin Chief (uncredited)
- La leyenda del tambor (1981) – General Schwartz
- Las muñecas del King Kong (1981) – Damian
- Messo comunale praticamente spione (1982) – Romolo Rossi
- Kapax del Amazonas (1982)
- Los diablos del mar (1982) – Negoro
- Biancaneve & Co. (1982) – Re Agesilao
- Satan's Baby Doll (1982) – Antonio Aguilar
- Black Commando (1982) – Colonel Montano
- Al oeste de Río Grande (1983) – Juan Sanchez
- I padroni del mondo (1983)
- Tuareg – The Desert Warrior (1984) – Sergeant Malick
- Goma-2 (1984) – Picot
- Yellow Hair and the Fortress of Gold (1984) – Flores
- Héctor, el estigma del miedo (1984) – Padre de Héctor
- Roma. L'antica chiave dei sensi (1984)
- Mon ami Washington (1984)
- Tex and the Lord of the Deep (1985) – El Dorado
- Hierro dulce (1985)
- La noche de la ira (1986) – Sebastián
- El orden cómico (1986)
- Instant Justice (1986) – Lieutenant Juan Muñoz
- Ahora mis pistolas hablan (1986)
- Ladrón de chatarra (1987)
- El ataque de los pájaros (1987) – Arthur Neilson
- The Rogues (1987) – Il ricettatore (uncredited)
- Abat-jour (1988) – Antonio
- Flavia (1989) – Valerio Augusto
- Al Andalus (1989)
- The Return of the Musketeers (1989) – Burly Demonstrator
- Blood and Sand (1989) – Faustino
- El río que nos lleva (1989)
- Hot Blood (1989) – Don Luis
- Rose Bluelight (1989)
- Commando terrorista (1990)
- Superagentes en Mallorca (1990)
- La cruz de Iberia (1990) – Capitán Guardia Civil
- Armour of God 2: Operation Condor (1991) – Adolf
- Caged – Le prede umane (1991) – Captain Juan
- Narcos (1992) – Boss
- Men of War (1994) – Goldmouth
- Dis-moi oui (1995) – Le grand-père
- Bambola di carne (1995) – Frank / Jenny's fiancé / Lolette's father
- Soldato ignoto (1995) – American soldier
- Killer Barbys (1996) – Arkan
- Aquí llega Condemor, el pecador de la pradera (1996) – Valerio
- Pasajes (1996) – Guarda
- Tender Flesh (1997) – Kallman
- Ma il buon Dio è proprio in gamba? (1998)
- Killer Barbys vs. Dracula (2002) – Pepe Morgan
- Flesh for the Beast (2003) – Alfred Fischer
- Legami sporchi (2004) – Tito
