= Wellington Square =

Wellington Square may refer to:

- Wellington Square, North Adelaide, South Australia
- Wellington Square, Perth, in Western Australia
- A neighbourhood in Burlington, Ontario, Canada
- A square in Kolkata, India, renamed Subodh Chandra Mallik Square
- A square in Ayr, in south-west Scotland
- Wellington Square, Oxford, England
- Wellington Square, Chelsea, a garden square in Chelsea, London
- A square in Hastings, on the south coast of England
- Wellington Square (MBTA station), Medford, Massachusetts, US
- Wellington Square, Los Angeles, in California, US
