= Caroline Munro =

English actress and model (born 1949)

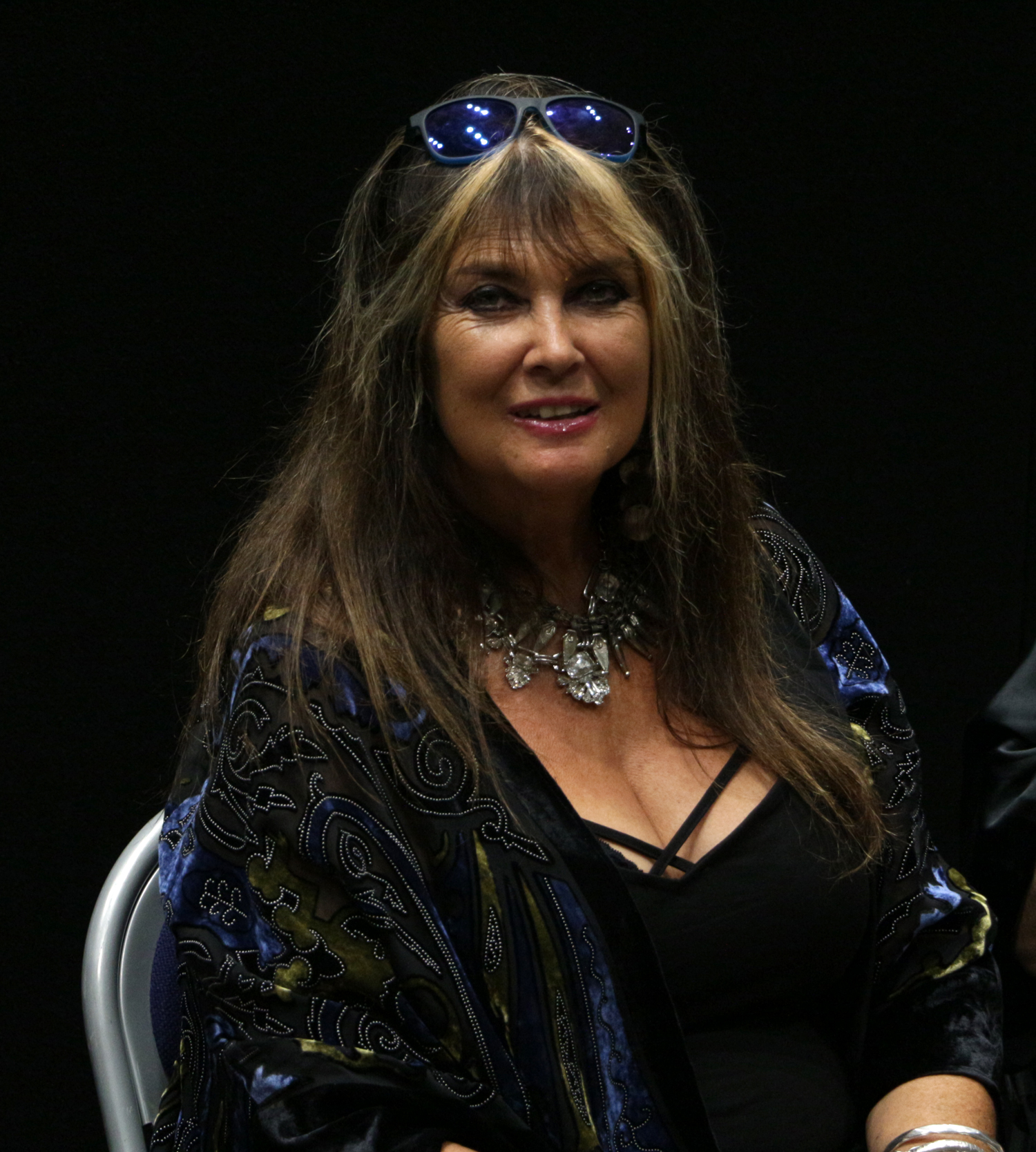
- Munro at the Glasgow Film and Comic Con (2018)
- Born: Caroline Jane Munro; 16 January 1949 (age 77); Windsor, Berkshire, England
- Occupations: Actress; model; singer
- Years active: 1966–present
- Spouses: Judd Hamilton (m. 1970; div. 1982) George Dugdale (m. 1990; died 2020)
- Children: 2
- Website: carolinemunro.org

Caroline Jane Munro (/mənˈroʊ/ mən-ROH; born 16 January 1949) is an English actress, model and singer known for her many appearances in horror, science fiction and action films of the 1970s and 1980s. She gained prominence within Hammer and horror circles, starring in Dracula AD 1972 (1972) and Captain Kronos – Vampire Hunter (1974), garnering a cult following for her films. She also acted in The Golden Voyage of Sinbad (1973) and The Spy Who Loved Me (1977). In 2019, she was inducted into the Rondo Hatton Classic Horror Awards' Monster Kid Hall of Fame.

== Early life, family and education ==
Caroline Jane Munro was born on 16 January 1949 in Windsor, Berkshire, the youngest child of a lawyer and a housewife who were Catholics. As a young child, Munro and her family moved to Richmond-upon-Thames, and she attended a convent school in Rottingdean.

== Career ==
Munro's career began in 1966 when her mother and a photographer friend entered some headshots of her in The Evening News's "Face of the Year" contest:

I wanted to do art. Art was my love. I went to art school in Brighton but I was not very good at it. I just did not know what to do. I had a friend at the college who was studying photography and he needed somebody to photograph and he asked me. Unbeknownst to me, he sent the photographs to a big newspaper in London. The fashion photographer, David Bailey, was conducting a photo contest and my picture won.

— Caroline Munro

This led to modelling work for Vogue magazine at age 17. She moved to London to pursue modelling work and became a cover girl for fashion and television advertisements while there. She landed bit parts in films such as Casino Royale (1967) and Where's Jack? (1969). One of her photo advertisements led to a screen test and a one-year contract with Paramount where she was cast as Richard Widmark's daughter in the comedy western A Talent for Loving (also 1969). Photographs of Munro were used to portray Victoria Regina Phibes, the wife of the title character (played by Vincent Price) in The Abominable Dr Phibes (1971), and its sequel, Dr Phibes Rises Again (1972).

=== Hammer Horror films ===
The chairman of Hammer Films, Sir James Carreras, spotted Munro on a Lamb's Navy Rum poster/billboard. He asked his casting director, James Liggat, to find and screen test her. She was promptly signed to a one-year contract. Her first film for Hammer proved to be a turning point in her career. It was during the making of Dracula AD 1972 (1972) that she decided from this film onward she was a fully-fledged actress. Munro acted in Captain Kronos – Vampire Hunter (1974). Directed by Brian Clemens, she played the barefoot gypsy girl Carla. In Paramount Pictures' DVD commentary, Clemens explains that he envisioned the role as a fiery Raquel Welch-type redhead.

Munro has the distinction of being the only actor ever signed to a long-term contract by Hammer Films. She turned down the lead female roles in Hammer's Dr. Jekyll and Sister Hyde (1971), Frankenstein and the Monster from Hell (1974), the unmade Vampirella, Force 10 from Navarone (1978) and The World Is Full of Married Men (1979) as they all required nudity.

=== The Golden Voyage of Sinbad ===
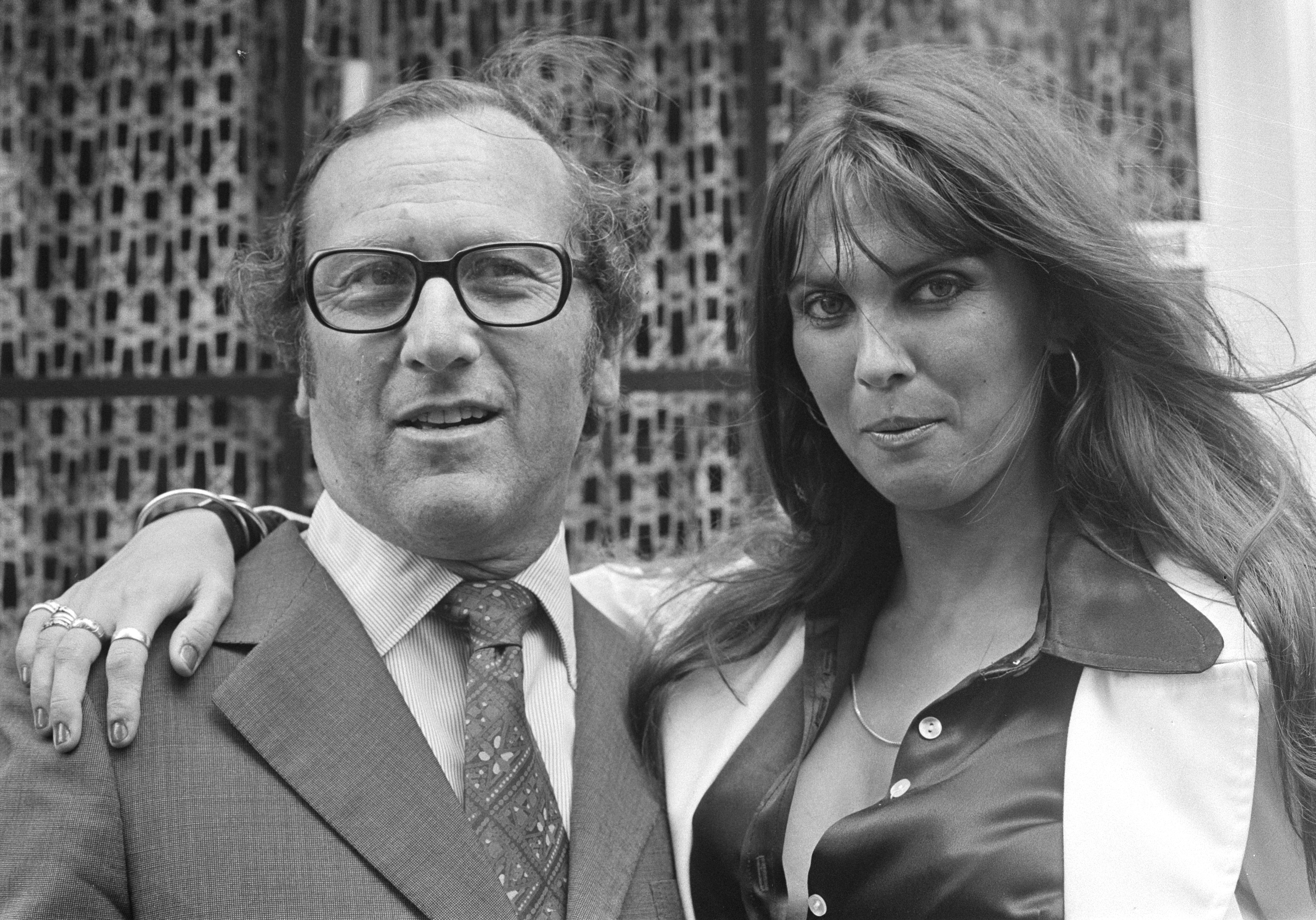
Munro with Charles H. Schneer in Amsterdam during the premiere of The Golden Voyage of Sinbad, July 1974

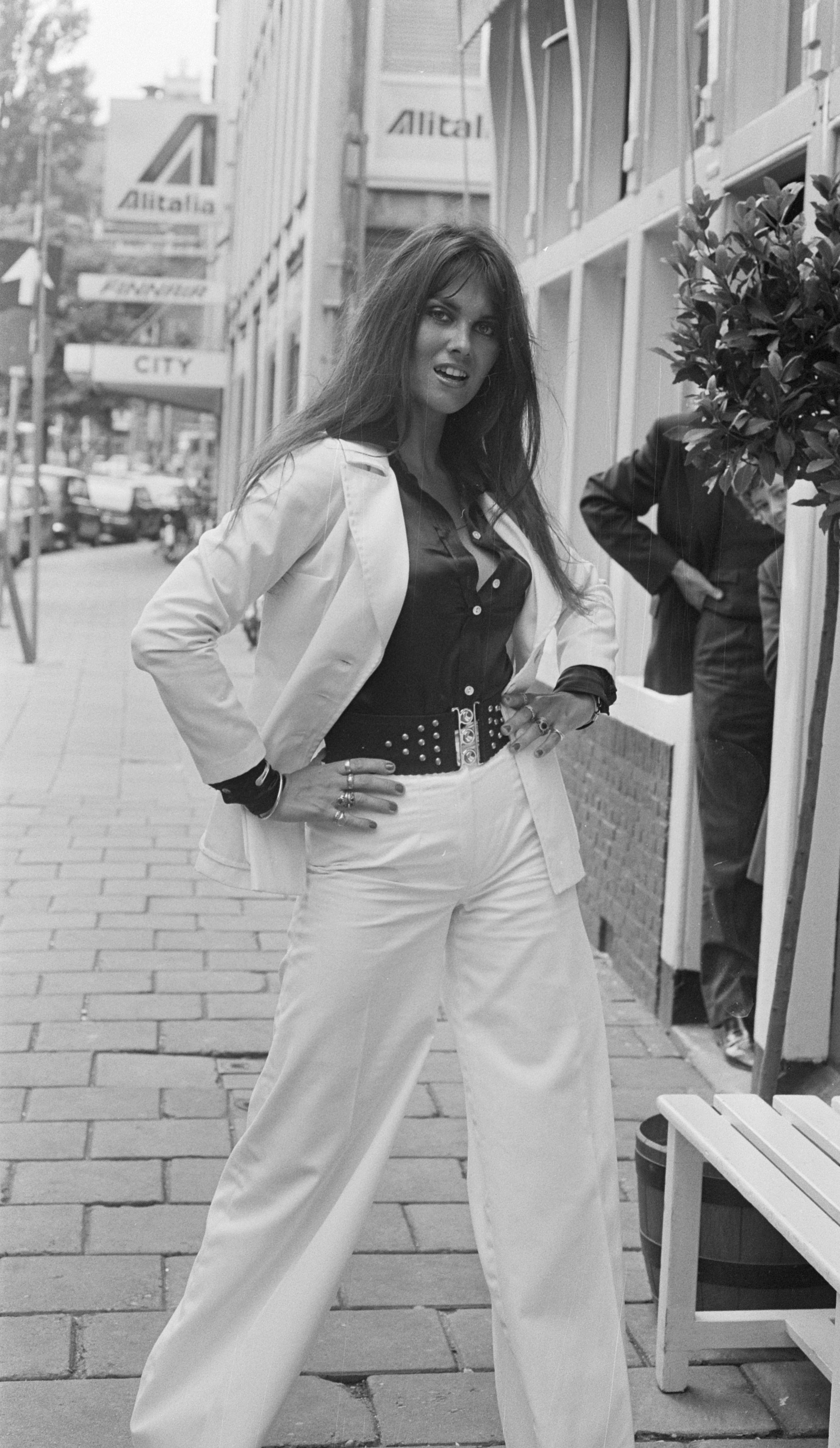
Munro in Amsterdam, July 1974

Brian Clemens helped her to be cast in the role of Margiana, the slave girl in The Golden Voyage of Sinbad (1973).

I got the part – I had been signed by Hammer, for one year, for a contract, out of which I did two films, one being Dracula AD 1972, and the second one being Captain Kronos – Vampire Hunter, which, kind of, would come full-circle, to Sinbad. It was written and directed by Brian Clemens, who wrote the screenplay for The Golden Voyage of Sinbad, so, I was lucky enough to be chosen for Captain Kronos, and they were searching for somebody to do Sinbad, and they wanted a big name, somebody American, or well-known, but Brian said 'No'. He kept lobbying Charles Schneer [producer] and Ray Harryhausen – saying: 'I think you should come and look at the rushes, and see what you think, because I think she's right.' So, they said 'No', but, eventually, Brian persuaded them to do that, and they saw the rushes, and that was how I got the part. So, it was lovely, like work-out-of-work. I was very lucky to have done that.

— Caroline Munro

Munro is an Advisor to the Ray and Diana Harryhausen Foundation, having previously served on the Board of Trustees.

Other appearances during this time included I Don't Want to Be Born (1975) with Joan Collins, and At the Earth's Core (1976) with Peter Cushing and Doug McClure. She appeared also as Tammy, a nursing employee of a sinister health farm, in "The Angels of Death", an episode of the TV series The New Avengers.

=== Late 1970s and 1980s ===
In 1977, Munro turned down the opportunity to play supervillainess Ursa in Superman in favour of Bond girl Naomi, a minion of the primary villain in The Spy Who Loved Me.

Munro continued to work in numerous British and European horror and science fiction films throughout the 1970s and 1980s, such as Starcrash (1978) with David Hasselhoff, Christopher Plummer and Marjoe Gortner.

Between 1975 and 1977, at least four singles were released with her husband Judd Hamilton, including "You Got It" which had a run of popularity on the radio. They were the first act to have a UK release on the new Aquarius label. Some singles were billed as made by Judd and Miss Munro.

Munro's career continued to thrive well in the 1980s, and she appeared in many slasher and Eurotrash productions. Her first film shot on American soil was the William Lustig production Maniac (1980). This was soon followed by the "multi-award winning, shot during the Cannes Film Festival" shocker The Last Horror Film (1982) (directed by David Winters), in which she was reunited with her Maniac (and Starcrash) co-star Joe Spinell. She had a cameo role in the film Don't Open Till Christmas (1984), Slaughter High (1986), Paul Naschy's Howl of the Devil, and Jess Franco's Faceless (1988), followed in rapid succession. She reteamed with Starcrash director Luigi Cozzi for Demons 6: De Profundis (aka Il gatto nero, 1989).

Between 1984 and 1987, Munro was a hostess on the Yorkshire Television game show 3-2-1. Munro was a popular pin-up girl during this time, although she refused to pose nude. In the early 1980s, she appeared in music videos for Adam Ant's "Goody Two Shoes" (1982) and Meat Loaf's "If You Really Want To" (1983).

=== Since 1990 ===
Munro's film roles were confined to performing cameos as herself in Night Owl (1993), as Mrs. Pignon in To Die For (1994), as the counselor in her friend Jeffrey Arsenault's film Domestic Strangers (1996), and as Carla the Gypsy in Flesh for the Beast (2003).

In 2018, Munro re-teamed with her Dracula A.D. 1972 co-star Christopher Neame to appear in the horror film House of the Gorgon (2018).

In September 2021, Munro started presenting a Talking Pictures TV series, The Cellar Club. In the series, Munro introduces celebrated and obscure horror films and gives a personal, insider perspective. She has described appearing opposite Christopher Lee "in full Count attire" as a "lightbulb moment" cementing her relationship as an actor with the genre. In 2023, Munro appeared in Leigh Tarrant's British horror film The Presence of Snowgood.

== Music ==
An early effort of Munro's was a single release by Columbia, "Tar and Cement", backed with "The Sporting Life". The musicians who played on the recording included Eric Clapton, Jack Bruce, and Ginger Baker. She also recorded several singles including:

- "You Got It", backed with "Where Does Love Begin"
- "Rhythm of the Rain", backed with "Sound of the Rain"
- "Love Songs", backed with "Sound of the Sun"

In 1984, Munro collaborated with Gary Numan for the single "Pump Me Up", which was released on Numan's Numa record label.

== Filmography ==
=== Film ===
Year	Title	Role	Notes
1966	Smoke Over London	Beautiful Brunette	Cameo
1967	Casino Royale	Guard Girl	Uncredited
1968	Joanna	Extra	Uncredited
1969	Where's Jack?	Madame Vendonne	
1969	A Talent for Loving	Evalina Patten	
1971	On the Buses	Poster Girl	Uncredited
1971	The Abominable Dr. Phibes	Victoria Regina Phibes	Uncredited
1972	Mutiny on the Buses	Poster Girl	Uncredited
1972	Dracula A.D. 1972	Laura	
1972	Dr. Phibes Rises Again	Victoria Regina Phibes	
1973	The Golden Voyage of Sinbad	Margiana	
1974	Captain Kronos – Vampire Hunter	Carla	
1975	I Don't Want to Be Born	Mandy Gregory	
1976	At the Earth's Core	Dia	
1977	The Spy Who Loved Me	Naomi	
1978	Starcrash	Stella Star	
1980	Maniac	Anna D'Antoni	
1982	The Last Horror Film	Jana Bates	
1984	Don't Open Till Christmas	Caroline Munro	
1986	Slaughter High	Carol Manning	
1987	Faceless	Barbara Hallen	
1988	Howl of the Devil	Carmen	
1989	The Black Cat	Nora	
1993	Night Owl	Caroline Munro	
1994	To Die For	Mrs. Pignon	
1996	Domestic Strangers	Counsellor	
2002	Blood Craving	Caroline Munro	
2003	Flesh for the Beast	Carla the Gypsy	
2006	The Absence of Light	Abbey Church	
2011	Ray Harryhausen: Special Effects Titan	Herself	Documentary film
2012	Aqua Tales	Marina	Voice
2012	Eldorado	Lilly	
2015	Vampyres	Hotel owner	
2015	Crying Wolf 3D	Shopkeeper	
2016	Stellar Quasar and the Scrolls of Dadelia	Amanay	
2017	Cute Little Buggers	Mystic Mary	
2019	House of the Gorgon	Baroness Bartov	
2020	The Haunting of Margam Castle	Brenda	
2021	Boris Karloff: The Man Behind the Monster	Herself	Documentary film
2023	The Pocket Film of Superstitions	High Priestess	
2023	The Presence of Snowgood	Dolores Blackman	
2024	The Life and Deaths of Christopher Lee	Herself	Documentary film

=== Television ===
Year	Title	Role	Notes
1971	The BOO Show	Pet dog	TV film
1976	The Howerd Confessions	Captain Latour	Episode: #1.2
1977	The New Avengers	Tammy	Episode: "Angels of Death"
1984–1987	3-2-1	Herself	Hostess
1986	Cinderella: The Shoe Must Go On	Game Show Hostess	TV film
1988	Maigret	Carolyn Page	TV film
1992	Tropical Heat	Alicia	Episode: "Stranger in Paradise"
2013	Midsomer Murders	Evil Priestess	Episode: "Death and the Divas"

=== Short film ===
Year	Title	Role	Notes
1966	G.G. Passion	Female fan	Uncredited
2009	Turpin	Lady Victoria	
2013	The Landlady	The Landlady	
2017	Frankula	Clarissa Cobra	
2018	End User	Barmaid	
2019	Alone on Christmas: The Creation of Curtis Stein	Helga	

== Discography ==
Singles
Act	Title	Cat	Year	Loc	Notes #
Caroline Munro	"Tar and Cement" / "This Sporting Life"	Columbia DB 8189	1967	UK	
Hamilton & Munro	"Come Softly To Me" / "Sad Old Song"	King Kong Records 52001	1979	France	
Judd And Miss Munro	"You Got It" / "Where Does Love Begin"	Aquarius AQ 3	1976	UK	
Judd And Miss Munro	"Rhythm of the Rain" / "Sound of the Sun"	RCA Victor RCA 2753	1976	UK	
Judd Hamilton And Caroline Munro	"Love Songs" / "Sound of the Sun"	RCA Victor PB 5021	1977	UK	
Caroline Munro	"Pump Me Up" / "The Picture"	Numa NU 5	1984	UK	
Caroline Munro	"Pump Me Up" / "The Picture", Pump Me Up (7" Version)	Numa NUM 5	1984	UK	12"
Caroline Munro	"Pump Me Up" (Remix) / "Pump Me Up" (Instrumental Version)	Zig Zag Records – ZIG20006; Numa – ZIG20006	1985	Italy	12", 33RPM
