= The Golden Voyage of Sinbad =

1973 fantasy adventure film by Gordon Hessler

- Theatrical release poster by Brian Bysouth
- Directed by: Gordon Hessler
- Written by: Brian Clemens
- Story by: Brian Clemens; Ray Harryhausen
- Based on: Sinbad the Sailor from One Thousand and One Nights
- Produced by: Charles H. Schneer; Ray Harryhausen
- Starring: John Phillip Law; Caroline Munro; Tom Baker
- Cinematography: Ted Moore
- Edited by: Roy Watts
- Music by: Miklós Rózsa
- Production company: Morningside Productions
- Distributed by: Columbia Pictures
- Release dates: 20 December 1973 (London); 25 January 1974 (UK); 8 March 1974 (U.S.)
- Running time: 105 minutes
- Countries: United States; United Kingdom
- Language: English
- Budget: $982,351
- Box office: $11 million (United States/Canada); 37.5 million tickets (overseas)

The Golden Voyage of Sinbad is a 1973 fantasy adventure film directed by Gordon Hessler, featuring stop-motion effects by Ray Harryhausen. The film stars John Phillip Law, Tom Baker, Takis Emmanuel, and Caroline Munro. Based on the Arabian Nights tales of Sinbad the Sailor, it is the second of three Sinbad films released by Columbia Pictures, following The 7th Voyage of Sinbad (1958) and preceding Sinbad and the Eye of the Tiger (1977).

The film follows the story of Captain Sinbad (Law) as he embarks on a dangerous quest to find the Fountain of Destiny after discovering a magical golden amulet. Joined by a vizier and a slave girl (Munro), he must battle the evil sorcerer Koura (Baker) and mythical creatures to unlock the amulet's powers before Koura can use them for evil.

The Golden Voyage of Sinbad premiered on 25 December 1973 and received generally positive reviews from critics, who praised its stop-motion effects and fantastical adventure elements; however, some critics noted flaws in the storyline and character development. Commercially, the film emerged as a box-office success, grossing over $11 million worldwide against a budget of approximately $982,351. Moreover, it won the first Saturn Award for Best Fantasy Film.

== Plot ==
A mysterious flying creature soars over a ship at sea, clutching a shiny object. A crewman shoots an arrow at it, which causes the creature to drop the object, a golden amulet. The crew wants to throw the object overboard, but when Sinbad, the captain, examines it, he sees a vision of a mysterious woman with an eye tattooed on the palm of her right hand. He fastens the amulet around his neck. That night, he dreams of a man dressed in black, repeatedly calling his name, along with the woman.

A sudden storm drives Sinbad's ship near a coastal town in the country of Marabia. The man from Sinbad's dream appears as a mirage on the shore. Sinbad swims ashore. The man, an evil magician named Koura, demands the amulet, claiming it is his. Sinbad narrowly escapes into the city and meets the Grand Vizier of Marabia, who has been ruling as regent since the sultan's death, as there was no heir. The Vizier, who wears a golden mask to hide his disfigured face, explains that Sinbad's amulet is one piece of a larger puzzle; the Vizier possesses another. He tells Sinbad of a legend: the three pieces are the key to finding the fabled Fountain of Destiny on the lost continent of Lemuria. Whoever brings the pieces to the Fountain will gain "youth, a shield of darkness, and a crown of untold riches." Sinbad realizes that the two pieces fit together to form a nautical chart.

Sinbad joins the Vizier on his quest to find the Fountain. Koura, who also desires the Fountain's gifts, caused the Vizier's disfigurement. The creature that dropped the amulet was Koura's minion, a magical homunculus, which spies on Sinbad and the Vizier. When they catch it, the creature destroys itself.

Soon after, Sinbad meets the woman from his dream, a slave girl named Margiana. Seeing Sinbad's interest in the girl, her master offers Sinbad 400 coins and Margiana in exchange for taking his lazy son Haroun on the journey to make a man out of him. Sinbad reluctantly agrees. Meanwhile, Koura hires a ship and crew to follow Sinbad, using his magic to try to stop him. However, each spell drains part of Koura's life force, causing him to age visibly with each attempt.

On their journey, Sinbad and his crew face numerous challenges, including the wooden siren figurehead of their ship, which Koura animates with magic to steal the map, allowing him to locate Lemuria. Koura sends another homunculus to spy on Sinbad, overhearing the Oracle of All Knowledge describe the perils Sinbad will face. Koura seals Sinbad and his men inside the Oracle's cave, but they escape using a makeshift rope. Haroun destroys the homunculus as it attacks Sinbad.

Captured by hostile natives, Koura animates a six-armed statue of Kali, which cows the natives. Sinbad and his men arrive shortly after and battle the statue. Haroun pushes the statue from behind, causing it to fall and break. They find the final piece of the puzzle among Kali's remains. The natives capture Sinbad and his crew, but upon seeing the eye tattoo on Margiana's hand, they decide to sacrifice her to a one-eyed centaur, their God of the Single Eye and the Fountain's Guardian of Evil.

Koura reaches the Fountain of Destiny and drops one piece of the amulet into the water, restoring his life force. He summons the centaur, which battles the Guardian of Good, a griffin. Sinbad and his crew arrive as the centaur, with Koura's help, kills the griffin. After Sinbad slays the centaur, Koura drops the second piece into the Fountain, which turns him invisible (the "shield of darkness"). Koura engages Sinbad in a sword fight, but when he steps into the Fountain, he becomes visible in silhouette, enabling Sinbad to fatally stab him. When Sinbad drops the third piece into the Fountain, a crown rises from the depths. Sinbad presents it to the Vizier, whose mask dissolves as he puts it on, revealing his restored face. When Margiana asks why Sinbad did not take the crown for himself, he replies that he values his freedom more.

== Cast ==
- John Phillip Law as Sinbad
- Caroline Munro as Margiana
- Tom Baker as Prince Koura
- Douglas Wilmer as The Grand Vizier of Marabia
- Martin Shaw as Rachid
- Grégoire Aslan as Hakim
- Kurt Christian as Haroun
- Takis Emmanuel as Achmed
- David Garfield as Abdul (as John D. Garfield)
- Ferdinando Poggi as Sailor
- Aldo Sambrell as Omar
- Robert Shaw as The Oracle of All Knowledge (uncredited)

== Production ==
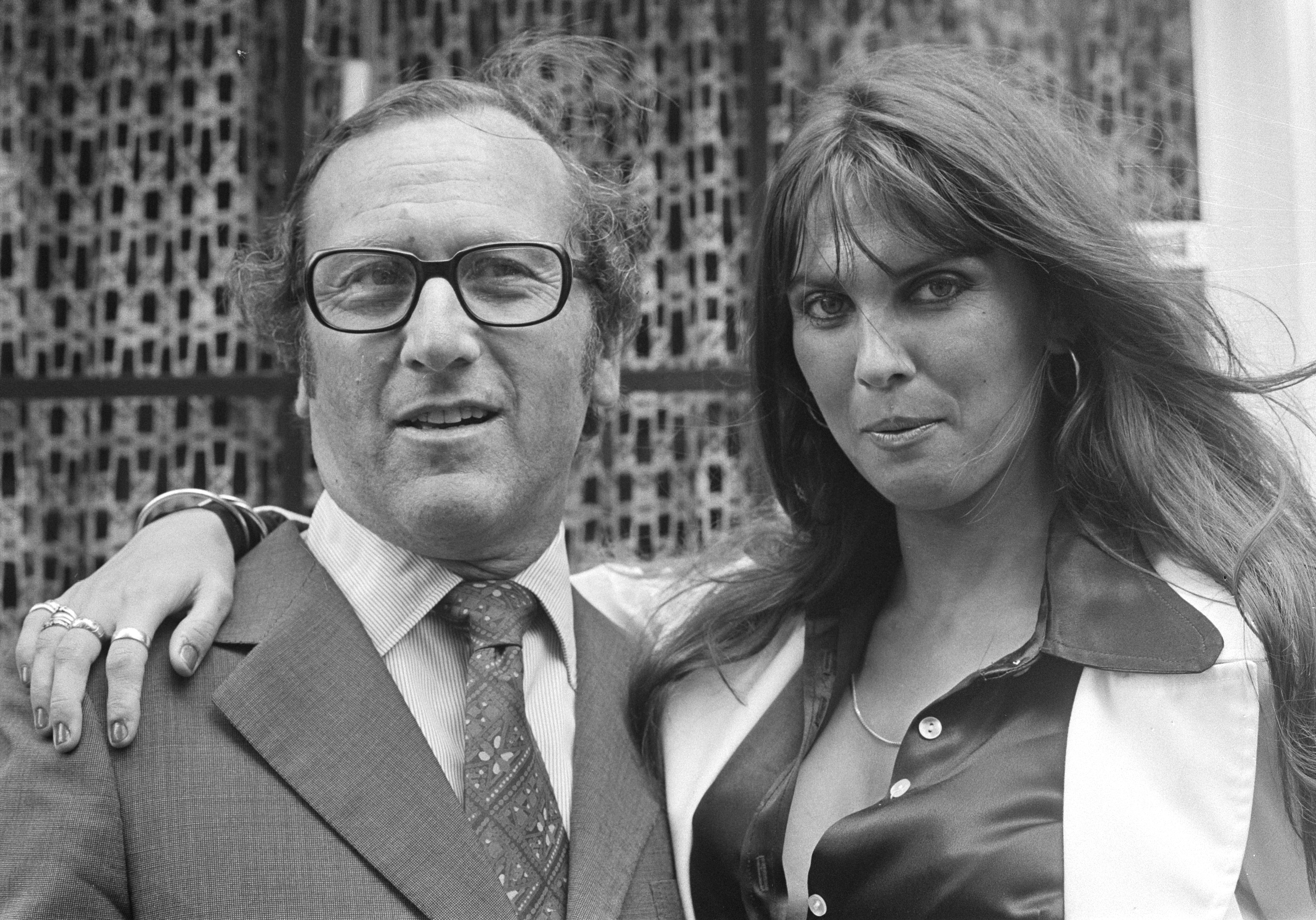
Producer Charles H. Schneer and actress Caroline Munro in Netherlands for the 1974 premiere of the film in Amsterdam.

Producer Charles H. Schneer explained that he and Ray Harryhausen decided to make another Sinbad movie because they had experienced great success with the Sinbad the Sailor character in 1958 and "felt it was time to return to the Arabian Nights," as no one else was exploring this material.

Schneer noted that other producers likely avoided the fantasy genre because they did not know how to make it economically viable, and he believed there was a new audience ready for such a film.

To reflect Harryhausen's increased involvement in the writing, editing, and casting process, he was given a co-producer credit.

=== Script ===
Harryhausen created a dozen master sketches that Schneer described as "intriguing, interesting, and characteristic of the period."

These sketches served as the basis for Brian Clemens' screenplay. Clemens was known then for his horror scripts, like See No Evil and Dr. Jekyll and Sister Hyde in 1971.

Among the sketches, a charcoal/pencil illustration depicted a fight between a one-eyed centaur and a giant single-horned Neanderthal-like creature. This 8-foot-tall (2.4 m) caveman—replaced by a griffin in the final version of the film—will appear in 1977 in Sinbad and the Eye of the Tiger, the third and final Sinbad film released by Columbia Pictures.

=== Casting ===
John Phillip Law, who "wasn't very athletic" mentioned Schneer, was cast in the lead role at Columbia's suggestion. Known for his breakthrough role as a sailor in The Russians Are Coming, the Russians Are Coming (1966), Law had since played a blind angel in Barbarella (1968), the master thief Diabolik in Danger: Diabolik (1968) and fighter pilot Manfred von Richthofen in Von Richthofen and Brown (1971).

Schneer noted that Law "didn't handle a sword as well" as Kerwin Mathews in The 7th Voyage of Sinbad, but noticed he did his best in the role, fighting giant and tiny creatures still to be animated. Law's use of a Middle Eastern accent was a dissatisfaction for Schneer.

Caroline Munro was cast in the female lead role on a proposition of Clemens, who had her play a Romani girl in Captain Kronos – Vampire Hunter, a 1974 Hammer film he had written and directed. Like Law, Munro had played in horror, science fiction and action films—Dracula A.D. 1972 and Dr. Phibes Rises Again for the year 1972.

Schneer's goal in casting Munro as the slave girl Margiana was more practical: "We wanted her to project that sex appeal, because that was what was happening at the time in the film business. But we were still making a G-rated picture, so we went for G-rated sex appeal."

Tom Baker was cast for the role of the antagonist, the wizard Koura. He had played Grigori Rasputin in Nicholas and Alexandra (1971) and had supporting roles in genre films such as The Canterbury Tales (1972) and The Vault of Horror (1973).

=== Principal photography ===
Schneer and Harryhausen based their production in Spain, in Madrid and on the island of Mallorca, to take advantage of the region's rugged scenery.

They considered filming scenes at the Alhambra palace in Granada, but due to high rental fees they filmed instead at the Royal Palace of La Almudaina in Palma de Mallorca.

Additional scenes were shot in the Caves of Artà—used as the temple of the Oracle—and at the Torrent of Pareis, in the Serra de Tramuntana.

The film was shot between June and August 1972.

=== Special effects ===
Harryhausen spent months animating alone the numerous legendary creatures Sinbad the Sailor encounters : homunculus, animated statues, a one-eyed centaur and a griffin.

He did it in stop motion—24 frames a second—, with puppets his father helped him design, and used rear projection, lighting design and perspective techniques to edit the live action footage.

Harryhausen acknowledged that, due to aniconism in Islam, Sinbad's dhow shouldn't have a figurehead. But he was pleased with the scene of this wooden siren statue attacking the crew, controlled by the evil wizard.

To prepare for the shooting of the live-action fight with a stone statue of Kali, the actors rehearsed with three stuntmen strapped together with a belt, a saber in each hand. Harryhausen then reproduced Kali's fight choreography in his studio, moving a total of 144 arms for each second of the sequence.

== Reception ==
=== Critical reception ===
The Golden Voyage of Sinbad received generally favorable reviews from critics. On Rotten Tomatoes, it holds a rating of 75% based on 16 reviews, with an average rating of 5.6/10.

=== Box office ===
In the United States and Canada, The Golden Voyage of Sinbad emerged as a commercial success at the box-office, earning a total revenue of $11,000,000, including $5,000,000 in rentals, bringing its total gross to $16,000,000—the equivalent of $78,227,342 in 2016 dollars. The film was produced on a modest budget of $982,351, a small sum even for a film in the early 1970s.

Overseas, it sold 37 million tickets in the Soviet Union and 527,437 tickets in France, for a combined total of at least 37,527,437 tickets sold internationally.

However, Columbia Pictures did not fully benefit from the film's success, as they had sold off all their interest in its 1974 slate to Bright-Persky Associates.

== Comic book adaptation ==
Marvel Comics published a two-issue adaptation of The Golden Voyage of Sinbad in Worlds Unknown #7–8 (June & August 1974). Titled The Golden Voyage of Sinbad: Land of the Lost, it was scripted by Len Wein, penciled by George Tuska, and inked by Vince Colletta.

== Home media ==
The Golden Voyage of Sinbad was released in the United Kingdom on VHS in 1991.

It has been released in Blu-ray, in a limited edition of 3000 and in the series The Fantastic Films of Ray Harryhausen (along with The 7th Voyage of Sinbad, Jason and the Argonauts and Sinbad and the Eye of the Tiger).

== Bibliography ==
- Scapperotti, Dan R; Bartholomew, David (1974). "The Golden Voyage of Sinbad". Cinefantastique. Vol. 3, no. 2. pp. 4–5, 42–45 – via Internet Archive.
