= Gabriella Ezra =

Italian language coach (1928–2019)

- Born: Gabriella Elisa Schittar; 16 January 1928; Venice, Italy
- Died: 27 July 2019 (aged 91)
- Occupation: Language coach

Gabriella Elisa Ezra OSI (née Schittar; 16 January 1928 – 27 July 2019) was an Italian language coach for Glyndebourne Festival Opera. Born in Venice, Italy, she is an Officer of the Order of the Star of Italy.

On 28 April 1945, Gabriella Schittar, then aged just 17, risked her life to negotiate with a German firing squad who were about to execute 38 men and boys (including her father Luigi Schittar) in the village of Cappella di Scorzè where she had been evacuated from Venice. The soldiers claimed that the villagers were responsible for an attack on their convoy. Gabriella, who had studied in Innsbruck, Austria and spoke German, managed to convince the soldiers that the men and boys were innocent, and in doing so she saved them from certain death. Her willingness to put her life at risk for the sake of justice and brotherhood was a demonstration of extraordinary bravery.

In 1946, while working as a translator in the British Town Major's office in Mestre, Gabriella fell in love with Captain Peter Ezra, of the British Army Middlesex Regiment, who took part in the Sicily Campaign and the Battle of Anzio during World War II. After their wedding in Venice in 1949, they moved to Hove, from where she worked as a language coach at Glyndebourne Festival Opera, and had two children: Mark Ezra and Diana. Captain Peter Ezra died in 2005.

On 20 November 2017 the President of the Italian Republic, Sergio Mattarella, awarded Gabriella Elisa Schittar with the honour Officer of the Order of the Star of Italy for her courage and altruism.

Ezra died on 27 July 2019, at the age of 91.

== Honours ==
- Officer of the Order of the Star of Italy (2017)
