= Luke Pope =

English nurseryman and florist

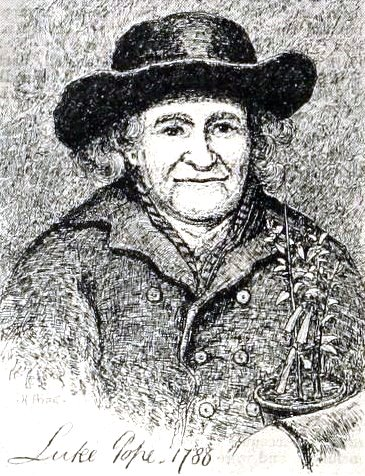
- Luke Pope, 1788, with a specimen of Correa speciosa
- Born: 1740; Smethwick, Staffordshire, England
- Died: 1825 (aged 84–85)
- Occupations: Nurseryman and florist
- Known for: Founded John Pope & Sons

Luke Pope (1740–1825) was an English nurseryman and florist (Note: Which at this time included growers as well as sellers of flowers) in the English West Midlands, who founded the firm that became John Pope & Sons. He was associated with the Manor of Smethwick, from whom he rented land and for whom he carried out the duties of constable and bailiff, and had nurseries there and in nearby Handsworth. He specialised in tulips, claiming on his deathbed to have spent more than £3,000 (equivalent to £231,986 in 2023) on them, and later in the shrubs and plants of North America for which his son John's travels in the United States were a source. His grandson, Luke Linnaeus Pope, prepared illustrations of plants from his father's stock as they would appear when they were in bloom.

== Early life and family ==
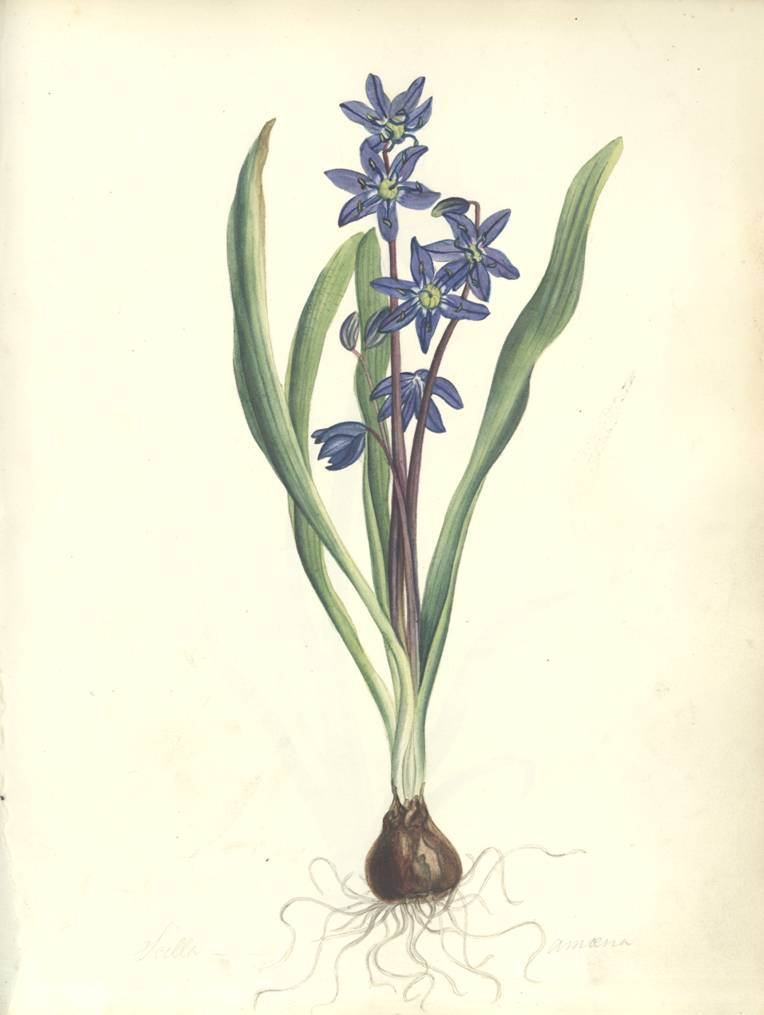
A drawing by Luke Pope's grandson, Luke Linnaeus, c.1825.

Luke Pope was born in the hamlet of Smethwick, Staffordshire, in 1740. One of his sons was Henry Pope, known as Harry Pope, who had his nursery in King's Norton near Birmingham. Henry died in 1891 leaving an estate of £3,014. Another son was John Pope (1772-1850) who was the father of Luke Linnaeus Pope (fl. 1820s), a botanical artist who was partly named after the Swedish botanist Carl Linnaeus. Another grandson was Alexander Pope who ran the family's Handsworth nursery.

== Career ==
Pope was variously described as a gardener, a seedsman, and a nurseryman. He specialised in tulips and later in the shrubs and plants of North America. In 1788, he was pictured holding a specimen of Correa speciosa, a plant native to Australia.

In 1771, he leased around one acre of common or waste land from the local Lord of the Manor, situated in Ruck of Stones Lane (now Lewisham Road), Smethwick. The lease was of 99 years with the condition that the area be kept fenced and that Pope build a house on the site worth at least £30. In 1781, he bought the freehold. In 1799, the roll of the Manor of Smethwick records his acquisition of a "messuage, land and appurtenances in Smethwick" from Samuell Lewis of Halesowen. He was constable of that manor in 1796, and in 1802 bailiff. His views as a constable on the effect of tithes on the crops planted by local farmers were reported in William Pitt's survey of the agriculture of Staffordshire. In 1809 the Lord of Smethwick enfranchised a piece of copyhold land occupied by Pope for a fee of £75.

In 1790, Pope bought land at Gib Heath in Handsworth and it was the nursery he established there, continued after his death by his son John and grandson Alexander as John Pope and Sons, for which the family became well known in gardening circles.

== Death and legacy ==
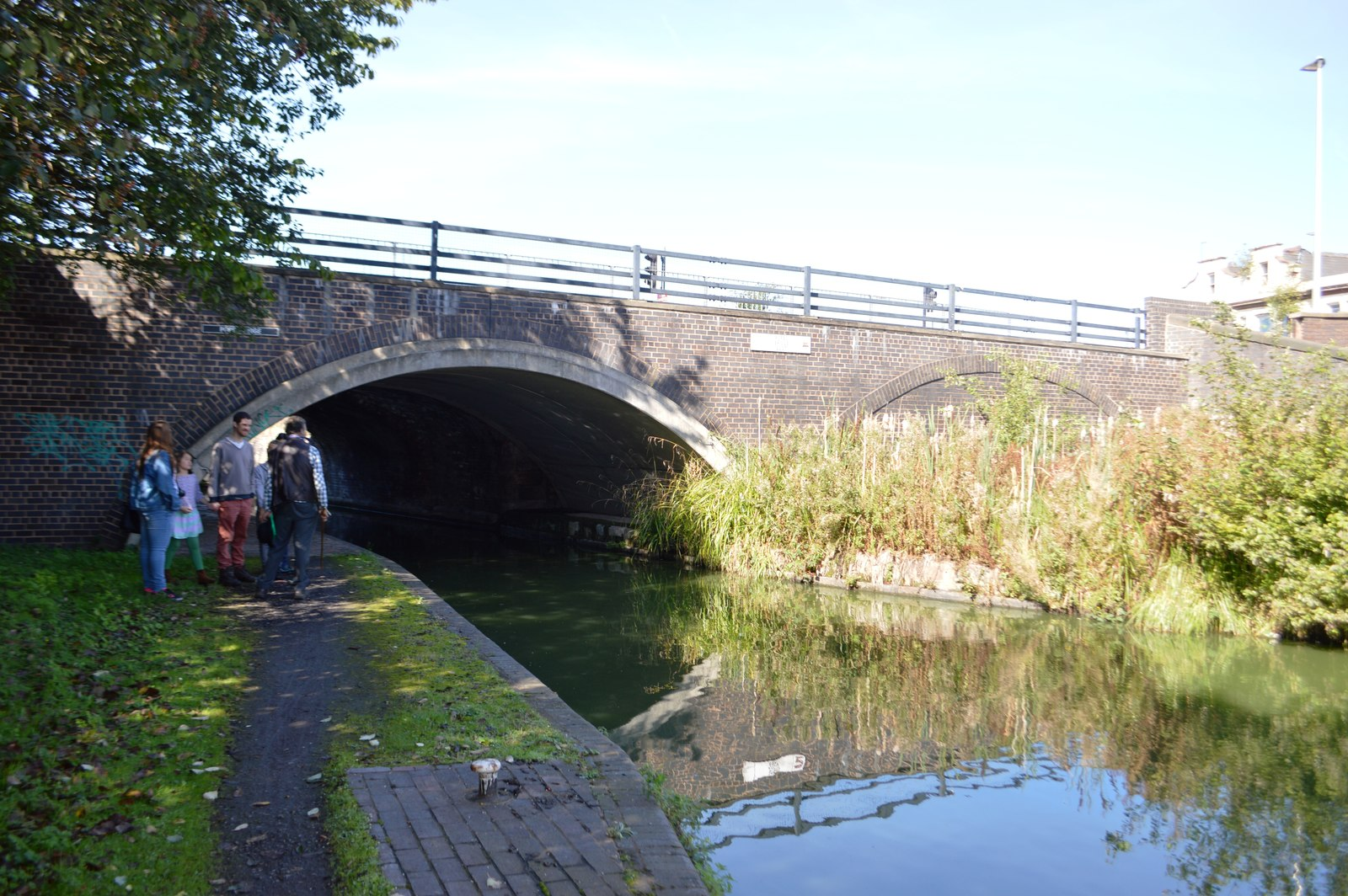
Pope's Bridge, Birmingham Old Main Line Canal, Smethwick.

Pope died in 1825. He claimed on his deathbed to have spent over £3,000 (equivalent to £231,986 in 2023) on tulips, the stock having been transferred to Handsworth by the time of his death where customers could inspect illustrations of the plants in bloom prepared by his grandson Luke Linnaeus Pope. Four quarto volumes were known in 1831, but in 1960, Miles Hadfield was not sure if they still existed. Volume III of the illustrations, containing 88 watercolours, was acquired by Birmingham City Archives in 1998.

The firm, which also had premises in West Bromwich, specialised in laying-out grounds for planting with fruit and trees bred at Handsworth, but also grew plants in its nursery of botanical and floral interest, particularly from the United States where John Pope had travelled widely. It also supplied material of rare plants for the preparation of illustrations in the books of Benjamin Maund and Jane Loudon.

Smethwick contains a Pope Street, and Pope's Bridge which carries Bridge Street over the Birmingham Old Main Line Canal.

== See also ==
- Thomas Davey
