= Mark Ezra =

Film writer, producer, director, actor & published children's author

- Occupations: Film writer, producer, director, actor, children's author
- Years active: 1978–present

Mark Ezra is a British film writer, producer, director, actor, and published children's author. He is most noted for films such as Slaughter High, Steal, and Waking Ned.

== Early life ==
Mark is the son of Captain Peter and Italian language coach Gabriella Ezra. He was educated at Ampleforth College and went on to study film production at the University of Westminster.

== Film work ==
Ezra's horror movie, Slaughter High (1986) (originally April Fool's Day), was picked up by Vestron at the Cannes Film Festival for ten times its production costs. He has directed several films, including Savage Hearts (1995), which featured Richard Harris, Julian Fellowes, and Jerry Hall.

Waking Ned (1998), which he co-produced, was picked up by Fox Searchlight and grossed over $100 million.

He wrote the screenplay for Steal (2002), which opened in the number 1 spot in France during the Cannes Film Festival.

His film House Swap (2010) won at the Los Angeles Cinema Festival of Hollywood in the United States.

== Filmography ==
Film
| Year | Title | Role |
|---|---|---|
| 1978 | The Odd Job | Unit Publicity |
| 1986 | Slaughter High | Screenplay |
| 1989 | Blind Justice | Screenplay |
| 1990 | Living Doll | Screenplay |
| 1995 | Savage Hearts | Director/Script |
| 1998 | Waking Ned | Co-associate Producer |
| 2002 | Steal | Written by |
| 2010 | House Swap | Director/Writer |

Television
| Year | Title | Role |
|---|---|---|
| 2000 | King of the Woods | Director |
| 2000 | Deadly Assassin | Director |
| 2000 | Spellbound | Director |
| 2000 | Gamesmaster | Director |

Actor
| Year | Title | Role |
|---|---|---|
| 1977 | The Grand Inquisitor | acolyte |
| 1980 | Q9[17/06/80] | cast member |
| 1982 | Oil | cast member |

== Writing ==
The Nth Doctor by Jean-Marc Lofficier includes a chapter on Ezra's Doctor Who script The Return of Varnax.

Author
| Year | Title | Illustrated by |
|---|---|---|
| 1994 | Bertie's Uncle Basil | S.Lewis |
| 1994 | The Bumbles | Mike Dodd |
| 1996 | The Prickly Hedgehog | Gavin Rowe |
| 1996 | The Hungry Otter | Gavin Rowe |
| 1997 | The Sleepy Dormouse | Gavin Rowe |
| 1998 | The Frightened Little Owl | Gavin Rowe |
