= I Don't Want to Be Born =

1975 British film by Peter Sasdy

- British theatrical release poster
- Directed by: Peter Sasdy
- Written by: Stanley Price
- Produced by: Nato de Angeles
- Starring: Joan Collins; Eileen Atkins; Ralph Bates; Donald Pleasence; Caroline Munro; Hilary Mason; John Steiner
- Cinematography: Kenneth Talbot
- Edited by: Keith Palmer
- Music by: Ron Grainer
- Production companies: The Rank Organisation; Unicapital
- Distributed by: Fox-Rank
- Release date: 29 May 1975
- Running time: 95 minutes
- Country: United Kingdom
- Language: English

I Don't Want to Be Born (U.S. titles: The Devil Within Her, The Monster and Sharon's Baby) is a 1975 British supernatural horror film directed by Peter Sasdy and starring Joan Collins, Ralph Bates, Eileen Atkins, Donald Pleasence, Hilary Mason, and Caroline Munro. It was written by Stanley Price. Its plot follows a woman who, after being cursed, gives birth to an infant son who appears to be demonically possessed.

== Plot ==
Lucy works as a go-go dancer at a London club, where her stage act includes a routine with a dwarf named Hercules. One night after the show, she invites Hercules into her dressing room for a drink, where Hercules begins touching her. Lucy feels uncomfortable but tries to pretend nothing is happening, until Hercules makes a sudden lunge for her breasts. Stage manager Tommy rushes into the room and sends Hercules on his way, then proceeds to make love to Lucy. Later as Lucy leaves the club she is confronted by the spurned and humiliated Hercules, who curses her with the words "You will have a baby—a monster! An evil monster conceived inside your womb! As big as I am small and possessed by the devil himself!"

Months pass and Lucy has left her stripping days behind, having moved up in the world via marriage to the wealthy Italian Gino Carlesi and now comfortably settled in a grand Kensington townhouse. Lucy goes into hospital to give birth to the baby. It proves to be a protracted, dangerous and painful delivery as the baby is unusually heavy. The newborn infant is handed to Lucy, and seconds later she is sporting a slashed and bleeding cheek. She exclaims that the baby scratched her to her obstetrician Dr. Finch, who calmly explains that the baby must have been alarmed at being held too tightly.

Lucy and Gino bring the baby home and are welcomed by their efficient, no-nonsense housekeeper Mrs. Hyde. Things get off to a bad start when Mrs. Hyde goes to chuck the baby's chin, only to regret it. "The little devil bit me!" she says as she displays her crushed finger. She takes an instant dislike to the child, and is later rewarded with a dead mouse in her cup of tea. Lucy's attempts at maternal bonding are fraught with problems. She is visited by her friend Mandy and is voicing her concerns when they are interrupted by a series of crashes from upstairs. To their horror, they find the baby in his cot but the nursery practically demolished.

Gino's sister Albana, a nun, arrives from her convent in Italy to visit her new nephew. Immediately aware that all is not well, she invites Gino to pray with her for the baby, which results in agonising screams from the nursery. Dr. Finch is consulted, and agrees to carry out a series of tests. Lucy meanwhile finds the burdens of motherhood too much to bear alone, and employs Jill Fletcher, a nurse, to look after the baby. After a near-miss when the nurse's head is pulled underwater while bathing the baby, matters take a deadly turn when she takes him for a walk in the park: Reaching out from his pram, he pushes her with such force that she falls, cracks her head on a rock, and falls into a lake, drowning.

Lucy pays a visit to Tommy at the strip club, she intimates that, given the timing of the birth, there is a chance the baby could be his. "Just cause you’ve got some freaky offspring you wanna pin it on me?" he asks. However his curiosity is aroused and he asks to see the "spooky kid". Once at the house he leans over to peer into the baby's cot, only to reel back with a smashed and bloody nose. This temporarily pushes the baby up in Lucy's estimation and she gazes lovingly at him, until the face in the cot turns into that of Hercules.

One evening Gino plans a romantic night-in to take Lucy's mind off her woes. At the end of the night, he goes to check on the baby, only to find the nursery empty, the window open and odd noises coming from the garden. Going out to investigate, he looks up into a tree, whereupon a noose is thrust around his neck and he is hauled into the air and hanged, his body is then stuffed down a drain. The following day Lucy criss-crosses London in a frenzy trying to find her missing husband. Dr. Finch is summoned and pays an evening call to check on the baby and the distraught Lucy. After administering a powerful sedative to Lucy, he too hears strange noises. He steps out into the garden, and is decapitated with a spade. The trail of death continues as Lucy stumbles through the house in a groggy haze, pleading for her life to no avail as she is stabbed through the heart with a pair of scissors.

Finally galvanized into action, Albana decides that she must perform an exorcism on the baby. Brandishing a crucifix at him and incanting in Latin, she bravely persists as the room shakes and the baby tears at her vestments. Meanwhile, at the strip club Hercules is on stage, and begins to stagger around in pain. Albana finally touches the crucifix to the baby's head, and his demons are cast out at the same time as Hercules falls over dead in front of a stunned audience.

== Cast ==
- Joan Collins as Lucy Carlesi
- Ralph Bates as Gino Carlesi
- Eileen Atkins as Sister Albana
- Donald Pleasence as Dr. Finch
- Hilary Mason as Mrs. Hyde
- Caroline Munro as Mandy Gregory
- John Steiner as Tommy Morris
- George Claydon as Hercules
- Janet Key as Jill Fletcher
- Derek Benfield as Police Inspector
- Stanley Lebor as Police Sergeant
- Judy Buxton as Sheila
- Andrew Secombe as delivery boy
- Floella Benjamin as nurse

== Production ==
During its production, the film had the working title The Boy. Filming took place in late 1974 in London and at Pinewood Studios. The residence used for Collins' character's home is located at 32 Wellington Square in Chelsea. Finance came in part from the Rank Organisation.

== Release ==
I Don't Want to Be Born was distributed in the United Kingdom by Fox-Rank and premiered in London on 29 May 1975, screening as a double bill with The Ghoul.

In the United States, the film was theatrically distributed in 1976 as The Devil Within Her by American International Pictures.

=== Home media ===
The film was released on VHS in North America under its original I Don't Want to Be Born title by the Canadian-based Intra Video in 1985.

In 2011, Scorpion Releasing issued the film on DVD as part of the Katarina's Nightmare Theater line. A Blu-ray edition was released by Scorpion on 8 September 2017.

== Reception ==
The Monthly Film Bulletin wrote: "A ludicrous attempt to cash in on the exorcism cult, set in a travelogue London and reducing the monster-baby theme dignified by It's Alive to penny-dreadful histrionics."

Andrew Nickolds of Time Out described the film as "derivative and disastrous in every respect: a poor idea ... an abominable screenplay by Stanley Price ("I keep getting these awful premonitions"), ludicrous acting ... and worst of all, Sasdy's direction. Almost every foot of film not concerned with the baby is travelogue at its most banal – extraneous shots of Westminster and Oxford Street, plugs for Fortnum & Mason and Holiday Inns. Completing this sorry tale of rip-off is borrowing from The Exorcist [1973] ... and any number of details from Amicus, Hammer and Swinging London horrors. Give it a wide berth."

The Bangor Daily News found the film "sensational and vulgar" and "an unholy cross" between The Exorcist and Rosemary's Baby (1968), adding "why decent actors like Eileen Atkins and Donald Pleasence allowed themselves to be corralled into a mess like this is enigmatic."

Vincent Canby of The New York Times drew similar comparisons to The Exorcist, The Omen, and Rosemary's Baby, adding: "The Devil Within Her is foolish and probably knows it... The moral of the movie: don't mess around with amorous dwarfs. The point of the movie: the attempt to create suspense we wait for the characters to realize that the baby is possessed. Joan suspects almost immediately but she acts too late."

As The Devil Within Her, Roger Ebert named the film as his "Dog of [March, 1976]", drawing the same comparisons to The Exorcist put forth by Nickolds, while adding "the kid must have been a sound effects man in a previous incarnation because he makes noises like squad car sirens and stones banging around at empty garbage cans. He's also good at murdering everybody in the family even the family doctor, who is played by Donald Pleasence as if he wanted to be somewhere else and for that matter... so did I."

== Sources ==
- Craig, Rob (2019). American International Pictures: A Comprehensive Filmography. Jefferson, North Carolina: McFarland & Company. ISBN 978-1-476-66631-0.
- Pitts, Michael R. (1991). Horror Film Stars. Jefferson, North Carolina: McFarland & Company. ISBN 978-0-899-50507-7.
- Pykett, Derek (2014). British Horror Film Locations. Jefferson, North Carolina: McFarland & Company. ISBN 978-0-786-45193-7.
- Smith, Gary A. (2006). Uneasy Dreams: The Golden Age of British Horror Films, 1956–1976. Jefferson, North Carolina: McFarland & Company. ISBN 978-1-476-60530-2.
