= Thomas Davey (florist) =

British florist (1758–1833)

- Born: c. 1758
- Died: 25 April 1833 (aged 74–75)
- Occupations: Florist and nurseryman
- Known for: Flower grower

Thomas Davey (c. 1758 – 25 April 1833) was a British florist and nurseryman based in Camberwell, Surrey, and later in Chelsea, Middlesex, both now in London, England. The son of a nurseryman of the same name, he was known for his "florists' flowers", the type of flowers traditionally popular with English florists, and specialised in tulips, geraniums, and pinks. He capitalised on a new enthusiasm for tulips and flower-growing at the start of the 19th century in what has been described as a "cult of florists' flowers", giving exhibitions that attracted large crowds and publishing sales catalogues, one of which offered nearly 800 different types of tulip bulbs.

The botanist Robert Sweet named the pelargonium "Daveyanum" (Davey's stork's-bill) after him and the tulip "Daveyana" was given his name by its breeder M. Dupree of Gothenburg. He grew many plants to which he attached his name, such as the tulips "La Joie de Davey" and "Davey's Trafalgar" and was one of the first to seriously take up the propagation and improvement of pinks.

He was a bell-ringer and parish official and was buried at St Luke's Church in Sydney Street, Chelsea. The antiquarian Samuel Shepherd composed a poem in his memory. Wellington Square was built on the site of his house and nursery.

== Early life and family ==
Thomas Davey was born around 1758, the son of a well-known nurseryman of the same name. His first wife was Mary.

== Early career ==
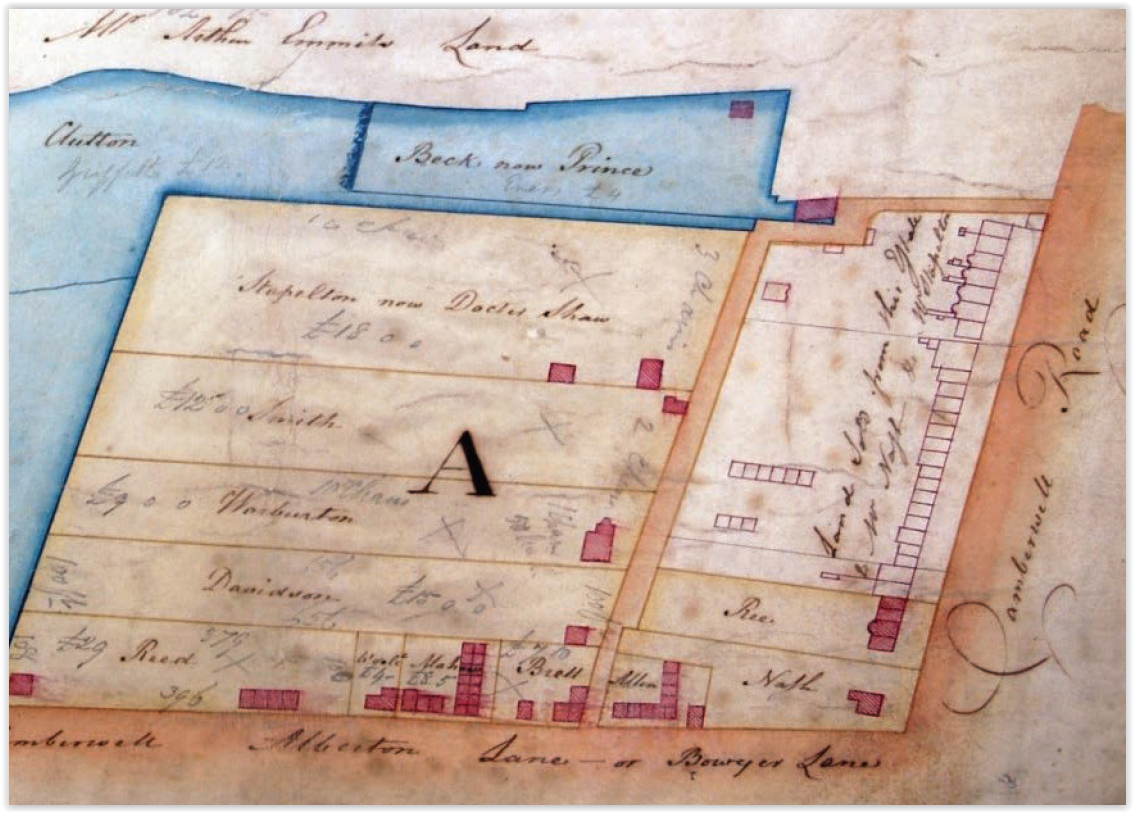
1796 plan of the corner of Wyndham Road and Camberwell Road where Davey had his first nursery on the plot marked "Ree" (lower right)

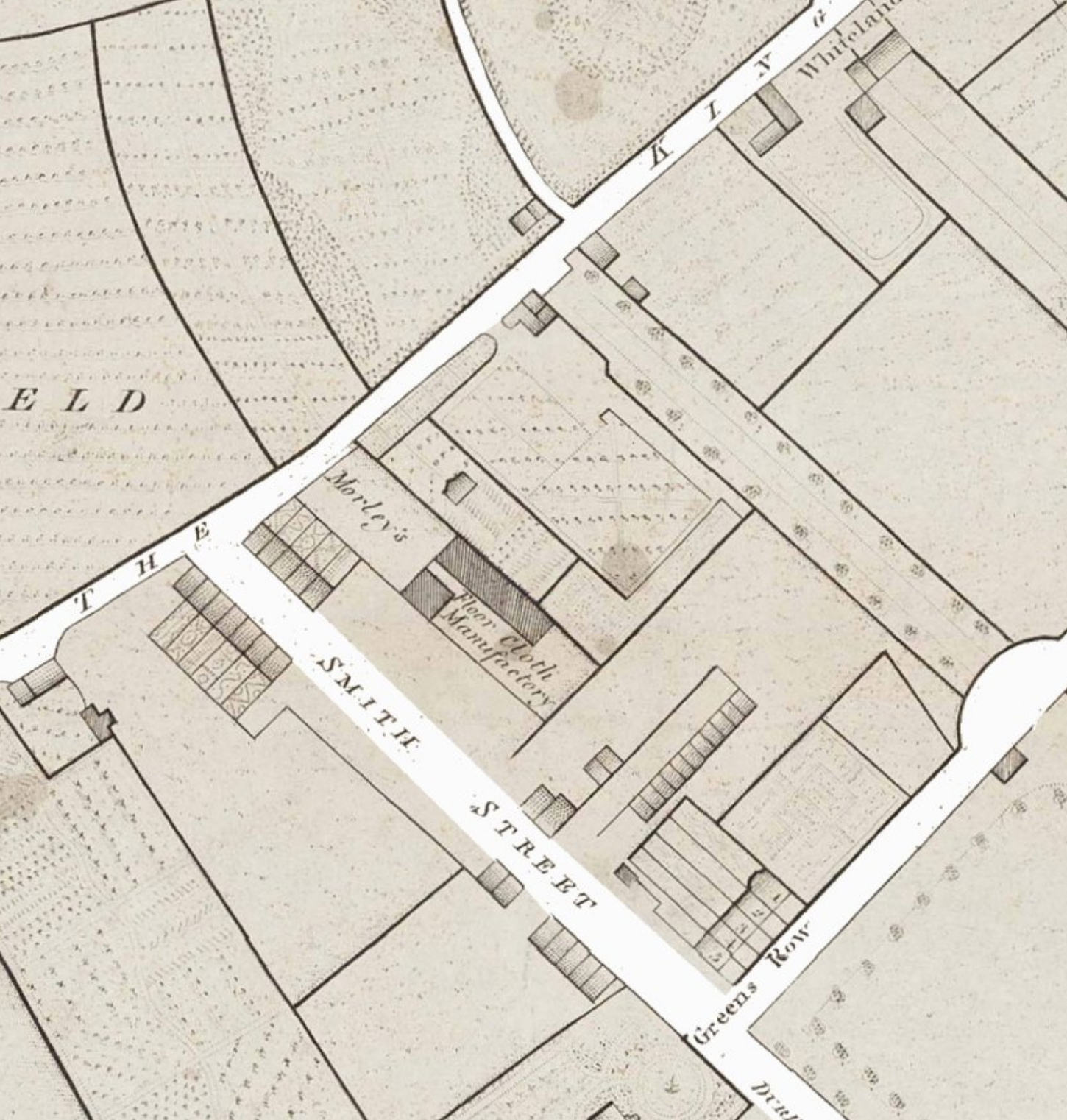
King's Road and Smith Street, Chelsea, c.1800 before the development of Wellington Square. Davey's house and nursery were on the plot marked Morley's and the area immediately to the north.

Davey had a plant nursery in Camberwell, Surrey, now in London, on land he rented from John Ree near the corner of Wyndham Road and Camberwell Road. His father may have owned the nursery before him.

His shop was noted for its window displays, which one year featured a painting of "the most beautiful tulips, as Bonaparte, Washington and the Duke of Wirtenberg". He later sold a bybloemen tulip named "Davey's Trafalgar" (now considered extinct). He gave exhibitions of tulips in May and carnations in July. The tulips were described as "supposed to be the finest in Europe".

== Chelsea ==
Around 1798, Davey moved to a site on the south side of the King's Road in Chelsea, then in Middlesex but now in London, an area known for its plant nurseries which were in the process of moving from growing the useful to growing the ornamental. He lived in a house that was afterwards the site of Thomas Morley's, and then Thomas Downing's, floor-cloth manufactory and house near the corner with Smith Street, with his nursery adjacent. He was a bell-ringer at the local church and "served most of the old parochial offices".

Davey's nursery was separated from that of his competitor James Colvill, and his son of the same name, by "Butterfly Alley", which drew its name from the many butterflies attracted to the gardens on either side.

== Florists' flowers ==
Davey specialised in "florists' flowers", the types of flowers traditionally popular with English florists such as carnations, camellias, pelargoniums, pinks and tulips and gave a popular exhibition each spring at which he showed auriculas, hyacinths, tulips and carnations. He was part of what Anna Pavord has called a "widespread cult of florists' flowers" beginning in the 19th century, but a cult that faced opposition or indifference from botanists who preferred pure types to the flowers bred by the florists which existed purely for appearance, had no role in agriculture, and did not fit into existing taxonomies.

One example was pinks, of which Davey was one of the first to seriously take up the propagation and improvement. He produced his own cultivars and grew those of amateur gardeners, particularly the "laced" varieties popular with London growers which had only been bred for the first time in the early 1770s. But one gardening writer in 1843 felt that the new varieties were not welcomed by botanists who did not appreciate their aesthetic appeal or their novelty, seeing "no beauty in a double flower" and viewing the laced varieties as "so many monsters - so many specimens of perverted nature".

There was also a class distinction between the nurserymen and their customers, for while Davey's shop was "patronised by the nobility", the nurserymen themselves were of the lower artisan class and the florists' flowers they grew somewhat looked down upon by amateur growers and professional botanists who tended to be of a higher social class.

== Tulips ==
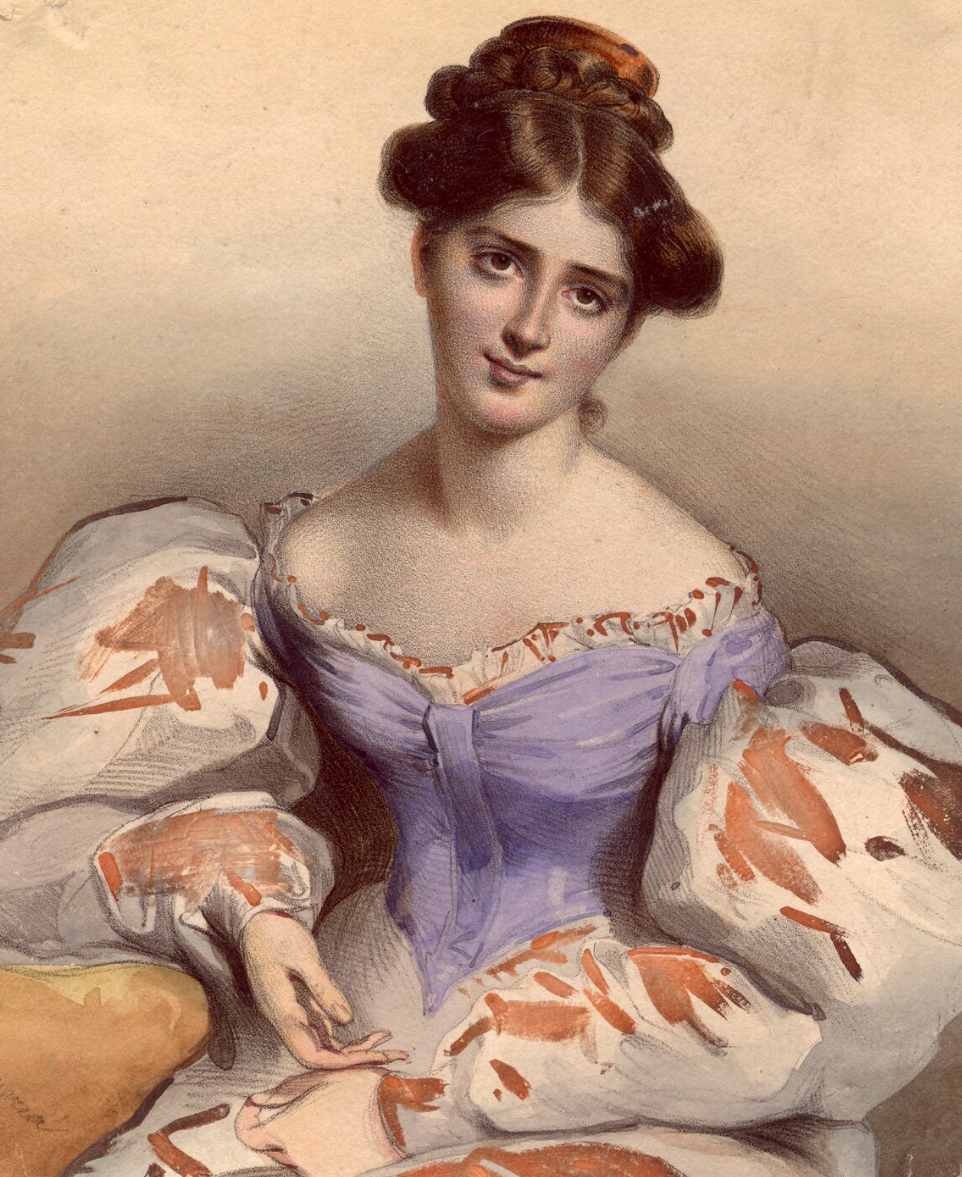
The actress Fanny Kemble after whom a tulip was named. Hand-coloured lithograph after the portrait by Thomas Lawrence, 1830s.

A "well-known tulip-fancier", along with contemporaries such as James Maddock of Walworth and Luke Pope of Handsworth, Davey capitalised on and helped to foster a renewed interest in that species. His 1798 catalogue offered almost 800 different tulip bulbs, including one named "Gloria Florum Suprema" at £300 each. He paid the executors of the late William Clark (died 1831) one hundred sovereigns for a single bulb of Clark's bybloemen tulip "Fanny Kemble", named after the popular young actress Fanny Kemble, which had created a sensation when Clark first introduced it. In 1833 it was described in Joseph Harrison's The Floricultural Cabinet and Florist's Magazine as the best tulip ever produced in England. He declined an offer of £157 10s for his only bulb of the tulip "La Joie de Davey". "Daveyana" was broken (bred) by M. Dupree of Gothenburg, who named it after Davey. It is considered extinct.

Other cultivars bearing his name included "Davey's Bacchus" (carnation), "Davey's Queen Adelaide" (yellow picotees), and the pinks "Davey's Lady Penryn", "Davey's Juliet", "Davey's Bolivar", and "Davey's Roi de Pourpre". The hybrid pelargonium "Daveyanum" (Davey's stork's-bill), which he grew from seed, was named after him by the botanist Robert Sweet who also drew extensively on plants bred at James Colvill's nursery in the King's Road in his work.

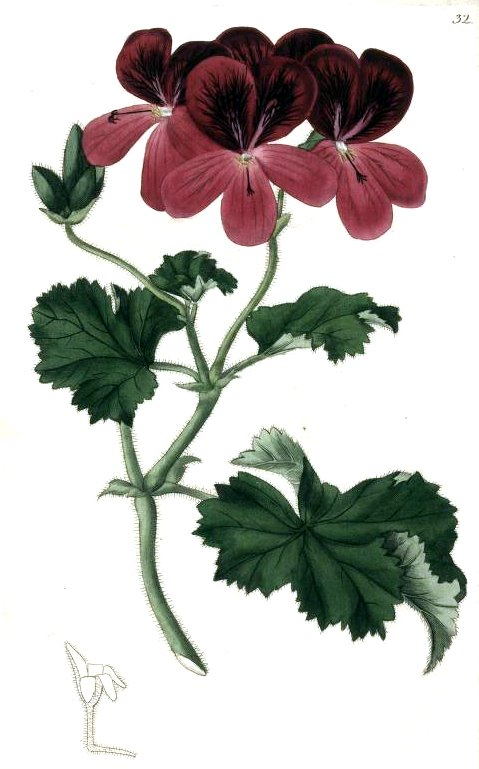
Pelargonium "Daveyanum" (Davey's stork's-bill), c.1822.

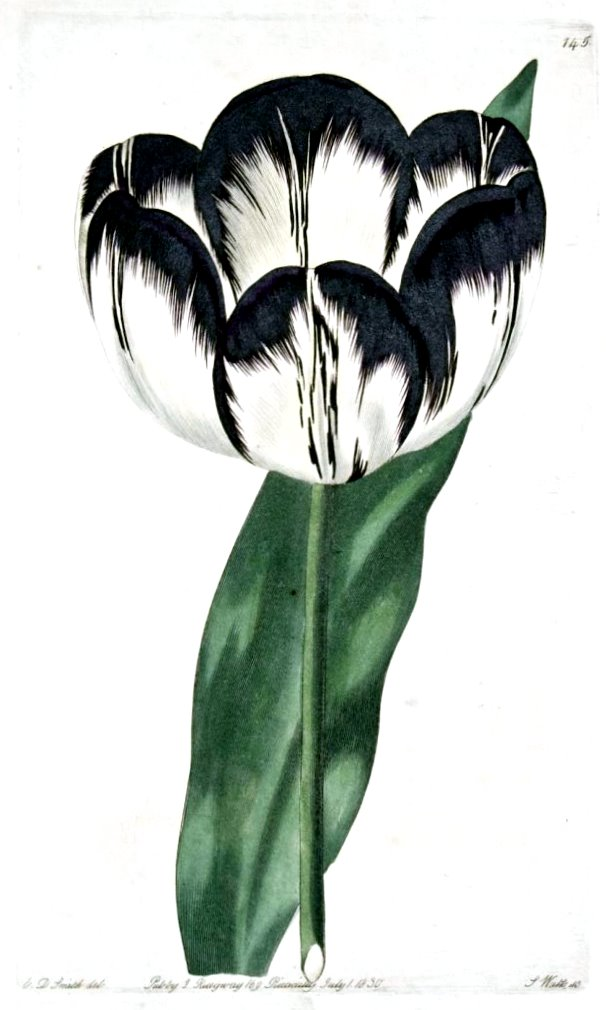
"Davey's Trafalgar" tulip, drawn by Edwin Dalton Smith, 1833.

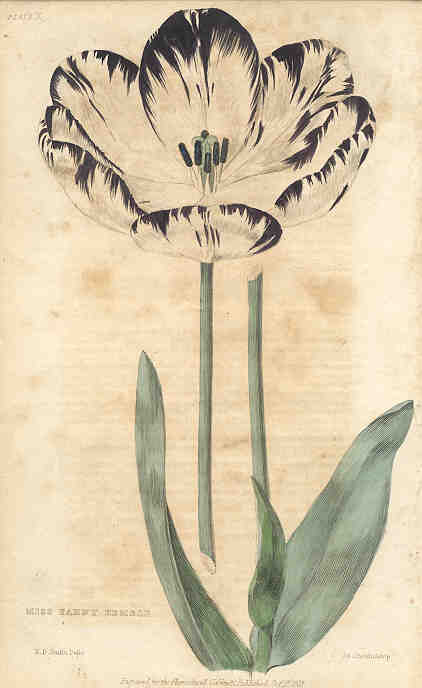
"Miss Fanny Kemble" tulip, Edwin Dalton Smith, 1833.

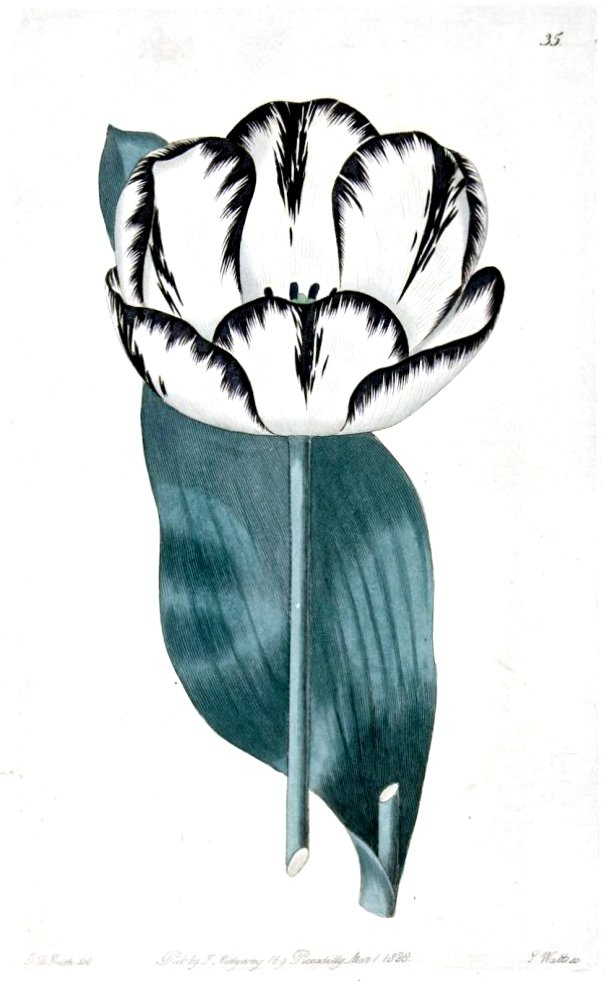
"Daveyana" tulip, Edwin Dalton Smith, 1833.

== Death and legacy ==
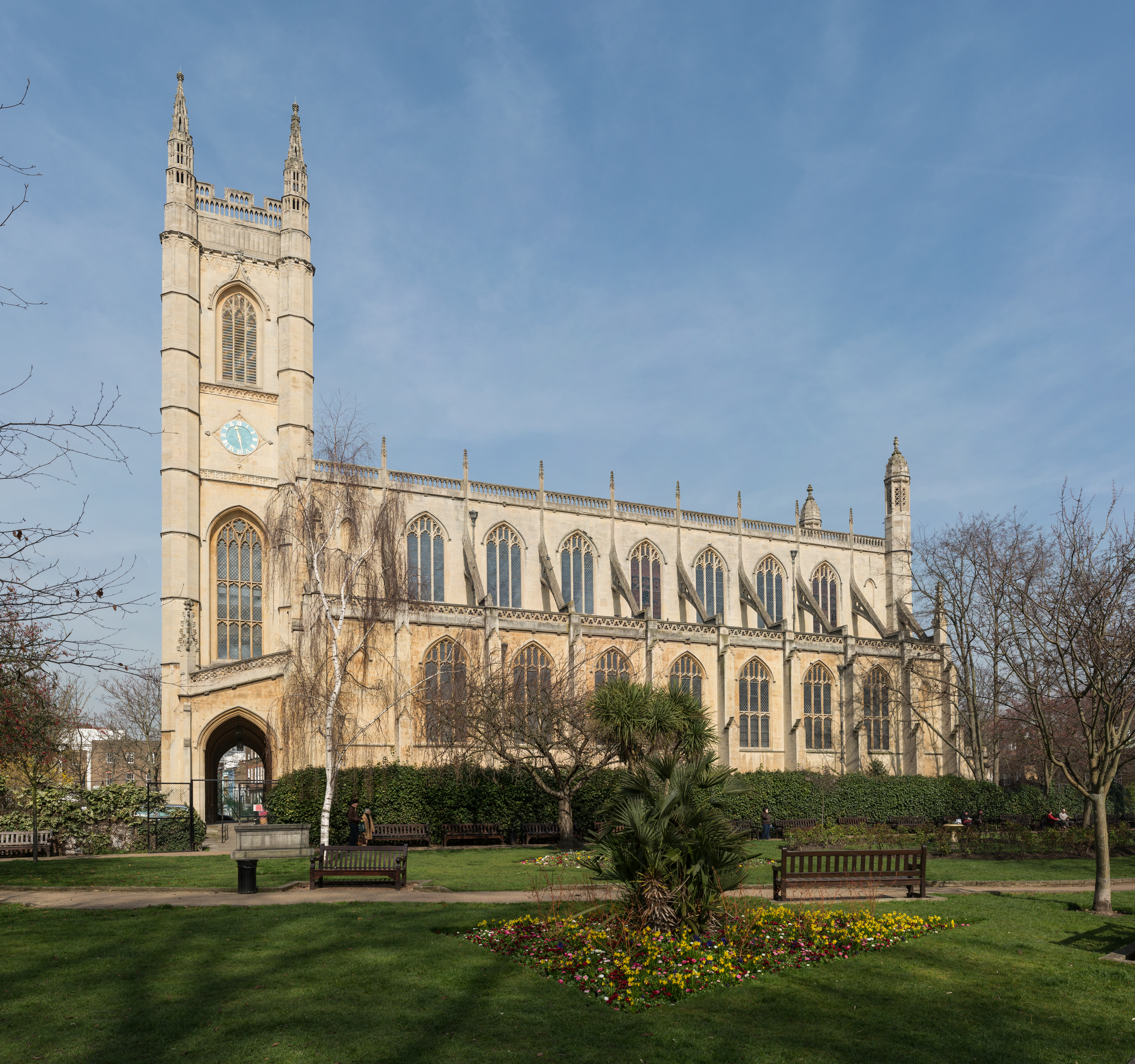
St Luke's Church, Chelsea, where Davey was buried

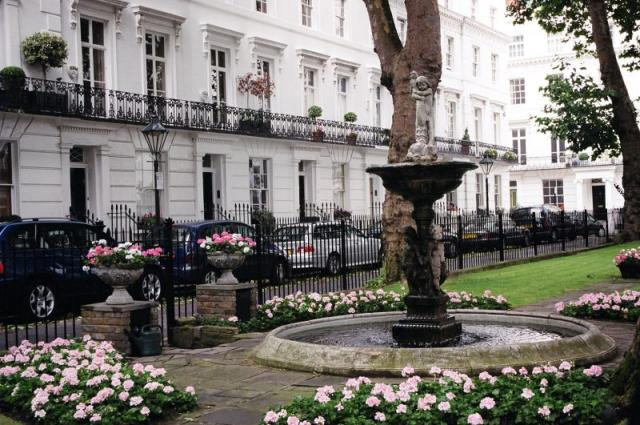
Wellington Square, Chelsea, built on the site of Davey's house and nursery

Thomas Davey died at the age of 77 on 25 April 1833 and was buried at St Luke's Church in Sydney Street, Chelsea. The antiquarian Samuel Shepherd, who worked for thirty years at the Chelsea Hospital near Davey's nursery, mentioned him in his incomplete and unpublished Notes on Old Chelsea, noting that a "muffled" peal of bells from the church was sounded out of respect at his funeral. The site of his nursery and house in Chelsea subsequently became Wellington Square, London.

Shepherd composed a poem "On the Death of Mr. Thomas Davey", in his memory using the ancient "Epitaph on Bion" (anon.) (Bion of Smyrna) as his model:

Ye beauteous offspring of the earth,
To which the gentle Spring gives birth;
Ye flowers he rear'd, you knew his worth,
Then bend your head;

You have escaped the east-wind cold,
With bloom perennial grow not old;
But hark! a muffled bell hath toll'd-
Davey is dead!

Let each young flow'ret fresh with life,
With all their early beauties rife,
Together join in mournful strife,
A wreath to thread;
Let roses twine with vermeil cheek,
With lily of the valley meek,
And tulips gay with many a streak,
For Davey's dead!

Your bloom he did with pleasure view,
Which Spring did constantly renew,
And ev'ry plant in order knew,
That deck'd each bed.
But from his garden death has torn,
No more he 'll greet the rising morn;
Be fill'd with tears, ye flowers forlorn;
Your friend is dead!

Though sun and showers each following year,
Shall with new life your blossoms rear;
No more on earth he will appear,-
From life he's fled;-
But in the dark and dreary tomb,
No more his pleasing toil resume,
While you each year shall bud and bloom,
Though Davey's dead!

== See also ==
- Tulip mania
