= Ray Harryhausen: Special Effects Titan =

- Film poster
- Directed by: Gilles Penso
- Produced by: Alexandre Poncet
- Edited by: Gilles Penso
- Music by: Alexandre Poncet
- Production companies: Frenetic Arts; The Ray & Diana Harryhausen Foundation
- Release date: November 27, 2011 (Paris)
- Running time: 95 minutes
- Countries: France; United Kingdom

Ray Harryhausen: Special Effects Titan is a 2011 documentary film on the life and work of Ray Harryhausen.

== Production ==
The film was made over a 10-year period and features interviews and tributes from filmmakers who were inspired by his work.

=== Interviewees ===
The animators, directors, actors and special effects artists interviewed for the film were:

- Peter Jackson
- Terry Gilliam
- Guillermo del Toro
- James Cameron
- Tim Burton
- Ray Harryhausen
- John Landis
- Henry Selick
- Ray Bradbury
- Nick Park
- Randy Cook
- Phil Tippett
- Steven Spielberg
- Dennis Muren
- Steven Johnson
- Joe Dante
- Vincenzo Natali
- John Lasseter
- Ken Ralston
- Robert Townson
- Christopher Young
- John Cairney
- Greg Broadmore
- Andrew Jones
- Martine Beswick
- Vanessa Harryhausen
- Caroline Munro

== Release ==
The film was shown at the Paris International Fantastic Film Festival on November 27, 2011.

== Reception ==
The Observer described the documentary as a "a riveting film by a French movie historian" and that it was "A continual delight." The Financial Times noted that specific scenes in the film, such as the tours of Harryhausen's workshop, and noted that "Perhaps the most fascinating point made in the film is that it was Harryhausen who invented the way we all think dinosaurs moved. Those gestures - agreed on now even by palaeontologists - actually first came from him." Michael Brooke writing for Sight and Sound described the film as "clearly a labour of love by all concerned" and an "*immensely engaging portrait of [Harryhausen]." He concluded that the film was "undoubtedly a hagiography, but noted the terms linguistic origin meaning "a saint's biography"."
