= Steal (film) =

2002 film by Gérard Pirès

- Directed by: Gérard Pirès
- Written by: Mark Ezra adapted by Gérard Pirès
- Produced by: Éric Altmayer; Nicolas Altmayer; Michael Cowan; Jason Piette
- Starring: Stephen Dorff; Natasha Henstridge; Bruce Payne; Steven Berkoff; Clé Bennett; Karen Cliche; Steven McCarthy; Alain Goulem
- Cinematography: Tetsuo Nagata
- Edited by: Véronique Lange
- Music by: Andy Gray
- Distributed by: Helkon SK Film Distribution (United Kingdom); Alliance Atlantis Releasing (Canada); SND Films (France); Remstar Media Partners
- Release date: November 12, 2002
- Running time: 81 minutes
- Countries: Canada; France; United Kingdom
- Language: English
- Budget: $15 million
- Box office: $7.6 million

Steal (originally titled Riders) is a 2002 action film directed by Gérard Pirès and starring Stephen Dorff, Natasha Henstridge, Bruce Payne, and Steven Berkoff. It was written by Mark Ezra and Pirès.

== Plot ==
Slim, Frank, Otis and Alex are a group of youthful bank robbers, who commit their crimes anonymously and in innovative ways involving extreme sports, such as skating and snowboarding. The group evades capture from the police, led by "hardboiled cop", lieutenant Macgruder, but an anonymous individual seems to know, who they are and threatens to inform the police, unless they undertake a robbery for him. Enter the Mob, represented, by underworld enforcer, Surtayne, who instructs the group to work for them also or they will all be killed. Slim becomes romantically involved with police detective, Karen, who distrusts Macgruder, and to save her and his friends escape from the threat of the anonymous man, and the Mob, Slim concocts a daring robbery.

== Cast ==
- Stephen Dorff as Slim
- Natasha Henstridge as Karen
- Bruce Payne as Lt Macgruder
- Steven Berkoff as Surtayne
- Cle Bennett as Otis
- Karen Cliche as Alex
- Steven McCarthy as Frank
- Alain Goulem as Pandelis
- Andreas Apergis as Nixdorfer
- Tom McCamus as Jerry
- Andy Bradshaw as Sargeant Garret
- David Gow as Charlie/Brinks
- Jamie Orchard as Newsreader
- Stephen Spreekmeester as Eddie/Brinks
- Mariusz Sibiga as Police officer

== Production ==
In March 2000, it was reported that Gérard Pirès was slated to direct Capital Offense by Georgio Serafini as his follow-up from his hit film Taxi, an independently produced action film starring Christopher Lambert for Richard Rionda’s Hannibal Films, Nicolas Altmayer’s France-based Mandarin, and Jonathan Vanger and Claude Leger’s Transfilm. The film would've followed Lambert as a disgraced detective who in a desperate move to clear his branding as his partner's murderer escapes and orchestrates a televised hostage crisis buying him an additional six hours to find who the true murderer is. Despite a $15 million budget secured from financing by Hannibal and Canal Plus and final negotiations with an unnamed Hollywood partner for distribution in the United States, Capital Offense ultimately ended up not being produced. In October of that year, it was reported that Pirès' next film would instead be Heist (aka 2-11) which would also mark Pirès' first time shooting in English. Stephen Dorff and Natasha Henstridge were announced as the film's leads with shooting scheduled to begin in February of next year. The film was produced as part of a three-picture co-production deal between UK production company Spice Factory and Canada’s Transfilm.

In February 2001, it was reported that Dimension Films, the genre arm of Miramax, had taken U.S. distribution rights to the film while TF1 would handle international sales.

== Release ==
Steal received a limited release in the United States on 25 April 2003, grossing $220,994. It went on to gross a total of $7,622,383 worldwide.

== Reception ==
The film has a rating of 29% on the film review website Rotten Tomatoes. BBC's Neil Smith awarded the film 2 out of 5 stars, calling it "gloriously terrible" and accusing it of trying to latch on to the popularity of xXx and Extreme Ops. He found an upside in fight choreography.
