= To Die For (1994 film) =

Film by Peter Mackenzie Litten

- Theatrical release poster
- Directed by: Peter Mackenzie Litten
- Written by: Johnny Byrne; Peter Mackinzie Litten; Paul McEvoy
- Produced by: Gary Fitzpatrick
- Starring: Thomas Arklie; Ian Williams; Tony Slattery; Dillie Keane; Jean Boht; John Altman; Caroline Munro
- Cinematography: John Ward
- Edited by: Jeffrey Arsenault
- Music by: Roger Bolton
- Production companies: TDF Production; The London Lighthouse; British Screen
- Distributed by: Metro Tartan Pictures
- Release date: 2 December 1994 (United Kingdom)
- Running time: 101 minutes
- Country: United Kingdom
- Language: English

To Die For is a 1994 British romantic comedy-drama film directed by Peter Mackenzie Litten and written by Johnny Byrne, Paul McEvoy and Litten. The film stars Thomas Arklie, Ian Williams, Tony Slattery, Dillie Keane, Jean Boht, John Altman and Caroline Munro.

== Plot ==
Set in London in the early 1990s, the film portrays the bittersweet lifestyles of a young gay couple in a fiery open relationship. Mark is an acerbic drag queen with a sharp tongue, who finds it difficult to accept his much better-looking partner's highly promiscuous lifestyle of non-stop clubbing and cruising. Worse still, Mark is HIV positive and his partner is negative.

Both of them are struggling to come to terms with Mark's deteriorating condition. Nowadays, Mark prefers to stay at home when not performing – working on his own panel of embroidery for an AIDS quilt memorial project. Simon, however, prefers to turn a blind eye to the situation and continues to cruise London's gay bars at night looking for action.

Mark dies early on in the story and Simon becomes the focus of the story as he buries his feelings and continues his torrid sex life. At first, he seems completely unaffected by his lover's death. However, when Mark returns to haunt him, his life suddenly becomes a lot more complex, especially as he is the only one who can see Mark.

It turns out that Mark has actually returned to help his partner to accept his true feelings and to encourage him to reassess his reckless lifestyle – a lifestyle that he is sure will never bring him the happiness he seeks. Eventually, Mark gets through to him and Simon breaks down and weeps for the very first time.

Mark's work is done and he can leave his one-time lover to move on with his life.

== Cast ==
- Thomas Arklie as Simon
- Ian Williams as Mark
- Tony Slattery as Terry
- Dillie Keane as Siobbah
- John Altman as Dogger
- Jean Boht as Mrs. Downs
- Caroline Munro as Mrs. Pignon
- Ian McKellen as Quilt Documentary Narrator
