= Peter Litten =

British film director and designer

Peter Mackenzie Litten (born 24 May 1960), is a British film director and designer who was educated at the Quaker Leighton Park School in Reading. His film credits include To Die For and Slaughter High.

Originally a special effects designer, he is also noted for creating the 'computer generated' TV character, Max Headroom. Since 1994, he has focussed on producing and directing short films for corporations and his work in this field has won awards including sixteen IVCA Awards.
