= Slaughter High =

- Theatrical release poster
- Directed by: Mark Ezra; Peter Litten; George Dugdale
- Written by: Mark Ezra; Peter Litten; George Dugdale
- Produced by: Dick Randall; Stephen Minasian
- Starring: Caroline Munro; Simon Scuddamore; Kelly Baker; Sally Cross; Billy Hartman; Carmine Iannaconne; Gary Martin; Michael Saffran; Josephine Scandi; John Segan; Donna Yeager
- Cinematography: Alan Pudney
- Edited by: Jim Connock
- Music by: Harry Manfredini
- Production company: Spectacular Trading International
- Distributed by: Vestron Pictures
- Release date: November 14, 1986 (U.S.)
- Running time: 91 minutes
- Country: United Kingdom
- Language: English
- Budget: $2.1 million

Slaughter High, originally titled Jolly Killer, is a 1986 British slasher film written and directed by George Dugdale, Mark Ezra and Peter Litten, and starring Caroline Munro, Simon Scuddamore, Carmine Iannaconne, Donna Yeager, and Sally Cross. The film follows a group of adults responsible for a prank gone wrong on April Fool's Day who are invited to a reunion at their defunct high school where a masked killer awaits inside.

Though set in an American high school, Slaughter High was filmed in England under the working title April Fool's Day. The film was re-titled after it was discovered that Paramount Pictures had a slasher film of the same name scheduled for release that same year.

Slaughter High was given a limited theatrical release in the United States on November 14, 1986. The release expanded over the following months, and the film continued to screen through the spring of 1987.

== Plot ==
On April Fools Day 1976, high school outcast Marty Rantzen is seduced by popular girl Carol Manning in the women's locker room. This is revealed as a prank as several students appear and mock Marty's naked body. Led by troublemaker Skip Pollack, the students physically abuse Marty before the coach intervenes. Later, two of the students, Ted Harrison and Carl Putney, feign remorse and offer Marty marijuana laced with something to make him sick. Skip messes with Marty's science project, accidentally setting off a chain of events which end with Marty being doused with nitric acid. Marty is left disfigured.

Carol meets Skip and the others at their high school reunion ten years later in 1986. They find they were the only ones invited, with the school long-vacant and in disrepair. They decide to break in and party, and unbeknownst to them, the school's caretaker Digby is killed by a man wearing a jester hat and an old man mask, the same ones Skip wore during the shower prank. Soon the friends begin dying in a variety of ways – Ted's stomach explodes upon drinking an acid-laced beer, Shirley is melted with acid while taking a bath, Carl is impaled while trying to escape in a car, Susan is killed off-screen, Joe is eviscerated by tractor blades, Stella and Frank are electrocuted while having sex, and Nancy is drowned in a cesspit. Skip is hanged by a noose but escapes.

The jester chases Carol throughout the school, and in her panic, she accidentally kills Skip with an axe to the face. Finally, the jester kills Carol with a javelin in the locker room where the initial prank occurred. Removing his mask, the jester is revealed as Marty, who revels in his revenge before he hallucinates and gets attacked by the spirits of the people he just slaughtered and passes out.

Marty wakes up in a hospital where he's recovering, with bandages on his face. A nurse walks in and comments that Marty's skin graft operation was successful. An alarm in his room is activated, and his doctor comes into the room to assist. Just as he does this, Marty switches places with the nurse, killing her. He turns around and then kills the doctor who has entered the room. Marty then rips off the new skin grafted to his face.

== Cast ==
- Simon Scuddamore as Marty Rantzen
- Caroline Munro as Carol Manning
- Carmine Iannaconne as Skip Pollack
- Donna Yeager as Stella
- Gary Martin as Joe
- Billy Hartman as Frank
- Michael Saffran as Ted Harrison
- John Segal as Carl Putney
- Kelly Baker as Nancy
- Sally Cross as Susan
- Josephine Scandi as Shirley
- Marc Smith as Coach
- Dick Randall as Manny
- Jon Clark as Digby
- Mark Ezra as Jester

== Production ==
It was originally filmed as April Fool's Day in late 1984 in London, England, and Virginia Water, Surrey on a budget of $2.1 million. However, the title was changed to Slaughter High after the filmmakers had learned of Paramount Pictures's slasher film of the same title scheduled for release of the same year.

Simon Scuddamore, the actor who portrayed Marty Rantzen, committed suicide by drug overdose on November 21, 1984, shortly after production had ended. Scuddamore was just 28 years old and Slaughter High would be his only film appearance.

== Release ==
The film was given a limited release theatrically in the United States by Vestron Pictures on November 14, 1986. The release expanded in February 1987, and again in April; it opened on a total of thirty-eight screens on April 24, earning $90,000 between April 24–27.

=== Critical response ===
Kevin Thomas of the Los Angeles Times reviewed the film favorably, noting: "In its primitive way, Slaughter High, is one of the better teen revenge horror pictures", adding that the film "benefits greatly from its authentic setting, a big, old derelict Tudor-style school building in a remote area, gets actually quite scary, yet the special effects are of the darkly comic, Grand Guignol variety". Terry Lawson of the Dayton Daily News was critical of the performances, particularly the English actors' attempts at portraying an American accent, adding that the film "invites comment as much for its oddness as for its awfulness".

On Rotten Tomatoes the film has a 0% approval rating based on reviews from 5 critics. AllMovie wrote: "Slaughter High gets a passing grade for the die-hard genre fans, but is worthless for most any other audience".

=== Home media ===
Slaughter High was released as April Fool's Day on VHS in Japan by Vestron International and on DVD in the United Kingdom by Arrow Video. To date, these are the only countries to have a home-video release of the film under its original title.

The film was released by Lionsgate on April 15, 2009, on DVD as part of their "Lost Collection", which contains unrated Vestron full-screen VHS master print. It was re-released on January 4, 2011, in a "4-Film Collection" set along with My Best Friend Is a Vampire, Repossessed and Silent Night, Deadly Night 3: Better Watch Out!. Arrow Video released a "Special Edition" DVD in the United Kingdom in July 2011. Lionsgate released the film on DVD in 2012 in an eight horror film DVD set which also includes Class of 1999, Waxwork, 976-Evil II, The Unholy, C.H.U.D. II: Bud the C.H.U.D., Ghoulies III: Ghoulies Go to College and Chopping Mall.

Under the new Vestron Video Collector's Series line, Lionsgate released the film for the first time on Blu-ray on October 31, 2017.

== Sources ==
- Harper, Jim (2004). Legacy of Blood: A Comprehensive Guide to Slasher Movies. Manchester, England: Critical Vision. ISBN 978-1-900-48639-2.
