= Wellington Square, Chelsea =

Garden square in Chelsea, London, England

Coordinates: 51°29′21″N 0°09′46″W

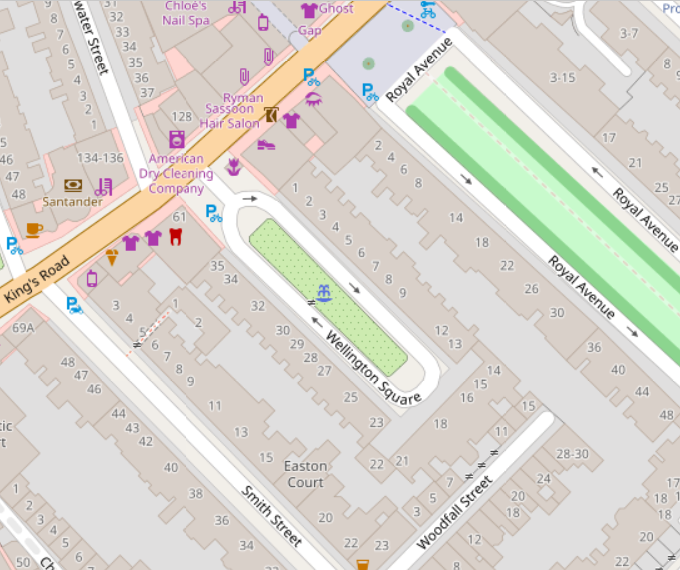
Wellington Square area map

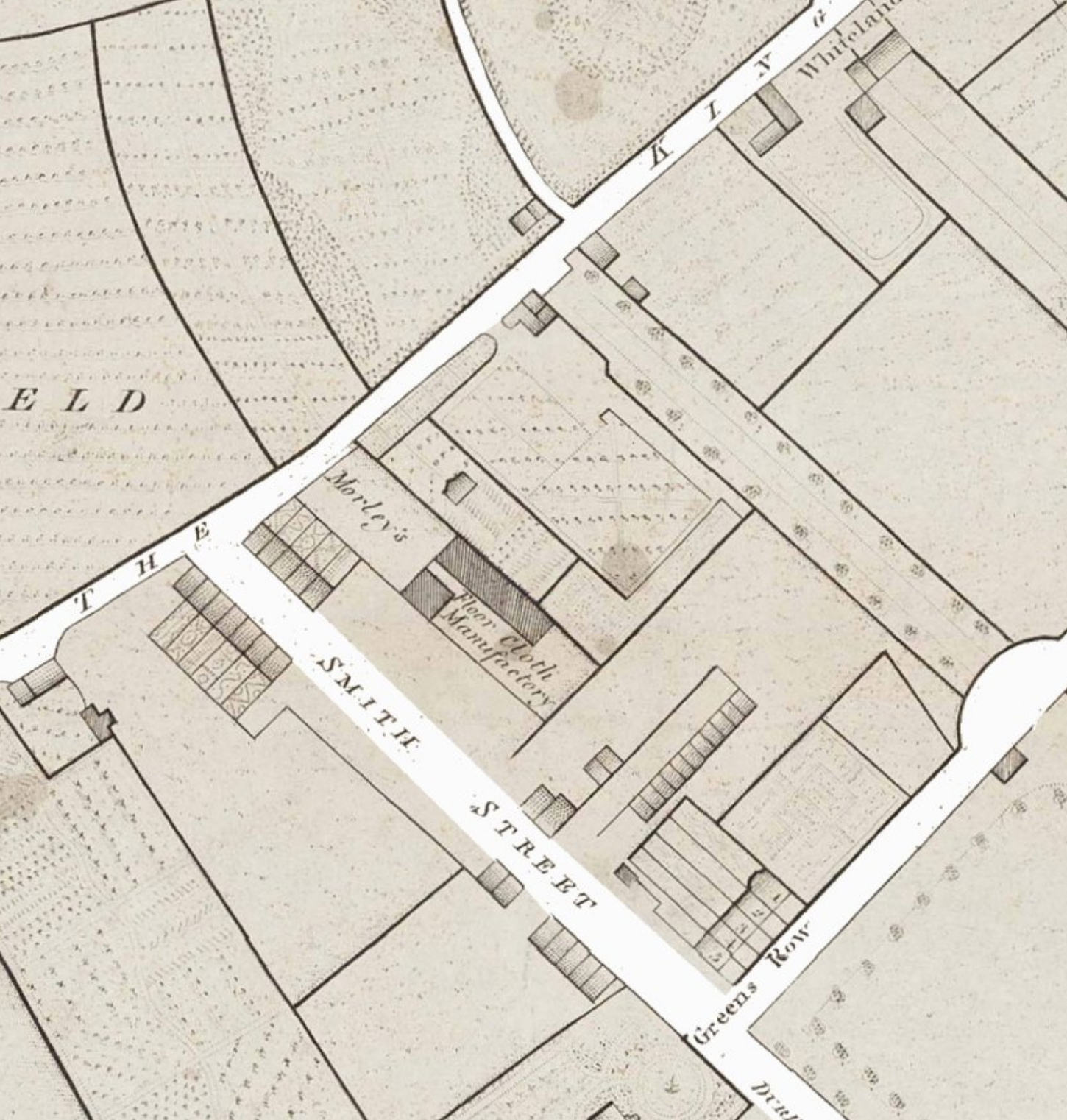
King's Road and Smith Street c.1800 before the development of Wellington Square. The site of the square is adjacent to the plot marked Morley's.

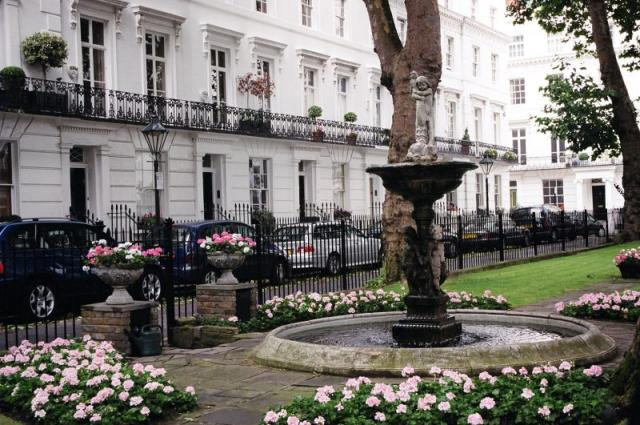
Garden fountain in Wellington Square

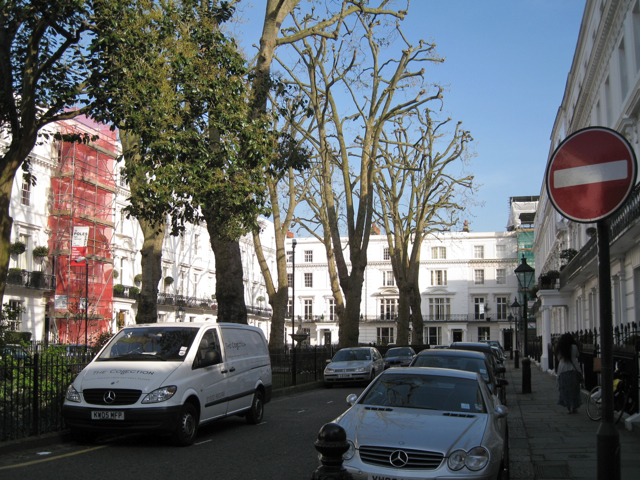
Wellington Square south side

Wellington Square is a garden square in Chelsea, London, off the south side of the King's Road. It was built in the first decades of the nineteenth century on the former site of a nursery owned by the florist and "well-known tulip-fancier" Thomas Davey and named after the Duke of Wellington. The square consists of 35 five-storey terraced stucco houses around a central garden with a fountain. The whole square is grade II listed with Historic England.

In 1870 it was the location of a double-murder. A. A. Milne, creator of Winnie-the-Pooh, lived there in the early 1900s as well as the notorious occultist Aleister Crowley in the 1920s. It was the home of fictional spy James Bond. Other notable former residents include the geologist Samuel Joseph Mackie at number 11 and the miniaturist Alice Rischgitz at number 12.

== Origins ==
The square is named after Arthur Wellesley, 1st Duke of Wellington, and is a cul-de-sac consisting of 35 five-storey terraced stucco houses built in the early to mid-nineteenth century. It was built on the site of a nursery owned by the florist and "well-known tulip-fancier" Thomas Davey (c.1758–1833). The whole square is grade II listed with Historic England.

== The Chelsea murders ==
In 1870, the reverend Elias Huelin (born 1786) and his housekeeper Ann Boss were murdered at number 24 by odd-job man Walter Millar, who was undertaking work on the house which was owned by Huelin. Huelin was assistant chaplain at Brompton Cemetery and a prominent local property owner and landlord, who lived nearby at 15 Paultons Square. Millar was later hanged for his crimes.

== James Bond ==
In Ian Fleming's books featuring the secret agent James Bond, Bond is described as living in a ground floor flat in a square lined with plane trees in Chelsea off the King's Road. According to Fleming's biographer and friend John Pearson, Bond probably lived in Wellington Square, possibly at number 30. This view of a Wellington Square residence is shared by the author William Boyd, who wrote an article on the subject for The Times Literary Supplement in 2020, "The spies who lived here: How I found James Bond’s precise address", but after extensive research concluded that Bond lived at number 25, not number 30. Fleming lived nearby at 24 Cheyne Walk when he put the finishing touches to the first Bond novel, Casino Royale (1953). John Le Carre's fictional spy George Smiley lived nearby at 9 Bywater Street.

== Former residents ==
- A. A. Milne, creator of Winnie-the-Pooh, lived at number 8 from 1904 where he wrote Lovers of London.
- Geologist Samuel Joseph Mackie lived at number 11.
- Miniaturist Alice Rischgitz lived at number 12.
- Aleister Crowley, described in the British press as the "wickedest man in the world", lived at number 31 in 1922 where he wrote The Diary of a Drug Fiend.
- Number 32 was the home of the fictional characters Lucy Carlesi (Joan Collins) and Gino Carlesi (Ralph Bates) in the horror film I Don't Want to Be Born (1975).
