= Flesh for the Beast =

2003 American fantasy-horror film by Terry M. West

- DVD cover
- Directed by: Terry M. West
- Written by: Terry M. West
- Starring: Jane Scarlett; Sergio Jones; Clark Beasley Jr.
- Cinematography: Richard Siegel
- Edited by: Andrew Sterling
- Music by: Buckethead
- Production companies: Fever Dreams, Media Blasters
- Distributed by: IndieFlix, M.I.B. (Germany), Shriek Show
- Release date: September 27, 2003
- Running time: 89 minutes
- Country: United States
- Language: English

Flesh for the Beast is a 2003 fantasy-horror film directed and written by Terry M. West. The film was released on September 27, 2003. The plot concerns a group of parapsychologists that investigate a haunted mansion and end up finding more than they expected. A graphic novel tie-in was released the following year through Media Blasters.

== Synopsis ==
A group of parapsychologists are called in to investigate a mansion with a reputation for being haunted, as it was previously a brothel where many men went missing. One of the investigators, Erin Cooper (Jane Scarlett) finds herself particularly drawn to the place. As the night progresses the group discovers that they are not alone and that three succubi inhabit the house, imprisoned by a warlock's amulet. The amulet would give its user the ability to control the succubi, giving them extreme amounts of power. The succubi kill the group members one by one as the group tries desperately to discover the amulet's whereabouts and perform a ritual that would stop the succubi. The survivors are eventually pared down to two people, one of which finds the amulet but is killed while trying to begin the ritual. The survivor, Erin, is then revealed to have been a succubus all along. She had been the warlock's favorite and somehow had lost her memories and gained the ability to leave the mansion. Erin then rejoins the other succubi in the mansion.

== Cast ==
- Jennifer Leigh (as Jane Scarlett) as Erin Cooper
- Sergio Jones as John Stoker
- Clark Beasley, Jr. as Ted Sturgeon
- Jim Coope as Jack Ketchum (as Jim Coop)
- David Runco as Joseph Monks (as Victor Flynn)
- Aaron Clayton as Douglas Clegg
- Michael Sinterniklaas as Martin Shelly
- Caroline Hoermann as Pauline
- Ruby Larocca as Cassandra (as Ruby LaRocca)
- Barbara Joyce as Irene
- Kevin G. Shinnick as Jimmy / Zombie
- Keith Leopard as Zombie #1
- Kelly Troy Howard as Zombie #2
- Zoe Moonshine as Zombie #3
- Michael Roszhart as Zombie #4
- Caroline Munro as Carla, the Gypsy

== Graphic novel ==
On October 26, 2004 a graphic novel tie-in was released through Media Blasters. The book did not adapt the movie, but instead consisted of several stories that centered around the succubi's life in the mansion. The stories ranged in tone from horror to comedy, and were mostly one-shot episodes that did not reference one another. The only exception was one story that referenced one of the other comics, as one story involved a succubus that had gotten pregnant due to her falling in love with a college professor.

== Web series ==
In 2013 filming began for a web series sequel entitled Flesh for the Beast: Tsukiko's Curse. Written and directed by Carl Morano, the series will consist of 6 episodes and star Maho Honda as a young psychic that leads a group of paranormal researchers into deadly occult cases. Filming took place in the New York/New Jersey area during July 2013. The first episode screened on December 16, 2013 at the Bizarre AC film festival. The series is available on Netflix and Crunchyroll. The series began airing on broadcast television on Toku on July 5, 2017.

== Reception ==
Critical reception for Flesh for the Beast was mixed to negative, and the film holds a rating of 50% "rotten" on Rotten Tomatoes based upon 10 reviews and a Metacritic rating of 28 based on 5 reviews. A reviewer for the New York Times commented that the film would appeal most to "gore hounds" and was reminiscent of "the grisly Italian horror films of the 1970's and 80's, and in particular those directed by Lucio Fulci". In contrast, a reviewer for TV Guide panned the film as "Derivative, indifferently acted, artlessly photographed and awash in nudity and rudimentary gore effects".
