= Boris Karloff: The Man Behind the Monster =

2021 American-British documentary film

- Promotional release poster
- Directed by: Thomas Hamilton
- Written by: Thomas Hamilton; Ron MacCloskey
- Narrated by: Paul Ryan
- Cinematography: Bruce Heinsius
- Edited by: Anuree De Silva; Folasade Oyeleye
- Music by: Laura Forrest Hay
- Production company: Voltage Films
- Release date: September 17, 2021
- Running time: 98 minutes
- Country: United States
- Language: English

Boris Karloff: The Man Behind the Monster is a 2021 American-British documentary film about the life and career of English actor Boris Karloff, who was known for his roles in horror films. The documentary was directed and written by Thomas Hamilton and co-produced with Ron MacCloskey.

The film features interviews with such subjects as Guillermo del Toro, John Landis, Joe Dante, Christopher Plummer, Peter Bogdanovich, Ron Perlman, Leonard Maltin, Christopher Frayling, Sara Karloff, Roger Corman, Dick Miller (in his last filmed interview), biographer Stephen Jacobs with artwork specially created by artist Joe Liotta, and a music score by Laura Forrest Hay.

== Production ==
The project began life in the late 1990s as a passion project for co-producer and co-writer Ron MacCloskey, who travelled internationally to research Karloff over a period of 20 years. During this time several attempts were made to mount the project, but funding and the right collaborator proved elusive.

In June 2018, MacCloskey contacted filmmaker Thomas Hamilton, whose 2016 documentary Leslie Howard: The Man who Gave a Damn had its US TV premiere on Turner Classic Movies on 4 June 2018.

Hamilton was intrigued by the concept of a documentary on the man whose career essentially covered the history of horror prior to 1970 and agreed to co-produce and direct through his company Voltage Films Ltd.

Desiring to produce the definitive documentary on Karloff, Hamilton and MacCloskey decided the best format would be a four hour documentary, in two parts. Although the final film would run 98 minutes, it was as a result of this initial brief that an unusually large number of interviews were filmed.

Following a successful Kickstarter campaign in September 2018, Hamilton and MacCloskey filmed 55 interviews and location footage in Toronto, New York, Los Angeles, Atlanta, Alaska and London over a period of 16 months. Filming concluded in January 2020, by which time over 100 hours of material was in the can.

A five-minute trailer for the documentary was uploaded to YouTube in September 2020.

In March 2021, Hamilton produced a 20 minute teaser of the opening of the film, which was shared with interested producers only. In May 2021, on the strength of this teaser (which closely resembled the opening section of the film), distributor Abramorama and Shout! Studio came on board with a pre-sale and theatrical distribution deal to allow completion and release of the documentary in US theatres.

== Release and reception ==
Boris Karloff: The Man Behind the Monster was released theatrically on September 17, 2021, to coincide with the 90th anniversary of the release of the 1931 film Frankenstein, in which Karloff portrayed Frankenstein's monster, in November 2021.

The film was made available via Streaming service Shudder from January 2022. Although editing and post-production of Boris Karloff: The Man Behind the Monster took place entirely in London, as of September 2023, the film has yet to receive a screening in the United Kingdom.

On the review aggregator website Rotten Tomatoes, 91% of 23 critics' reviews are positive, with an average rating of 7.4/10. The website's consensus reads: "With swift pacing and an engagingly straightforward style, Boris Karloff: The Man Behind the Monster offers an impressively rich and entertaining overview of the actor's career."

=== Blu-ray and DVD release ===
Hamilton and MacCloskey are both devoted to the concept of physical media and in October 2022, released the film in Blu-ray, DVD and Limited Edition Dual Format versions. The Blu-ray and DVD include a bonus documentary in the form of a 120 minute feature, Boris Karloff: The Rest of the Story. Voltage Films is currently working on an upgraded version of Boris Karloff: The Rest of the Story.

=== Awards ===
The film's producers received the Rondo Hatton Award for Best Documentary of 2021 and Best DVD Features in 2022.
