= Captain Kronos – Vampire Hunter =

1974 British film by Brian Clemens

- Theatrical release poster
- Directed by: Brian Clemens
- Written by: Brian Clemens
- Produced by: Albert Fennell; Brian Clemens
- Starring: Horst Janson; John Cater; John Carson; Caroline Munro; Shane Briant; Ian Hendry; Wanda Ventham
- Cinematography: Ian Wilson
- Edited by: James Needs
- Music by: Laurie Johnson
- Production company: Hammer Film Productions
- Distributed by: AVCO Embassy Pictures; Bruton Films (UK); Paramount Pictures (US)
- Release date: 1973 (UK)
- Running time: 91 minutes
- Country: United Kingdom
- Language: English
- Budget: £160,000

Captain Kronos – Vampire Hunter is a 1973 British swashbuckling action horror film, written and directed by Brian Clemens, produced by Clemens and Albert Fennell for Hammer Film Productions, and starring Horst Janson, John Carson, Shane Briant, and Caroline Munro. The music score was composed by Laurie Johnson, supervised by Philip Martell. Shot in 1972, but belatedly released in 1973 in the UK (and in June 1974 in the US), the film was intended as the first in a series focused on the title character and his companions. Due to the film's violence and sexual subtext, Captain Kronos was rated R in North America. This was Clemens' only film as a director.

== Plot ==
Dr Marcus calls in Captain Kronos, an old friend from his war service, to his village which is plagued by deaths marked by highly accelerated aging. Kronos and his companion, the hunchback Professor Hieronymus Grost, are professional vampire hunters. Grost explains to the initially sceptical Marcus that the dead women are victims of a vampire who drains not blood but youth, and that there are "as many species of vampire as there are beasts of prey". The discovery of another victim confirms Grost's explanation. Along the way, Kronos and Grost take in a local Romani girl, Carla, who was sentenced to the pillory for dancing on the Sabbath. She repays the duo by helping them hunt the vampire and later becomes Kronos's lover.

Grost and Kronos conduct a mystical test that indicates the presence of vampires. Their findings are contradicted by an eyewitness who claims to have seen "someone old, very old", whereas a youth-draining vampire should appear youthful.

Marcus visits the family of his late friend, Lord Hagen Durward, and speaks with Durward's son, Paul, and his sister Sara. He must leave before speaking with the bed-ridden Lady Durward. While riding through the woods, Marcus encounters a cloaked figure that leaves him shaken, and he finds blood on his lips.

At a tavern, Kronos defeats thugs led by Kerro, who were hired by Lady Durward's coachman to murder him. Kronos, Grost, Marcus and Carla set up a network of alarm bells in the woods to announce the passage of vampires. Meanwhile, a bat attacks and kills a young woman. Marcus realises that he has become a vampire and begs Kronos to kill him. After various methods (including impalement with a stake and hanging) fail, Kronos accidentally pierces Marcus's chest with a cross of steel that Marcus had been wearing round his neck.

Having thus determined the vampire's weakness, Kronos and Grost obtain a wooden cross inlaid with steel from a cemetery. They are accosted by angry villagers, who believe that they murdered Marcus. Grost forges the cross into a sword, while Kronos conducts a knightly vigil. After seeing the Durward carriage flee the scene of a vampire attack, Kronos suspects Sara as the vampire.

Carla seeks refuge at Durward Manor to distract the household while Kronos sneaks inside. The "bedridden" Lady Durward reveals herself as the newly youthful vampire, and she hypnotises Carla and the Durward siblings. Lady Durward has raised her husband Hagen from the grave. She offers the mesmerised Carla to her husband, but Kronos erupts from hiding. Kronos uses the new sword's mirrored blade to turn Lady Durward's hypnotic gaze against her. He kills Lord Durward in a duel, and then destroys Lady Durward.

The next day, Kronos bids Carla goodbye, before he and Grost ride on to new adventures.

== Cast ==
- Horst Janson as Captain Kronos
  - Julian Holloway as the voice of Captain Kronos
- John Cater as Professor Hieronymus Grost
- Caroline Munro as Carla
- John Carson as Dr. Marcus
- Shane Briant as Paul Durward
- Wanda Ventham as Lady Durward
- Ian Hendry as Kerro
- Lois Daine as Sara Durward
- William Hobbs as Hagen
- Paul Greenwood as Giles
- Lisa Collings as Vanda Sorell
- Brian Tully as George Sorell
- Robert James as Pointer
- Perry Soblosky as Barlow
- John Hollis as barman
- Susanna East as Isabella Sorell
- Stafford Gordon as Barton Sorell
- Elizabeth Dear as Ann Sorell
- Joanna Ross as Myra
- Neil Seiler as priest
- Olga Anthony as Lilian
- Gigi Gurpinar as blind girl
- Peter Davidson as big man
- Terence Sewards as Tom
- Trevor Lawrence as Deke
- Jacqui Cook as barmaid
- B. H. Barry, Michael Buchanan, Steve James, Ian McKay, Barry Smith, Roger Williams as villagers
- Linda Cunningham as Jane
- Caroline Villiers as Petra

== Critical reception ==
The Monthly Film Bulletin wrote: "Neither straightfaced horror nor consistent send-up, it touches on too many conventions – Western, Grand Guignol, comic strip, movie serial – too quickly for the question of exact tone or proper genre ever really to be raised. (...) The film works best when the action is just allowed to barrel along, given the occasional nudge by an absurd line of dialogue."

Variety wrote that the film "features a lot of kinky plot lines but never follows through. More bohemian audiences may find all manners of turn on, but the whole is an uneven tease ..."

The Radio Times Guide to Films Alan Jones gave the film 3/5 stars, writing: "a bright and breezy blend of horror, comedy, swashbuckler and Italian western (...) A fun fear-frolic that became an instant Hammer cult."

Leslie Halliwell called the film a "lively horror yarn with amusing asides."

AllMovie called the film "one of the last great Hammer Films productions".

== Novelizations ==
A novelization of the film with the title Kronos was written by Hugh Enfield and published by Fontana Books (ISBN 978-0-00-613056-7) in the United Kingdom in 1972.

A new novelization written by Guy Adams, also under the title Kronos, was published in 2011 by Arrow Publishing, in association with Hammer and the Random House Group (ISBN 978-0-09-955624-4).

== Comic book adaptations ==
- The House of Hammer #1–3 (Oct. 1976-Jan. 1977), by Steve Moore and Ian Gibson — a "sequel" rather than an adaptation
- Hammer's Halls of Horror #20 (May 1978), by Steve Moore and Steve Parkhouse
- Captain Kronos — Vampire Hunter #1–4 (Titan Comics, Oct. 2017 – [Jan.] 2018), by Dan Abnett and Tom Mandrake

== See also ==
- Vampire films
- List of vampire films
