= Model animation =

Stop motion animation

Model animation is a form of stop motion animation designed to merge with live-action footage to create the illusion of a real-world fantasy sequence.

== History ==
=== Origins (1915–1925) ===
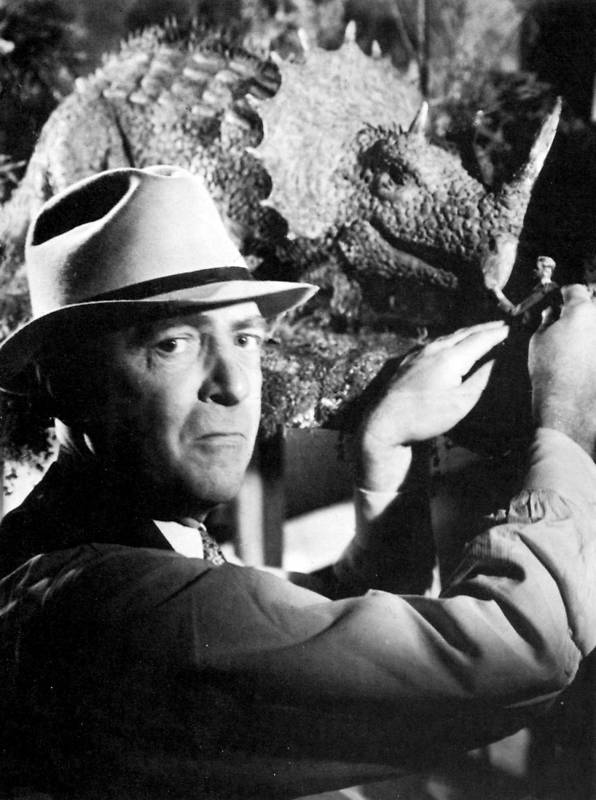
Willis H. O'Brien pictured with a model dinosaur (1931)

Model animation grew out of the experiments of American sculptor Willis H. O'Brien. In 1915, after a San Francisco exhibitor saw his test footage of a model dinosaur, O'Brien was commissioned to make The Dinosaur and the Missing Link: A Prehistoric Tragedy on a budget of $5,000. The short ran about five minutes but took two months to animate. Thomas Edison was impressed by the film, and O'Brien went on to make a series of prehistoric-themed shorts for the Edison Company.

O'Brien's first feature-length showcase was The Lost World (1925), which established the core idea of the technique: articulated models animated one frame at a time and combined with footage of live actors.

=== The O'Brien era (1933–1949) ===
The technique reached a mass audience with King Kong (1933). The film was originally allocated $500,000 and ran about $270,000 over budget; RKO, which had gone into receivership on the day of the New York premiere, earned $1,761,000 from the film in its first year of release. A sequel, Son of Kong, followed the same year.

In 1949 O'Brien supervised the effects for Mighty Joe Young, hiring a young Ray Harryhausen, who performed much of the animation. The film won the Academy Award for special effects, though it lost money at the box office and was the last major animated film O'Brien made.

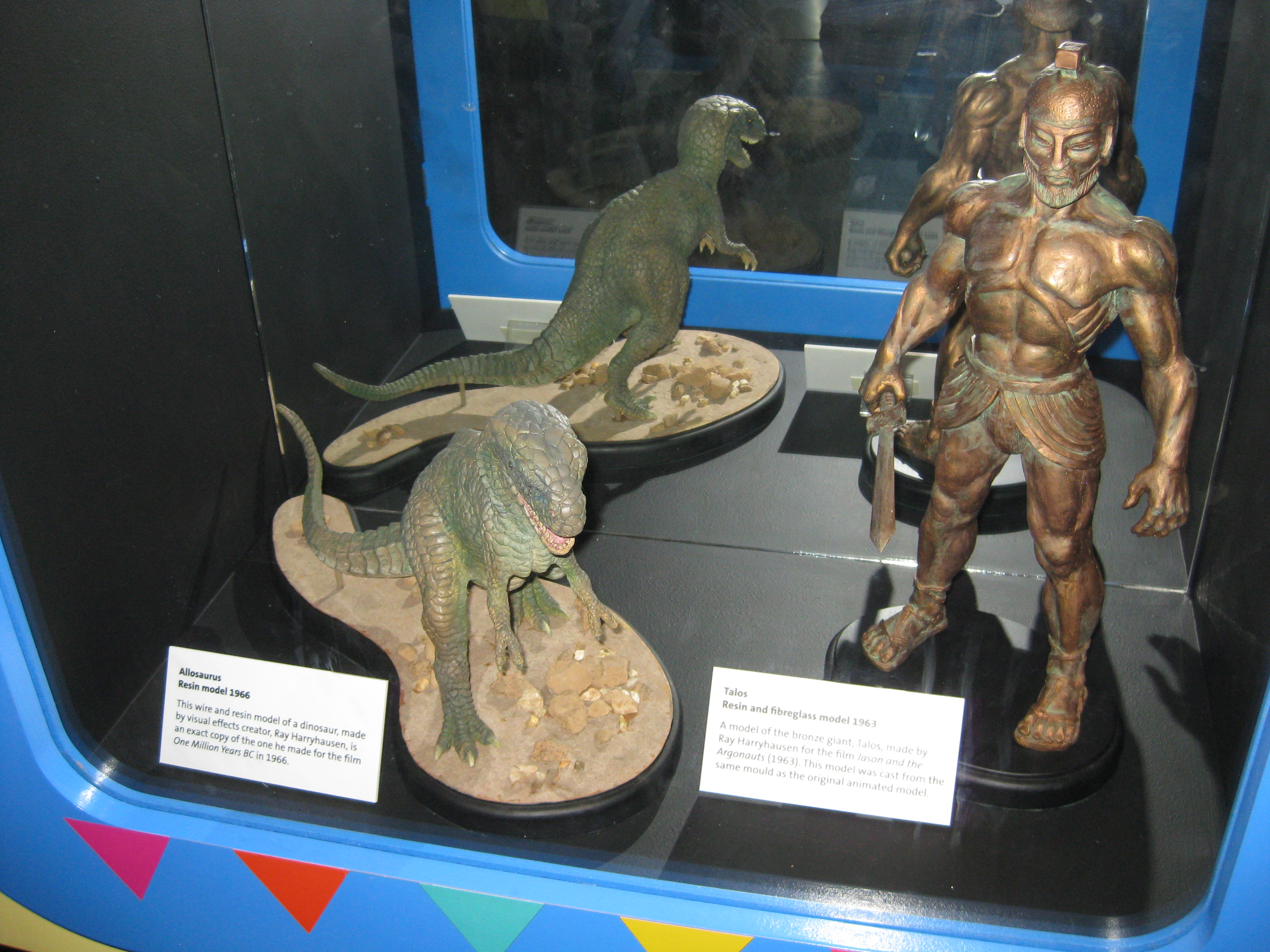
Two permanent models made by Ray Harryhausen at the National Media Museum

=== Harryhausen and Dynamation (1953–1981) ===
Harryhausen refined the process over the following three decades. The 7th Voyage of Sinbad (1958) was the first film to use his "Dynamation" process, which combined three-dimensional animated figures with live actors, and it brought model animation into full color. Through the 1960s and 1970s Harryhausen and producer Charles H. Schneer produced a series of mythological and fantasy features, including Jason and the Argonauts (1963) and two further Sinbad films.

Clash of the Titans (1981) was Harryhausen's final feature as producer and effects creator. It was released just as Hollywood's effects practices were beginning to shift away from stop motion.

=== The third generation and go motion (1980–1993) ===
A third generation of animators, including Phil Tippett, Jim Danforth and David W. Allen, applied model animation to more targeted effects shots inside larger productions. For the Battle of Hoth in The Empire Strikes Back (1980), effects artist Dennis Muren pushed for stop motion for the AT-AT walkers, citing the influence of King Kong. Tippett's work on the dragon in Dragonslayer (1981) used "go motion," a refinement that added motion blur to each frame, and earned him his first Academy Award nomination.

=== Decline and legacy (1993–present) ===
Steven Spielberg originally hired Tippett to create the dinosaurs of Jurassic Park (1993) using go motion, but after Industrial Light & Magic produced a convincing computer-generated test, the production switched to CGI. Tippett later described the film as "the melting of the glacier" for stop-motion effects in live-action features. He stayed on to supervise the animation of the film's dinosaur shots, applying his knowledge of creature movement to the new digital tools.

Although largely replaced by CGI in mainstream features, model animation remains influential: filmmakers including Steven Spielberg, James Cameron, Peter Jackson and Tim Burton have cited Harryhausen as an influence on their work.

== Types ==
Many types of models have been created and developed, and the choice mainly depends on the budget of the film:

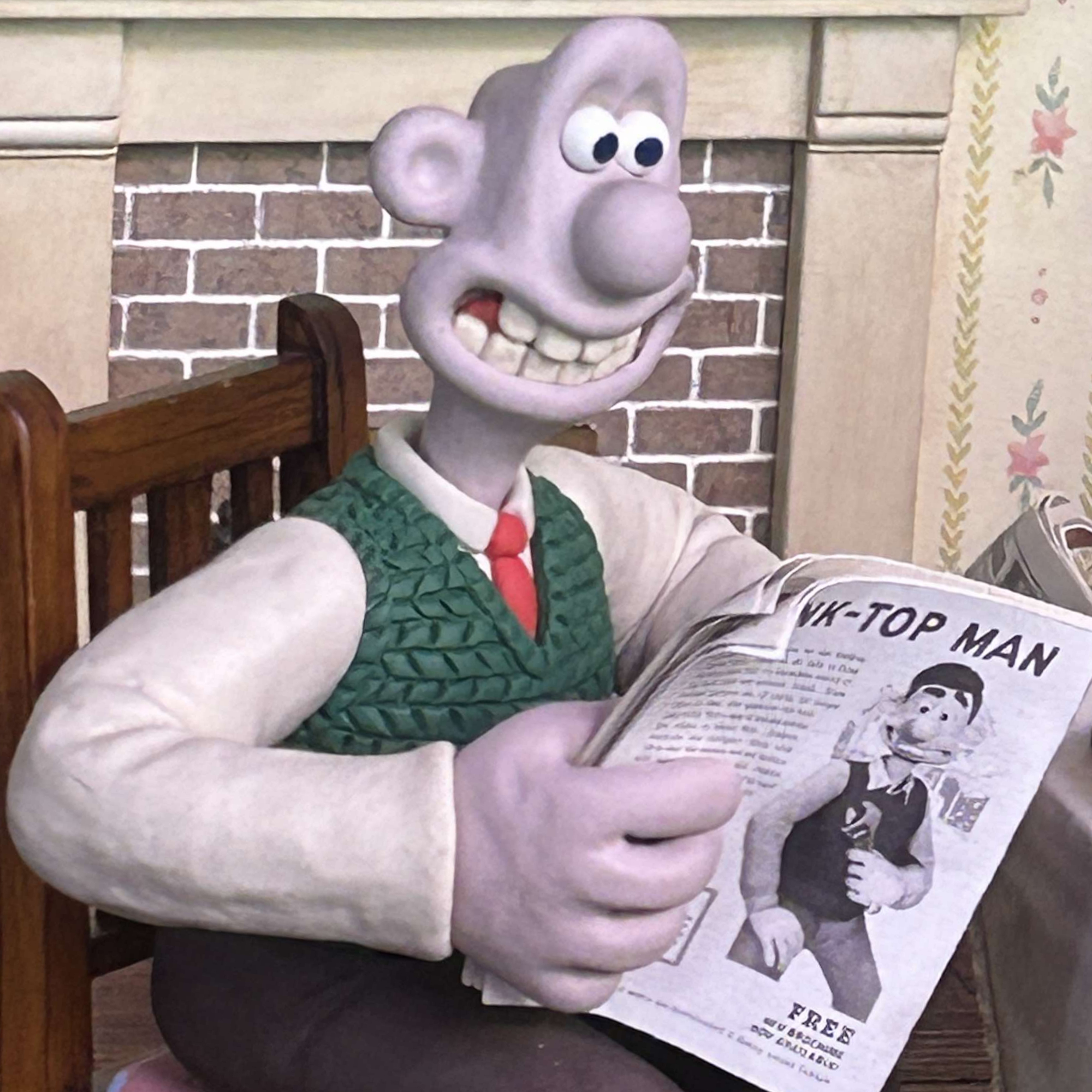
Example of a Clay Model in Wallace and Gromit

Clay models: Clay models are used for clay animation, also called claymation. These models require armatures, a wire skeleton needed to ensure stability while moving figures into a variety of poses. A malleable material, most commonly plasticine, is then built around the armature and sculpted to create a figure. Clay is a lower budget option for stop-motion productions.

Built-up models: These types of models are more expensive and detailed than clay models. They are made by building up pieces of foam on a metal skeleton to create a body, and then either brushing on several layers of liquid latex or casting soft rubbery skins and attaching them to the padded armature.

Mechanical puppet models: These types of models are the most expensive used in the industry and are longer-lasting than the other types. They start as clay sculptures onto which two- (or more) part molds are made in order to reproduce all the details. Then the mold parts are assembled with an armature inside, and they are filled with a liquid material (foam latex, silicone rubber, urethane foam, etc.) that then forms a soft rubbery "flesh" over the skeleton. The puppets head and facial expressions are controlled by clock-like mechanisms allowing for increasingly precise movement.

Replacement models: Replacement models allow for the consistent use of one bodily structure while replacing a models features such as the head, mouth, hair, and clothing. 3D printed replacements have gained popularity offering increased consistency and accuracy, making stop-motion animations visually comparable to CGI animations.

== Animation process ==
Model animation uses physical, three dimensional figures that are photographed and moved frame-by-frame to create the illusion of natural movement. The process begins by constructing the model. Animators may create drawings to design the characters appearance and proportions prior to building the internal armature.

During filming, the animator positions the model in front of a camera and captures a single frame. The model is then moved slightly before another frame is photographed. This process continues until the desired movement has been recorded. Frame rates vary, from 12 frames per second creating a noticeable stop-motion picture, to 30 frames per second creating a smooth visual but requiring intensive labor and movement of the models. In Coraline (2009), there are 24 frames per second with movement in every frame, being the first stop-motion movie to accomplish this.

Model animation can also be used in collaboration with visual effects. This process involves placing models in live-action footage, allowing figures to appear alongside real actors in real environments.

In 2018, LAIKA studios published Shooting a Frame: A Look Behind the Scenes at the Making of Coraline on YouTube that highlights the process of model animation in a stop-motion scene.

== Works ==
Model animation was pioneered by Willis H. O'Brien, and it was first used in The Lost World (1925). His work also includes

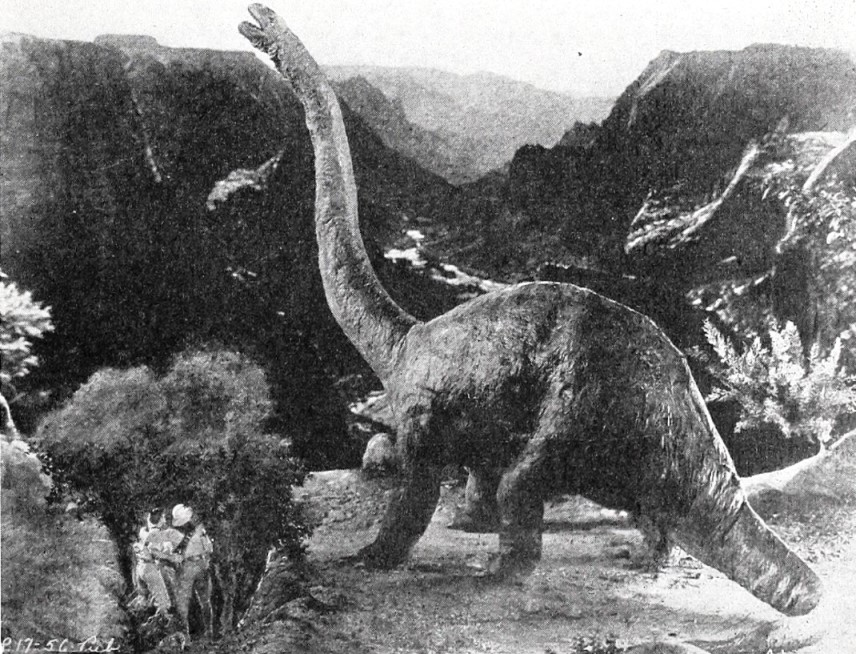
Dinosaur model from The Lost World (1925)

- King Kong (1933)
- Son of Kong (1933)
- Mighty Joe Young (1949)
- The Black Scorpion (1957)
- The Giant Behemoth (1958)

Picking up the model animation baton from O'Brien, and refining the process further, introducing color and smoother animation, was his protégé, Ray Harryhausen. Assisting O'Brien in Mighty Joe Young in 1949, Harryhausen went on to do model animation (and other special visual effects) on a series of feature-length films, such as:

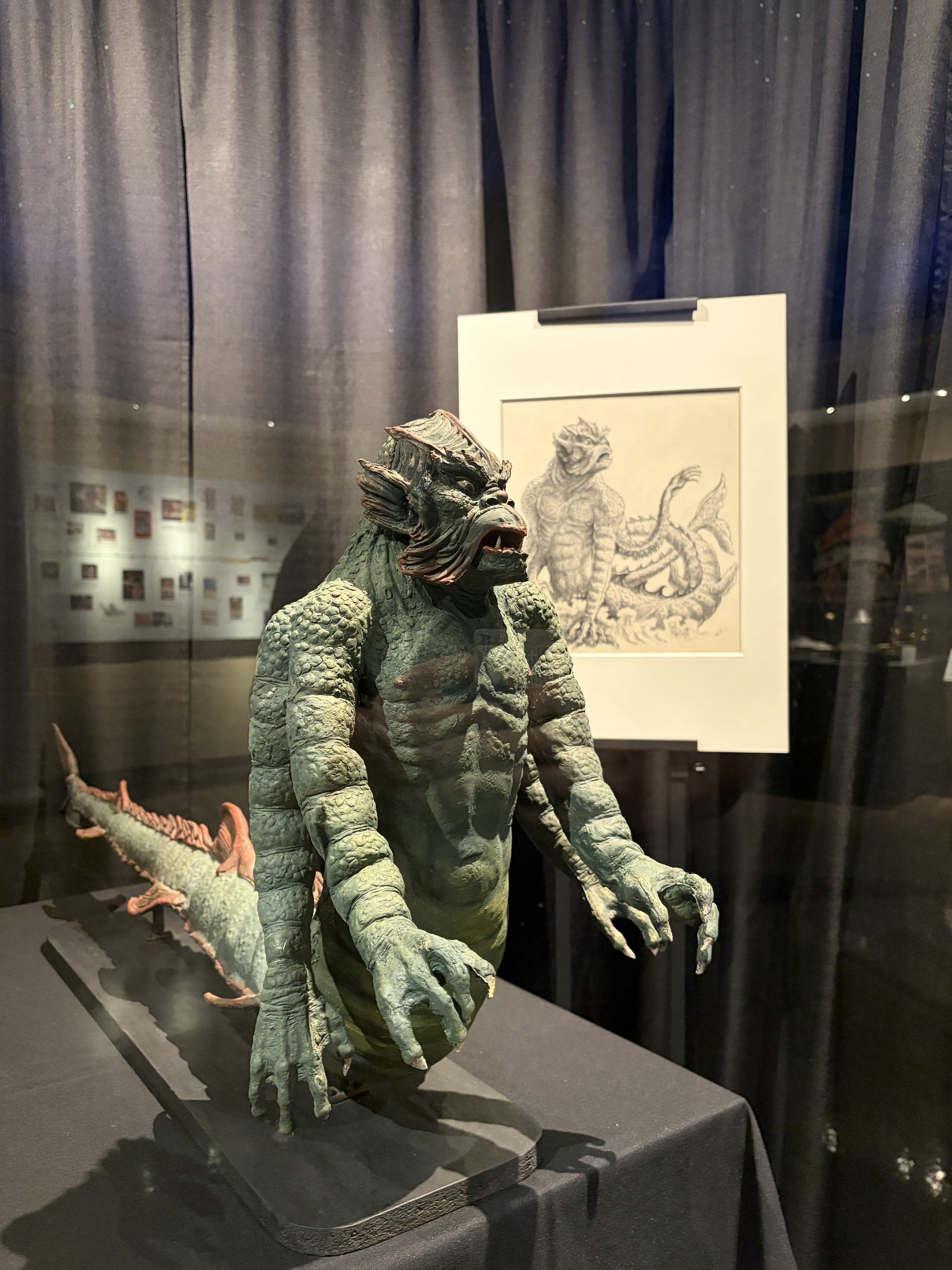
Harryhausen's model of the kraken from Clash of the Titans (1981)

- The Beast from 20,000 Fathoms (1953)
- It Came from Beneath the Sea (1955)
- Earth vs. the Flying Saucers (1956)
- The Animal World (Opening Dinosaur sequence, with O'Brien, 1956)
- 20 Million Miles to Earth (1957)
- The 7th Voyage of Sinbad (1958)
- The 3 Worlds of Gulliver (1960)
- Mysterious Island (1961)
- Jason and the Argonauts (1963)
- First Men in the Moon (1964)
- One Million Years B.C. (1967)
- The Valley of Gwangi (1969)
- The Golden Voyage of Sinbad (1973)
- Sinbad and the Eye of the Tiger (1977)
- Clash of the Titans (with Jim Danforth, 1981)

The third generation of model animators featured such notables as Jim Danforth, David W. Allen, and Phil Tippett.

In the 1980s model animation begin to be used in more specific scenes in notable films such as:

- The Empire Strikes Back (1980)
- The Terminator (1984)
- Beetlejuice (1988)
- Army of Darkness (1992)

Model animation was also used in a cut scene from The Thing (1982 film)

== Awards and Economic Impact ==
=== Major Awards ===
Year	Award	Recipient / film	Notes
1950	Academy Award for Special Effects	Mighty Joe Young (Willis O'Brien)	First Oscar for a model-animation feature
1981	Special Achievement Academy Award (visual effects)	The Empire Strikes Back	Given by the Academy's Board of Governors; the film's effects included the stop-motion AT-AT walkers
1982	Academy Award nomination, visual effects	Dragonslayer (Phil Tippett et al.)	Tippett's first nomination, for go-motion dragon animation
1984	Special Achievement Academy Award (visual effects)	Return of the Jedi (Tippett et al.)	Tippett's first Oscar
1986	Primetime Emmy Award, special visual effects	Dinosaur! (CBS documentary)	Animated dinosaur sequences by Tippett
1992	Gordon E. Sawyer Award (honorary Oscar)	Ray Harryhausen	For technological contributions that "brought credit to the industry"
1994	Academy Award for Best Visual Effects	Jurassic Park (Tippett, Muren, Winston, Lantieri)	Tippett's second Oscar, for the shift from go motion to CGI

=== Impact on the film economy ===
Model animation has repeatedly shaped the finances of the studios that used it. King Kong is credited with saving RKO from bankruptcy during the Great Depression, and Fortune later listed it among films that broke attendance records during economic downturns. By contrast, the effects-heavy Mighty Joe Young won an Oscar but lost money, showing the cost risk of the technique's slow, labour-intensive production.

The Harryhausen–Schneer films demonstrated that a small effects team could carry a commercially successful franchise. Clash of the Titans was one of the top-grossing films of 1981, earning a reported $70 million worldwide according to an MGM press release.

Model animation was also chosen as a cost-saving alternative within larger productions. For the AT-AT walkers in The Empire Strikes Back, the team originally considered building working robots, but that approach proved too expensive and complicated, so stop motion was used instead.

The arrival of CGI with Jurassic Park (1993) shifted effects budgets and labour from physical model shops toward digital studios. Tippett described the change as a turning point for stop-motion artists, many of whom retrained in computer animation.

== See also ==
- List of stop-motion films
- Go motion

== Works cited ==
- Harryhausen, Ray; Dalton, Tony (2008). A Century of Model Animation: From Méliès to Aardman. Aurum Press. ISBN 978-0-8230-9980-1.
- Priebe, Ken A. (2006). The Art of Stop-Motion Animation. Thompson Course Technology. ISBN 1-59863-244-2.
