= Mysterious Island (1961 film) =

1961 film by Ray Harryhausen, Cy Endfield

- Theatrical release poster
- Directed by: Cy Endfield
- Screenplay by: John Prebble; Daniel B. Ullman; Crane Wilbur
- Based on: L'Île mystérieuse 1874 novel by Jules Verne
- Produced by: Charles H. Schneer
- Starring: Michael Craig; Joan Greenwood; Herbert Lom; Michael Callan; Gary Merrill; Dan Jackson
- Cinematography: Wilkie Cooper
- Edited by: Frederick Wilson
- Music by: Bernard Herrmann
- Production company: Ameran Films
- Distributed by: Columbia Pictures
- Release date: December 20, 1961 (U.S.)
- Running time: 101 minutes
- Countries: United States; United Kingdom
- Language: English
- Box office: ~$5,000,000

Mysterious Island (UK: Jules Verne's Mysterious Island) is a 1961 science fiction adventure film about prisoners in the American Civil War who escape in a balloon and then find themselves stranded on a remote island populated by giant animals.

Loosely based upon the 1874 novel The Mysterious Island (L'Île mystérieuse) by Jules Verne (which was the sequel to two other novels by Verne, 1867's In Search of the Castaways and 1870's Twenty Thousand Leagues Under the Seas), the film was produced by Charles H. Schneer and directed by Cy Endfield.

Shot in Catalonia, Spain, and at Shepperton Studios, Shepperton, England, the film serves as a showcase for Ray Harryhausen's stop motion animation effects. Like several of Harryhausen's classic productions, the musical score was composed by Bernard Herrmann.

== Plot ==
During the American Civil War, Union soldiers Cyrus Harding, Herbert Brown, and Neb Nugent, along with war correspondent Gideon Spillet, escape Libby Military Prison in Richmond, Virginia. They abscond with a gas balloon and a Rebel guard, Pencroft, who can pilot it. The balloon carries them west over the Pacific Ocean, where a storm forces them to crash land on an unknown island of tropical jungles, harsh plains, and active volcanoes. While exploring it, the men are attacked by a giant crab which seizes Neb. The others save him, working together to push the beast into a boiling geyser, and have crab for dinner. Afterwards, they find two unconscious English ladies, Lady Mary Fairchild and her niece Elena, shipwrecked by the same storm. Eventually, the castaways make home in a cave formerly inhabited by another castaway. Later, a chest washes ashore. It contains rifles, nautical charts, and a copy of Robinson Crusoe. Markings on the rifles indicate it came from the submarine Nautilus.

Spillet tells Lady Fairchild of the Nautilus, its creator Captain Nemo, and its supposed destruction off Mexico eight years earlier. Using one of the charts, the castaways plot their location and begin constructing a boat. One day, Mary, Elena, and Spillet encounter a giant flightless bird. As it tries to eat Elena, Herbert arrives and knifes the creature. Later, as they consume the bird, they discover it was actually killed by a bullet none of them had fired. Weeks later, Herbert and Elena come across a hive of giant bees. They escape into a large flooded cave, where they spot the Nautilus. They enter the vessel to investigate before swimming out of the cave. Meantime, the others spy an approaching pirate ship, and a fight ensues. The castaways prevail only after an explosion mysteriously sinks the ship with all hands aboard.

The castaways finally meet Captain Nemo, who has been watching the castaways, secretly assisting them by sending the chest, shooting the giant bird, and sinking the pirate ship. He invites them to dinner aboard the Nautilus. There, they find the giant creatures are results of Nemo's genetic experiments to enlarge the world's food resources, eliminating hunger. Further, he has selected the castaways to make his achievements known to the world. One of them is an air-filled raising system which can refloat the pirate ship, the only readily seaworthy vessel on the island. Nemo teaches them to breathe underwater using his "shell" air tanks, and they raise the ship despite interference from a giant Ammonite. But as the castaways set sail, the island's central volcano erupts, killing Nemo and destroying the Nautilus. The rest begin the journey home, vowing to continue Nemo's dream of achieving lasting peace throughout the world.

== Cast ==
- Michael Craig as Captain Cyrus Harding
- Joan Greenwood as Lady Mary Fairchild
- Michael Callan as Herbert Brown
- Gary Merrill as Gideon Spilitt
- Herbert Lom as Captain Nemo
- Beth Rogan as Elena Fairchild
- Percy Herbert as Sergeant Pencroft
- Dan Jackson as Corporal Neb Nugent
- Christian Nouveau as Michael Prince

== Production ==
=== Development ===
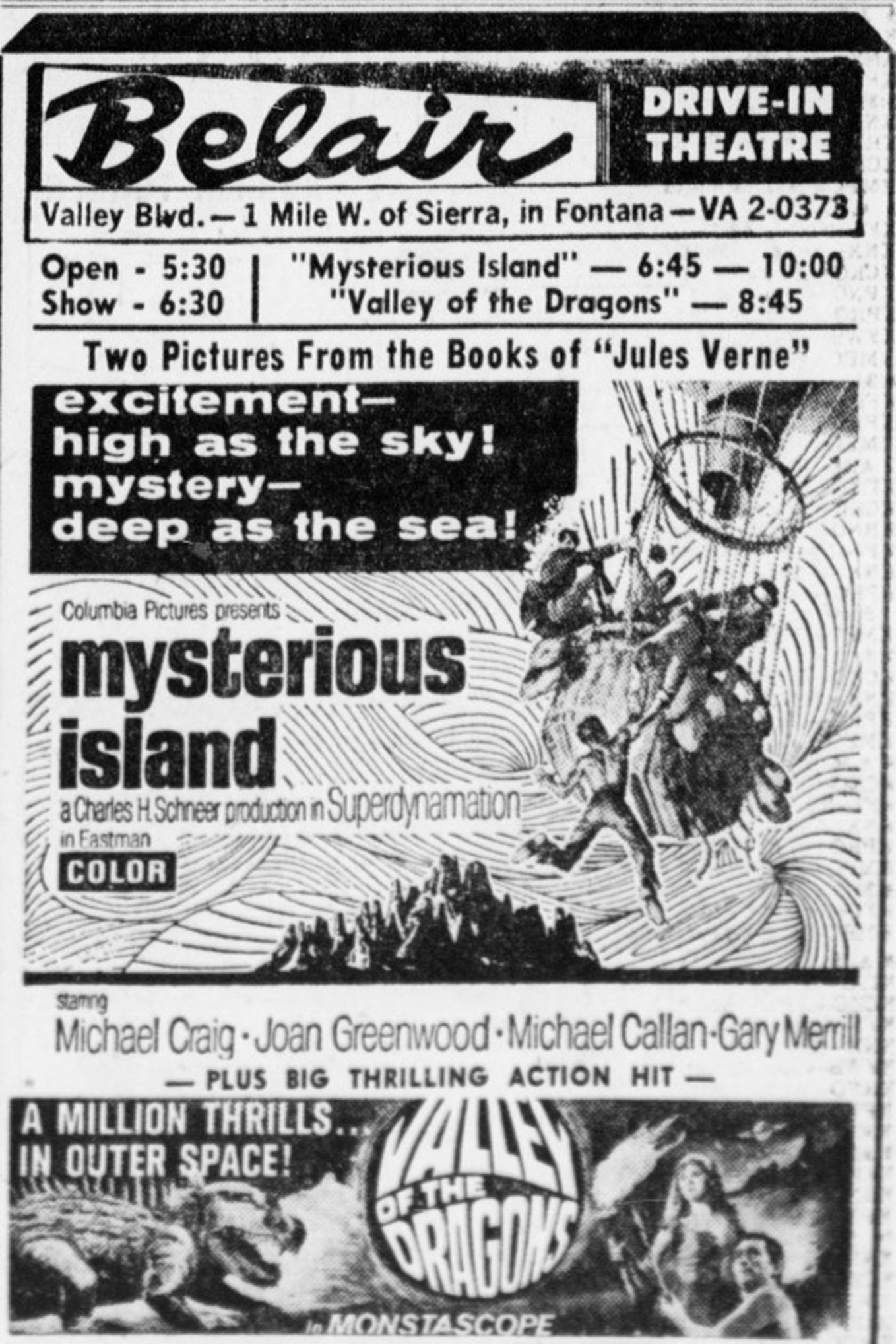
Drive-in advertisement from 1961 for Mysterious Island and co-feature, Valley of the Dragons.

In May 1959, Columbia announced it had signed a deal with Charles Schneer to distribute nine of his films over three years. The films would include Battle of the Coral Sea, Gulliver's Travels, The Werner Von Braun Story, Mystery Island, Gentleman of China, and Air Force Academy.

Mysterious Island would be the sixth collaboration between Schneer and Ray Harryhausen, beginning with It Came From Beneath the Sea, and the third in color, following The 7th Voyage of Sinbad and The 3 Worlds of Gulliver. Like Sinbad and Gulliver, it would be shot in Spain.

=== Screenplay ===
The novel on which the film is based is a sequel to two other novels by Jules Verne, In Search of the Castaways (1867) and Twenty Thousand Leagues Under the Seas (1870). The first book featured the island, the pirates and a character Tom Ayrton who was marooned on a nearby island. The second book featured Captain Nemo and the Nautilus presumed lost in the maelstrom at the end of that novel.

In The Mysterious Island (1874) after the escapees' balloon landed on the island, among many adventures, they encountered Ayrton alive, fought the pirates and discovered that Captain Nemo was their benefactor and the island the base for the Nautilus.

=== Casting ===
The film was mostly cast with British actors. Michael Craig was under contract to Rank. Michael Callan was under contract to Columbia at the time. Percy Herbert was originally rejected for his role due to his British accent, but got the part after practising a southern accent by watching Suddenly Last Summer several times.

=== Filming ===
Filming started 21 June 1960. The beach scenes in Mysterious Island were shot on location at Sa Conca Bay, Castell-Platja d'Aro in Catalonia, Spain. The escape from the Confederate prison - using an observation balloon - was filmed in Church Square, Shepperton, England.

Interiors were completed at Shepperton Studios.

The stop motion animation effects were created by Ray Harryhausen. All the model creatures except the giant bird (which was re-purposed for use as the Ornithomimus in The Valley of Gwangi in 1969) still exist.

Michael Craig called Endfield "a dismal arsehole of an ex-pat American" and Schneer "a real Hollywood suit... the epitome of 'the son in law also rises".

=== Soundtrack ===
The film's music was composed by Bernard Herrmann who had already scored two previous Harryhausen and Schneer productions (The 7th Voyage of Sinbad and The 3 Worlds of Gulliver). The score was performed by the London Symphony Orchestra.

== Critical reception ==
In their review, The New York Times noted "the impressive white-haired person of Herbert Lom," "Cy Endfield's spirited direction," and that Joan Greenwood "gurgles and croaks in a pleasantly distracting style"; and in 1978, their TV critic called the film a "Dandy fantasy-adventure, done with skill and imagination, keyed by fine Bernard Herrmann score. A pip of this kind." Time Magazine said, "It should thrill the geewillikers out of anyone!" The film's rentals brought in $5 million worldwide.

Review aggregator Rotten Tomatoes gives the film an 81% "Fresh" score with an average rating of 6.4/10, based on 16 reviews.

== Home media ==
Blu-ray

ALL America - Twilight Time - The Limited Edition Series

- Picture Format: 1.66:1 (1080p 24fps) [AVC MPEG-4]
- Soundtrack(s): English DTS-HD Master Audio 5.1 and 2.0
- Subtitles: English
- Extras:
- Isolated Score (presented in 2.0 Stereo)
- Original Theatrical Trailer (2:31)
- TV Trailer Spot #1 (1:03)
- Case type: Keep Case
- Note: Limited as in only 3,000 copies were made (none are numbered)

DVD

R1 America - Columbia/Tri-star Home Entertainment

- Picture Format: 1.78:1 (Anamorphic) [NTSC]
- Soundtrack(s): English Dolby Digital 2.0 mono
- Subtitles: English, French, and Spanish
- Extras:
- "The Making Of Mysterious Island" featurette
- "The Harryhausen Chronicles" featurette
- "This Is Dynamation" featurette
- Photo Gallery
- Theatrical Trailer
- Bonus trailers for The Golden Voyage of Sinbad and Sinbad and the Eye of the Tiger
- Case type: Keep Case
- Notes: Also available in The Fantastic Films of Ray Harryhausen: Legendary Science Fiction Series 5-disc box set, with Earth vs. the Flying Saucers, 20 Million Miles to Earth, It Came from Beneath the Sea, and H.G. Wells' First Men in the Moon.

LaserDisc

Columbia Tri-Star Video

- Picture Format: 1.33:1
- Soundtrack: English
- UPC: 043396767461
- ISBN 0-8001-3804-X
- Extras:
  - Ray Harryhausen on the making of the film
  - Posters, lobby cards

Pioneer Special Edition

- Picture Format: 1.33:1
- Soundtrack: English
- UPC: 13023 26225
- Extras:
  - Premiere digital stereo soundtrack restoration
  - CAV presentation
  - Film score isolated on second audio channel
  - Trailer for The 7th Voyage of Sinbad
  - The Making of The 7th Voyage of Sinbad (This is Dynamation! vintage featurette)

== See also ==
- List of stop-motion films
