= Ray Harryhausen: Titan of Cinema =

2020 non-fiction book by Vanessa Harryhausen

- Author: Vanessa Harryhausen
- Language: English
- Genre: Biography, Fantasy film
- Publisher: National Galleries of Scotland
- Publication date: October 26th 2020
- Publication place: United Kingdom
- Media type: Print (Paperback)
- Pages: 208 (First edition, paperback)
- ISBN: 1911054341 (First edition, paperback)

Ray Harryhausen: Titan of Cinema is a book by Vanessa Harryhausen. Daughter of stop motion animator Ray Harryhausen, the book was written to mark her father's centenary in 2020, examining his life and films through 100 personally selected objects from his archive.

== Author ==
Vanessa Harryhausen is a trustee of the Ray and Diana Harryhausen Foundation, which cares her father's 50,000 item strong archive. Outside of the Foundation, Vanessa is a member of the Scottish Castles Association, is a keen Western horse rider, and has a strong personal interest in Scottish history and Native American culture. She has an ongoing involvement with the David Livingstone Centre in Blantyre, as a direct descendant of the explorer on her mother's side; in 2003, a statue designed by her father was unveiled at the centre.

== Overview ==
The book acts as a biography of Ray Harryhausen from the perspective of his only child, who grew up amongst her father's creations and films. Having been present on the set of all of his movies from One Million Years B.C. in 1966 until Clash of the Titans in 1981, Vanessa shares her memories of being raised by such a noted filmmaker.

The publication contains 100 objects which relate to her father's entire life, including his first ever experiments in building models. In an interview for the BBC iPlayer feature "Culture in Quarantine", Vanessa recalls that her father was reluctant to share these early models due to their rudimentary nature. However, she felt it important to show her father's very earliest works to inspire and encourage young filmmakers.

In an interview with Robbie Collin of the Daily Telegraph, Vanessa recalled watching her father create sketches for his films at home, occasionally being asked to select doll's eyeballs for his models in progress. The book also sheds light on Harryhausen's fine art influences, as Vanessa describes the inspiration he took from 19th century artists Gustav Doré, John Martin and Joseph Gandy.

The book contains contributions from many of her father's notable friends, including John Landis, Rick Baker, Phil Tippett, Jim Danforth, Randall William Cook and Harryhausen: The Lost Movies author John Walsh, who is a fellow trustee of the Foundation.

== Publication ==
The book was published in October 2020 by National Galleries of Scotland Publishing, released in parallel with the launch of an exhibition of the same name.

== Critical reception ==
Down the Tubes described the book as "an exhaustive and comprehensive tome with plenty of details and photos covering Ray's entire life and career... highly recommended". Skwigly animation magazine noted that "Vanessa's personal stories and connections give the reader a welcoming sense that behind the much coveted genius was a devoted husband and loving father as well as a much admired colleague". Sci-Fi Bulletin said that the book acted as 'a lush bestiary of Dynamation's fantastic beasts... and here's your guide book, complete with personal photos and anecdotes that are as animated as the monsters on screen'.

The book was given a five-star review by Starburst Magazine, who stated that "...for fans of Ray's work, this is an indispensable book. For those new to stop-motion animation, or those wanting to have more of an insight into what made Ray and his creations so special, it's perfect".

The book was voted as 'Book of the Year' in the 2021 Rondo Hatton Classic Horror Awards. It was also shortlisted for the Saltire Society 'First Book of the Year' in Scotland's National Book Awards 2021.
