= Alec Mango =

English actor (1911–1989)

- in His Excellency (1952)
- Born: Alexander Anthony J. Mango; 16 March 1911; Paddington, London, UK
- Died: 7 November 1989 (aged 78); Westminster, London, UK
- Years active: 1939–1986

Alec Mango (16 March 1911 – 7 November 1989) was an English actor,.

== Career ==
Best known for portraying El Supremo in the 1951 Captain Horatio Hornblower, Mango appeared in South of Algiers (1953), The Strange World of Planet X (1958), The 7th Voyage of Sinbad (1958), Danger Man (1961), and Frankenstein Created Woman (1967).

He also appeared in the television shows, The Adventures of Robin Hood and Strangers and Brothers. One of his last TV appearances was Channel 4's TV movie The Gourmet as Rossi on 4th of January 1987.

== Partial filmography ==
- Fiddlers Three (1944) − Secretary (uncredited)
- Snowbound (1948) − Italian Girl's Boyfriend (uncredited)
- Captain Horatio Hornblower (1951) − El Supremo
- His Excellency (1952) − Jackie
- South of Algiers (1953) − Mahmoud
- They Who Dare (1954) − Patroklis
- Up to His Neck (1954) − Bandit General
- Mask of Dust (1954) − Guido Rosetti
- Lust for Life (1956) − Dr. Rey (uncredited)
- Zarak (1956) − Akbar (merchant)
- Interpol (1957) − Salko
- The Shiralee (1957) − Papadoulos
- The Strange World of Planet X (1958) − Dr. Laird
- The Man Inside (1958) − Lopez
- The 7th Voyage of Sinbad (1958) − Caliph
- The Angry Hills (1959) − Phillibos
- The 3 Worlds of Gulliver (1960) − Minister of Lilliput
- A Story of David (1961) − Kudruh
- We Shall See, (Edgar Wallace Mysteries) (1964) − Ludo
- Khartoum (1966) − Bordeini Bey (uncredited)
- Frankenstein Created Woman (1967) − Spokesman
- Some May Live (1967) − Ducrai
- Steptoe and Son (1972) − Hotel Doctor
- The Playbirds (1978) − Ransome
- Confessions from the David Galaxy Affair (1979) − Pembleton
- Lion of the Desert (1980)
- Gothic (1986) − Murray (final film role)
