= Ray Harryhausen =

American-British animator (1920–2013)

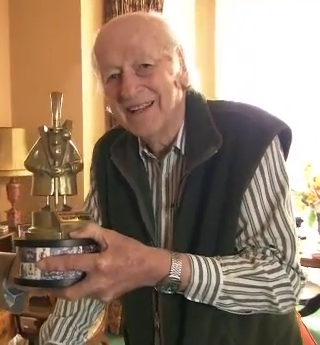
- Harryhausen receiving a Lifetime Achievement Award in 2010
- Born: Raymond Frederick Harryhausen; June 29, 1920; Los Angeles, California, U.S.
- Died: May 7, 2013 (aged 92); London, England
- Education: University of Southern California; Los Angeles City College
- Occupation: Stop motion model animator
- Years active: 1939–2010
- Spouse: Diana Livingstone Bruce (m. 1962)
- Children: 1
- Website: rayharryhausen.com

Signature
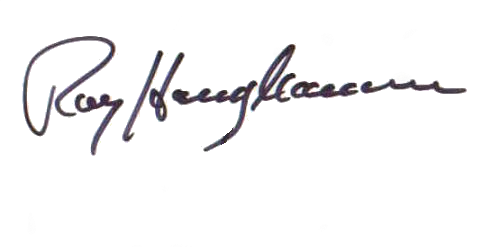

Raymond Frederick Harryhausen (June 29, 1920 – May 7, 2013) was an American-British animator and special effects creator who is regarded as one of the most influential figures in the history of both fields. In a career spanning more than 40 years, he built upon the techniques of his mentor, Willis H. O'Brien, to develop a form of stop motion model animation known as "Dynamation" and advance the field of cinematic special effects. Though not credited as a writer or director on any of the feature films he worked on, the role he played in shaping those he made during his peak years has led to him being regarded as "cinema's sole visual effects auteur," and the creatures and sequences he animated are considered some of the most iconic in the history of cinema.

Inspired by O'Brien's work on The Lost World (1925) and King Kong (1933), Harryhausen spent his adolescence developing his skills with stop motion, leading to him working under O'Brien on Mighty Joe Young (1949) and The Animal World (1956). He took charge of the animation on The Beast from 20,000 Fathoms (1953) before teaming up with producer Charles H. Schneer, with whom he would make 12 films over 26 years. These include It Came from Beneath the Sea (1955), The 7th Voyage of Sinbad (1958), Jason and the Argonauts (1963), First Men in the Moon (1964), The Valley of Gwangi (1969), The Golden Voyage of Sinbad (1973), Sinbad and the Eye of the Tiger (1977), and Clash of the Titans (1981), after which he retired from feature filmmaking. He also created the special effects for One Million Years B.C. (1966), produced by Hammer Films.

In 1960, Harryhausen moved to the United Kingdom and became a dual American-British citizen. During his life, his innovative style of special effects in films inspired numerous filmmakers, and homages to Harryhausen and his work have appeared in a wide range of media. He spent his retirement giving talks, writing books, and appearing in retrospectives on his work and legacy. In 1986, he and his wife Diana Livingston Bruce founded the Ray & Diana Harryhausen Foundation to preserve his models and archives, which have been the subject of multiple exhibitions around the world. His accolades include the honorary Gordon E. Sawyer Academy Award, an honorary BAFTA, and the Lifetime Achievement Award from the Visual Effects Society. His death in May 2013 was met by widespread tributes from filmmakers, animators, and special effects technicians, with Peter Lord calling him "a one-man industry and a one-man genre."

== Early life ==
Raymond Frederick Harryhausen was born on June 29, 1920, in Los Angeles, California, the son of Martha L. (née Reske) and Frederick W. Harryhausen. Of German descent, the family surname was originally spelled "Herrenhausen".

== Career ==
=== 1930s and 1940s ===
After having seen King Kong (1933) on its initial release for the first of many times, Harryhausen spent his early years experimenting in the production of animated shorts, inspired by the burgeoning science fiction literary genre of the period. The scenes utilising stop-motion animation (or model animation), those featuring creatures on the island or Kong, were the work of pioneer model animator Willis O'Brien. His work in King Kong inspired Harryhausen, and a friend arranged a meeting with O'Brien for him. O'Brien critiqued Harryhausen's early models and urged him to take classes in graphic arts and sculpture to hone his skills. Taking O'Brien's advice, while still at high school, Harryhausen took evening classes in art direction, photography and editing at the newly formed School of Cinematic Arts at the University of Southern California, where he would later serve as a lecturer. Meanwhile, he became friends with an aspiring writer, Ray Bradbury, with similar enthusiasms. Bradbury and Harryhausen joined the Los Angeles chapter of the Science Fiction League (now the Los Angeles Science Fantasy Society), Bradbury in 1937, Harryhausen in 1939, where they met Forrest J Ackerman; and the three became lifelong friends.

After studying art and anatomy at Los Angeles City College, Harryhausen secured his first commercial model-animation job, on George Pal's Puppetoons shorts, based on viewing his first formal demo reel of fighting dinosaurs from a project called Evolution, which was never finished, after Harryhausen saw Disney's Rite of Spring montage in Fantasia.

During World War II, Harryhausen served in the U.S. Army's Special Services Division under Colonel Frank Capra, as a loader, clapper boy, gofer and later camera assistant, whilst working at home animating short films about the use and development of military equipment. During this time, he also worked with composer Dimitri Tiomkin and Ted Geisel ("Dr. Seuss"). Following the war, he salvaged several rolls of discarded 16 mm surplus film from which he made a series of fairy tale-based shorts, which he called his "teething-rings".

In 1947, Harryhausen was hired as an assistant animator (credited as "First technician, Special Effects") on what turned out to be his first major film, Mighty Joe Young (1949).

=== 1950s ===
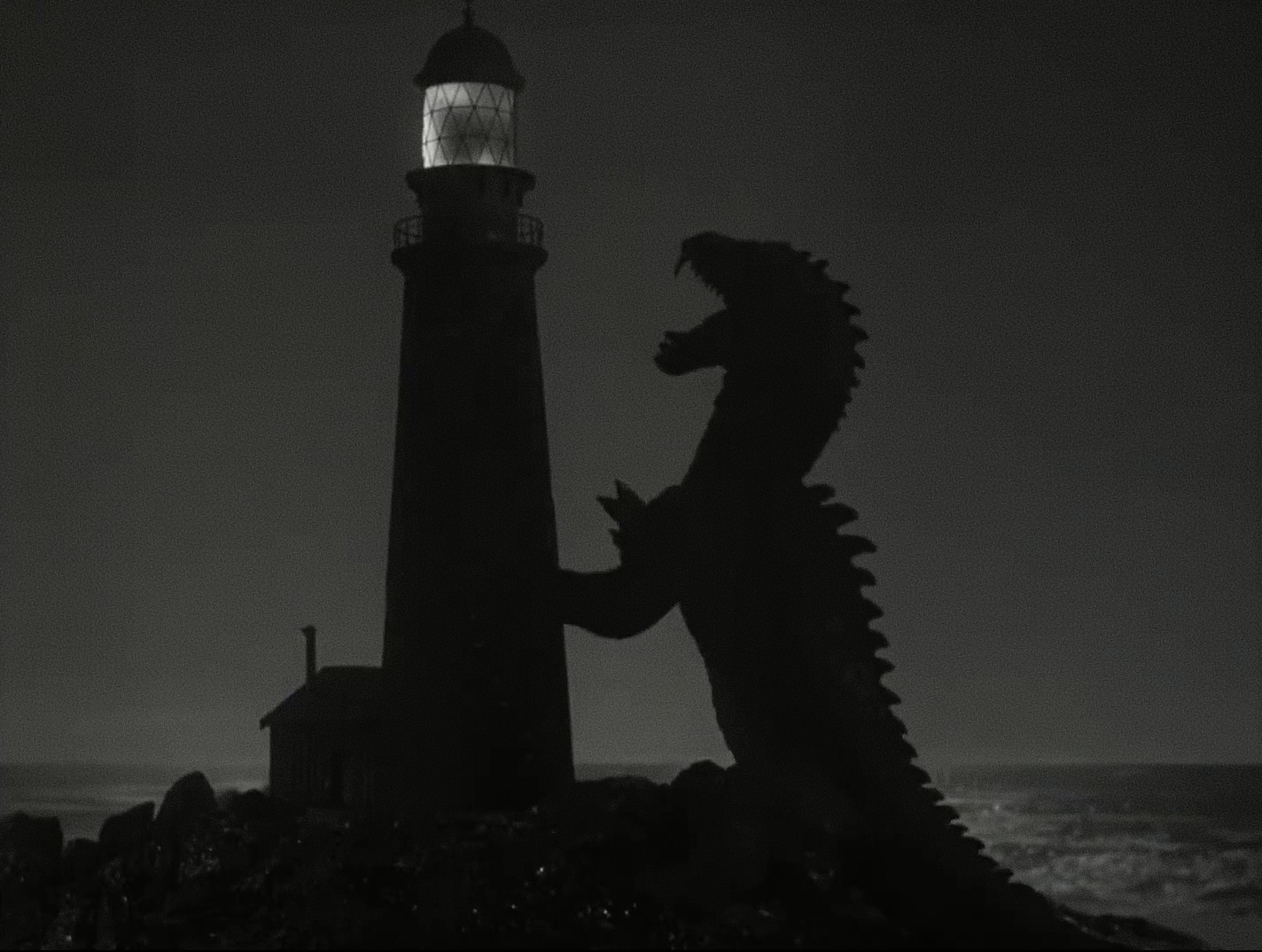
The Rhedosaurus attacks a lighthouse in The Beast from 20,000 Fathoms (1953).

The first film with Ray Harryhausen in full charge of technical effects was the monster horror movie The Beast from 20,000 Fathoms (1953) which began development under the working title Monster From the Sea. The filmmakers learned that a long-time friend of Harryhausen, writer Ray Bradbury, had sold a short story called "The Beast from 20,000 Fathoms" (later re-titled "The Fog Horn") to The Saturday Evening Post, about a dinosaur drawn to a lone lighthouse by its foghorn. Because the story for Harryhausen's film featured a similar scene, the film studio bought the rights to Bradbury's story to avoid any potential legal problems. Also, the title was changed back to The Beast from 20,000 Fathoms. Under that title, it became Harryhausen's first solo feature film effort, and a major international box-office hit for Warner Brothers.

It was on The Beast From 20,000 Fathoms that Harryhausen first used a technique he created called "Dynamation" which split the background and foreground of pre-shot live action footage into two separate images into which he would animate a model or models, seemingly integrating the live-action with the models. The background would be used as a miniature rear-screen with his models animated in front of it, re-photographed with an animation-capable camera to combine those two elements together, the foreground element matted out to leave a black space. Then the film was rewound, and everything except the foreground element matted out so that the foreground element would now photograph in the previously blacked-out area. This created the effect that the animated model was "sandwiched" in between the two live-action elements, right into the final live action scene.

In most of Harryhausen's films, model animated characters interact with, and are a part of, the live action world, with the idea that they will cease to call attention to themselves as only "animation." Most of the effects shots in his earliest films were created via Harryhausen's careful frame-by-frame control of the lighting of both the set and the projector. This dramatically reduced much of degradation common in the use of back-projection or the creation of dupe negatives via the use of an optical printer. Harryhausen's use of diffused glass to soften the sharpness of light on the animated elements allowed the matching of the soft background plates far more successfully than Willis O'Brien had achieved in his early films, allowing Harryhausen to match live and miniature elements seamlessly in most of his shots. By developing and executing most of this miniature work himself, Harryhausen saved money, while maintaining full technical control.

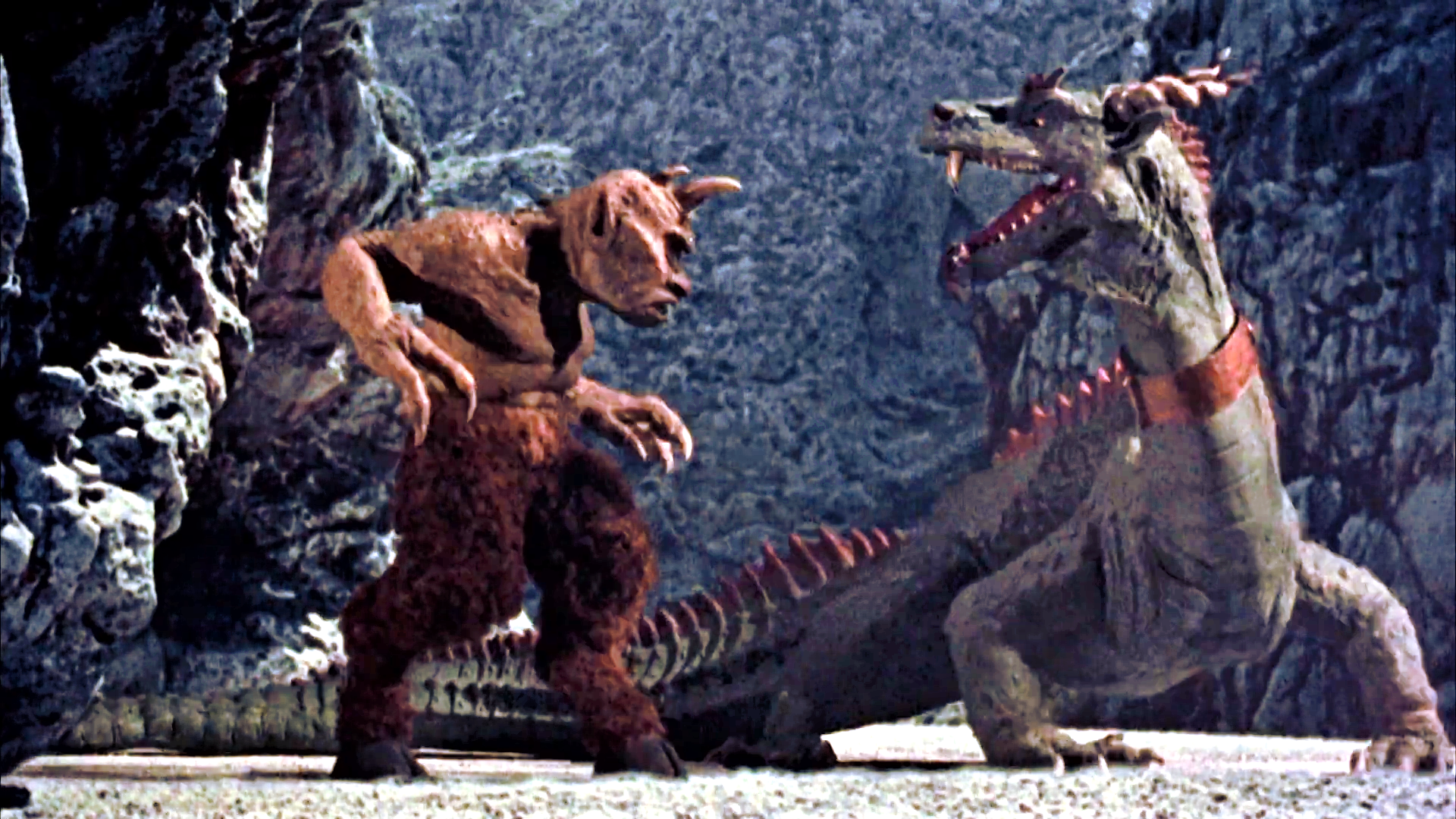
The Cyclops and Dragon battle sequence from The 7th Voyage of Sinbad (1958)

A few years later, when Harryhausen began working with color film to make The 7th Voyage of Sinbad, he experimented extensively with color film stocks to overcome the color-balance-shift problems. Ray's producer/partner Charles H. Schneer coined the word Dynamation as a "merchandising term" (modifying it to "SuperDynaMation" and then "Dynarama" for some subsequent films).

Harryhausen was always heavily involved in the pre-production conceptualizing of each film's story, script development, art-direction, design, storyboards, and general tone of his films, as much as any auteur director would have on any other film, which any "director" of Harryhausen's films had to understand and agree to work under. The complexities of the Directors Guild of America's rules prevented Harryhausen from being credited as the director of his films, resulting in the more modest credits he had in most of his films.

Throughout most of his career, Harryhausen's work was a sort of family affair. His father did the machining of the metal armatures (based on his son's designs) that were the skeletons for the models and allowed them to keep their position, while his mother assisted with some miniature costumes. After Harryhausen's father died in 1973, Harryhausen contracted his armature work out to another machinist. An occasional assistant, George Lofgren, a taxidermist, assisted Harryhausen with the creation of furred creatures. Another associate, Willis Cook, built some of Harryhausen's miniature sets. Other than that, Harryhausen worked generally alone to produce almost all of the animation for his films.

The same year that Beast was released, 1953, fledgling film producer Irwin Allen released a live action documentary about life in the oceans titled The Sea Around Us, which won an Oscar for best documentary feature film of that year. Allen's and Harryhausen's paths would cross three years later, on Allen's sequel to this film.

Harryhausen soon met and began a fruitful partnership with producer Charles H. Schneer, who was working with the Sam Katzman B-picture unit of Columbia Pictures. Their first tandem project was It Came from Beneath the Sea (a.k.a. Monster from Beneath the Sea, 1955), about a giant octopus attacking San Francisco. It was a box-office success, quickly followed by Earth vs. the Flying Saucers (1956), set in Washington D.C. – one of the best of the alien invasion films of the 1950s, and also a box office hit.

In 1954, Irwin Allen had started work on a second feature-length documentary film, this one about animal life on land called The Animal World (completed in 1956). Needing an opening sequence about dinosaurs, Allen hired premier model animator Willis O'Brien to animate the dinosaurs, but then gave him a practically impossibly short production schedule. O'Brien again hired Harryhausen to help with animation to complete the eight-minute sequence. It was Harryhausen's and O'Brien's first and only professional full-color work. (Animal World is available on the DVD release of O'Brien's 1957 film The Black Scorpion.)

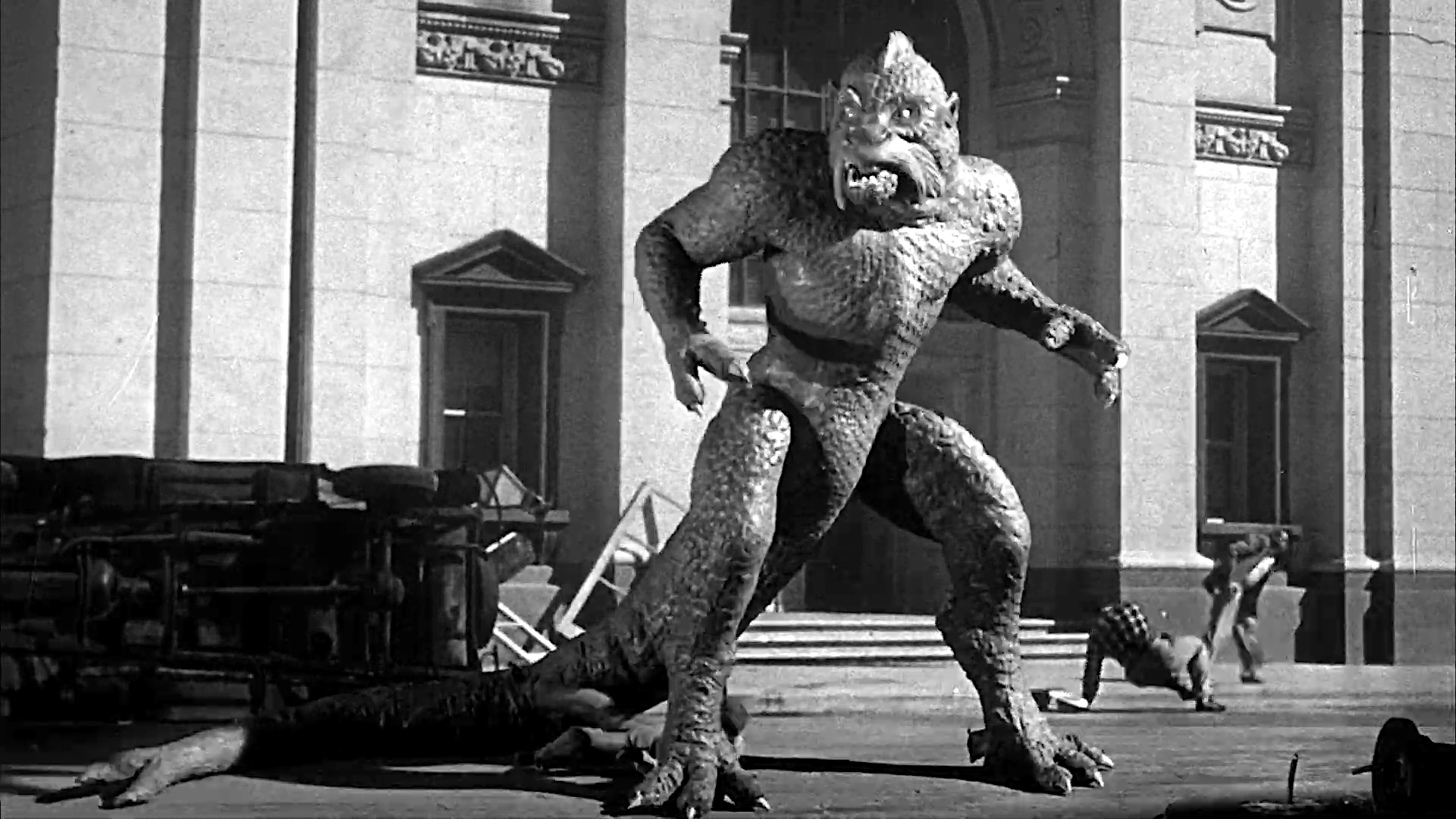
The Ymir from 20 Million Miles to Earth (1957)

Harryhausen then returned to Columbia and Charles Schneer to make 20 Million Miles to Earth (1957), about an American spaceship returning from the planet Venus. The spaceship crashes into the sea near Sicily, releasing an on-board alien egg specimen which washes up on shore. The egg soon hatches a creature that, in Earth's atmosphere, rapidly grows to gigantic size and terrifies the citizens of Rome. Harryhausen refined and improved his already-considerable ability at establishing emotional characterizations in the face of his Venusian Ymir model, creating yet another international box office hit.

Schneer was eager to graduate to full-color films. Reluctant at first, Harryhausen managed to develop the systems necessary to maintain proper color balances for his DynaMation process, resulting in his biggest hit of the 1950s, The 7th Voyage of Sinbad (1958). The top-grossing film of that summer, and one of the top-grossing films of that year, Schneer and Harryhausen signed another deal with Columbia for four more color films.

=== 1960s ===
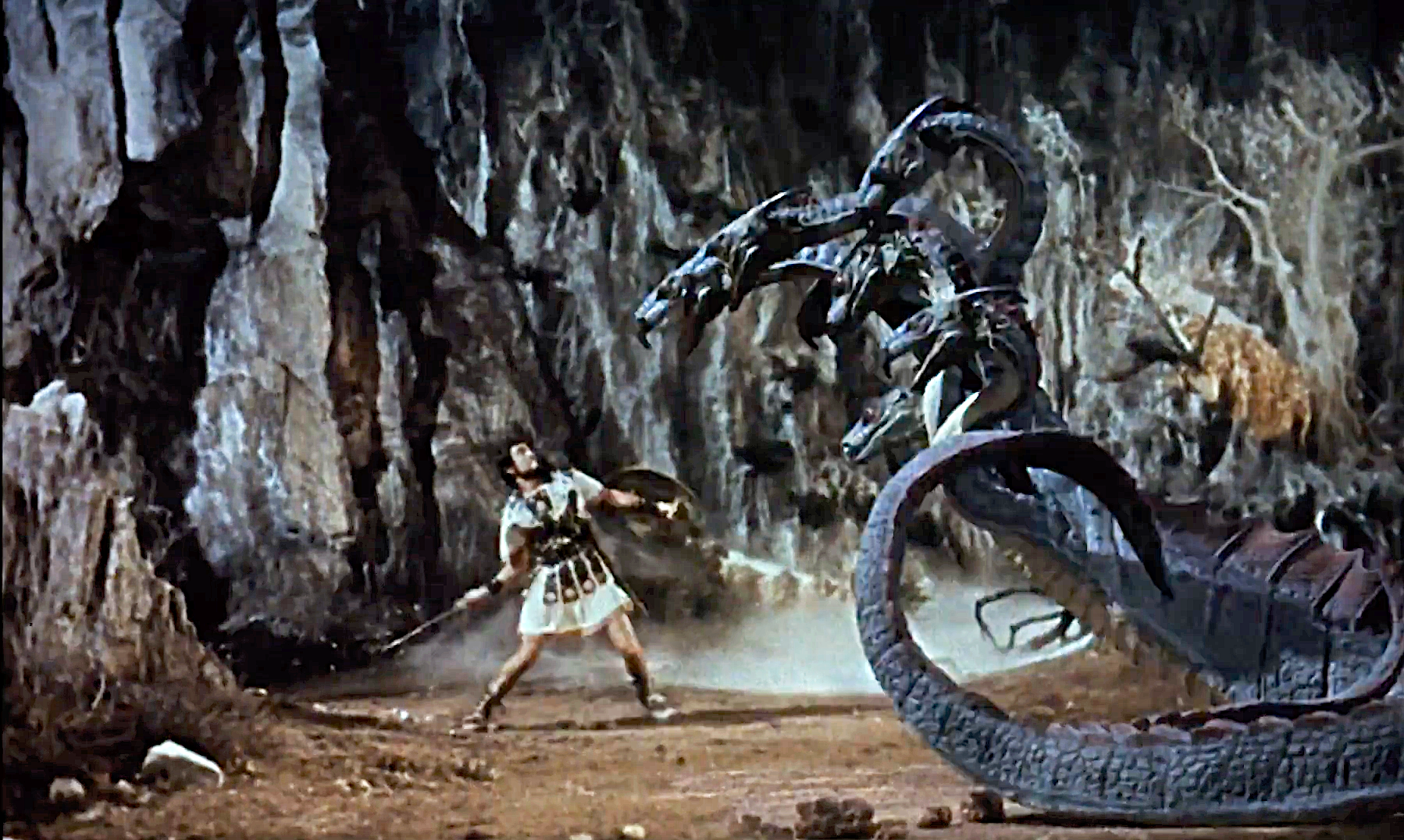
The Hydra battle sequence in Jason and the Argonauts (1963)

After The 3 Worlds of Gulliver (1960) and Mysterious Island (1961), both great artistic and technical successes, and successful at the box office, according to Harryhausen, who stated in the DVD and Blu-ray featurette about the making of Mysterious Island: "Mysterious Island was one of the most successful films that we made and I am glad people are still enjoying it today". And Gulliver "made its profits" as Ray is quoted in Jeff Rovin's bio-book From The Land Beyond Beyond: The Making of the Movie Monsters You've Known and Loved – The Films of Willis O'Brien and Ray Harryhausen. His next film is considered by film historians and fans as Harryhausen's masterwork, Jason and the Argonauts (1963). Among the film's several celebrated animation sequences is an extended fight between three actors and seven living skeletons, a considerable advance on the single-skeleton fight scene in Sinbad. This stop-motion sequence took over four months to complete.

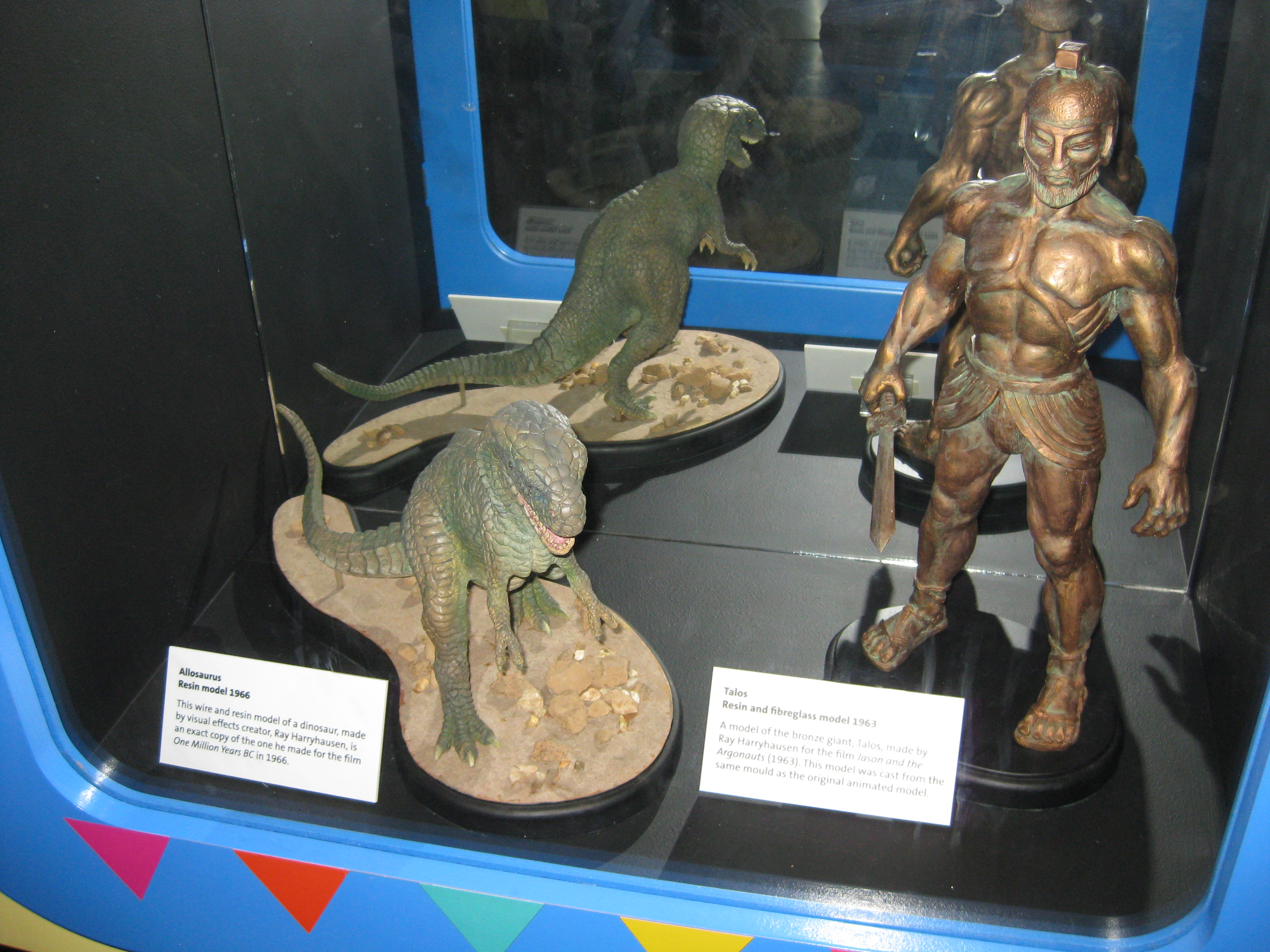
Models for the Allosaur in One Million Years B.C. (1966) and Talos from Jason and the Argonauts (1963) at the National Media Museum

Harryhausen next made First Men in the Moon (1964), his only film made in the 2.35:1 widescreen (a.k.a. "CinemaScope") format, based on the novel by H. G. Wells. Jason and First Men in the Moon were box office disappointments at the time of their original theatrical release. That, plus changes of management at Columbia Pictures, resulted in his contract with Columbia Picture not being renewed. Also, as the 1960s counter-culture came to influence more and more and younger filmmakers, and failing studios struggled to find material that was popular with the new "Boomer-generation" audience, Harryhausen's love of the past, setting his stories in ancient fantasy worlds or previous centuries, kept him from keeping pace with changing tastes in the 1960s. Only a handful of Harryhausen's features have been set in then-present time, and none in the future. As this revolution in the traditional Hollywood film studio system, and the influx of a new generation of film makers sorted itself out, Harryhausen became a free agent.

Harryhausen was then hired by Hammer Films to animate the dinosaurs for One Million Years B.C. (1966). It was a success at the box office, helped in part by the presence of Raquel Welch in her second film. Harryhausen next went on to make another dinosaur film, The Valley of Gwangi with Schneer. The project had been developed for Columbia, who declined. Schneer then made a deal with Warner Brothers instead. It was a personal project to Harryhausen, which he had wanted to do for many years, as it was storyboarded by his original mentor, Willis O'Brien for a 1939 film, Gwangi, that was never completed. Set in Mexico, The Valley of Gwangi is a parallel Kong story—cowboys capture a living Allosaurus and bring him to the nearest Mexican town for exhibition. Sabotage releases the creature, and it wreaks havoc on the town. The film features a roping scene reminiscent of 1949's Mighty Joe Young (which was itself recycled from the old Gwangi storyboards), and a spectacular fire and animation sequence inside a cathedral toward the end of the film, combining multiple special effects.

=== 1970s–1990s ===
After a few lean years, Harryhausen and Schneer talked Columbia Pictures into reviving the Sinbad character, resulting in The Golden Voyage of Sinbad, often remembered for the sword fight involving a statue of the six-armed Hindu goddess Kali. It was first released in Los Angeles in the Christmas season of 1973, but garnered its main audience in the spring and summer of 1974. It was followed by Sinbad and the Eye of the Tiger (1977), which disappointed some fans because of its tongue-in-cheek approach. Both films were, however, box office successes.

Schneer and Harryhausen finally were allowed by MGM to produce a big budget film with name actors and an expanded effects budget. The film started out smaller, but then MGM increased the budget to hire stars such as Laurence Olivier. It became the last feature film to showcase his effects work, Clash of the Titans (1981), for which he was nominated for a Saturn Award for Best Special Effects. For this film, he hired protégé model animators Steve Archer and two-time Oscar-nominated Jim Danforth to assist with major animation sequences. Harryhausen fans will readily discern that the armed-and-finned Kraken (a name borrowed from medieval Scandinavian folklore) he invented for Clash of the Titans has similar facial qualities to the Venusian Ymir he created 25 years earlier for 20 Million Miles to Earth.

Perhaps because of his hermetic production style and the fact that he produced half of his films outside of Hollywood (living in London since 1960), reducing his day-to-day kinship with other more traditional, but still influential Hollywood effects artists, none of Harryhausen's films were nominated for a special effects Oscar. Harryhausen himself says the reason was that he worked in Europe, but this oversight by the AMPAS visual-effects committee also occurred throughout the 1950s when Harryhausen lived in Los Angeles.

In spite of the very successful box office returns of Clash of the Titans, more sophisticated computer-assisted technology developed by ILM and others began to eclipse Harryhausen's production techniques, and so MGM and other studios passed on funding his planned sequel, Force of the Trojans, causing Harryhausen and Schneer to retire from active filmmaking.

In the early 1970s, Harryhausen had also concentrated his efforts on writing a book, Film Fantasy Scrapbook (produced in three editions as his last three films were released), and supervising the restoration and release of (eventually all) his films to VHS, Laserdisc, DVD, and currently Blu-ray. A second book followed, Ray Harryhausen: An Animated Life, written with author and friend Tony Dalton, which details his techniques and history. This was then followed in 2005 by The Art of Ray Harryhausen, featuring sketches and drawings for his many projects, some of them unrealized. In 2008, Harryhausen and Dalton published a history of stop-motion model animation, A Century of Model Animation, and, to celebrate Harryhausen's 90th birthday, the Ray & Diana Harryhausen Foundation published Ray Harryhausen – A Life in Pictures. In 2011, Harryhausen and Dalton's last volume, called Ray Harryhausen's Fantasy Scrapbook, was also published.

Harryhausen continued his lifelong friendship with Ray Bradbury until Bradbury's death in 2012. Another longtime close friend was Famous Monsters of Filmland magazine editor, book writer, and sci-fi collector Forrest J Ackerman, who loaned Harryhausen his photos of King Kong in 1933, right after Harryhausen had seen the film for the first time. Harryhausen also maintained his friendships with his longtime producer, Charles H. Schneer, who lived next door to him in a suburb of London until Schneer moved full-time to the U.S. (a few years later, in early 2009, Schneer died at 88 in Boca Raton, Florida); and with model animation protégé, Jim Danforth, still living in the Los Angeles area.

Harryhausen and Terry Moore appeared in small comedic cameo roles in the 1998 remake of Mighty Joe Young, and he provided the voice of a polar bear cub in the film Elf. He also appears as a bar patron in Beverly Hills Cop III, and as a doctor in the John Landis film Spies Like Us. In 2010, Harryhausen had a brief cameo in Burke & Hare, a British film directed by Landis.

In 1986, Harryhausen formed the Ray & Diana Harryhausen Foundation, a registered charity in the U.K. and U.S. that preserves his collection and promotes the art of stop-motion animation and Harryhausen's contributions to the genre.

=== 2000s–2010s ===
TidalWave Productions' Ray Harryhausen Signature Series produced authorized comic-book adaptions of some of Harryhausen's unrealized projects from 2007 on.

In 2009, he released self-colorized versions on Blu-Ray video of three of his classic black-and-white Columbia films: 20 Million Miles to Earth, Earth vs. the Flying Saucers, and It Came from Beneath the Sea. He also personally supervised the colorization of three films, two of them in partial tribute to their producer Merian C. Cooper, who had supervised King Kong, the film that inspired him as a young man: The Most Dangerous Game (1932), She (1935), and the non-Cooper film Things to Come (1936).

== Personal life ==
Harryhausen married Diana Livingstone Bruce in October 1962. The couple had a daughter, Vanessa.

== Death and legacy ==
The family announced Harryhausen's death on Twitter and Facebook on May 7, 2013, and a representative of the family confirmed his death to the BBC as well as by CBS News and confirmed by his former friend and biographer, Tony Dalton. Diana survived her husband by five months.

Harryhausen was buried in St Peter's Church, Brooke, Norfolk.

The Daily Mirror quoted Harryhausen's website, saying his "influence on today's film makers was enormous, with luminaries; Steven Spielberg, James Cameron, Peter Jackson, George Lucas, John Landis and the U.K.'s own Nick Park have cited Harryhausen as being the man whose work inspired their own creations." Harryhausen drew a distinction between films that combine special effects animation with live action and films that are completely animated, such those of Nick Park, Henry Selick, Ivo Caprino, Ladislav Starevich (and his own fairy tale shorts), which he saw as pure "puppet films", and which are more accurately (and traditionally) called "puppet animation".

The BBC quoted Peter Lord of Aardman Animations, who wrote on Twitter that Harryhausen was "a one-man industry and a one-man genre". The BBC also quoted Shaun of the Dead director Edgar Wright: "I loved every single frame of Ray Harryhausen's work ... He was the man who made me believe in monsters." In a full statement released by the family, George Lucas said, "Without Ray Harryhausen, there would likely have been no Star Wars". Terry Gilliam said, "What we do now digitally with computers, Ray did digitally long before but without computers. Only with his digits." James Cameron said, "I think all of us who are practitioners in the arts of science fiction and fantasy movies now all feel that we're standing on the shoulders of a giant. If not for Ray's contribution to the collective dreamscape, we wouldn't be who we are."

John Walsh, author of Harryhausen: The Lost Movies, calls Harryhausen "the most influential stop-motion animator and special-effects wizard in cinema history."

In November 2016 the BFI compiled a list of those present-day filmmakers who claim to have been inspired by Harryhausen, including Steven Spielberg, Peter Jackson, Joe Dante, Tim Burton, Terry Gilliam, Nick Park, James Cameron, Guillermo del Toro and Christopher Nolan. Others influenced by him include George Lucas, John Lasseter, John Landis, Henry Selick, J. J. Abrams, Wes Anderson, Robert Rodriguez, special effects supervisors Phil Tippett, and Dennis Muren, and video game creator David Jaffe.

== Foundation ==
Harryhausen left his collection, which includes all of his film-related artifacts, to the Ray & Diana Harryhausen Foundation, which he set up in 1986 to look after his extensive collection, to protect his name and to further the art of model stop-motion animation. The trustees are his daughter Vanessa Harryhausen, Simon Mackintosh, actress Caroline Munro, who appeared in The Golden Voyage of Sinbad and film maker John Walsh, who first met Harryhausen in 1988 as a student at the London Film School and made the documentary Ray Harryhausen: Movement Into Life, narrated by Doctor Who actor Tom Baker. The foundation's website charts progress on the restoration of the collection and plans for Harryhausen's legacy.

In 2013, the RH foundation and Arrow Films released a feature-length biography of Harryhausen and his films, Ray Harryhausen – Special Effects Titan, on Blu-Ray. Featuring photos, artifacts, and film clips culled directly from Harryhausen's estate and never before seen by the public, the film was initially released only in the U.K., but was released on Blu-Ray in the U.S. in 2016.

In February 2016, John Walsh and Collections Manager Connor Heaney began a podcast about all things Harryhausen, from the films to the various composers involved on the productions. Occasionally the podcast features interviews with fans, as well as insights into Harryhausen's models from Foundation model conservator Alan Friswell. The podcast has featured Mark Gatiss, John Cairney, Caroline Munro, and Vanessa Harryhausen.

Some of Harryhausen's models and artworks were showcased as part of the Barbican Centre's 'Into the Unknown' exhibition from June 3 to September 1, 2017. To mark his 97th birthday on July 29, 2017, the Barbican posted a guest blog by Heaney, highlighting Harryhausen's lasting influence on science fiction.

On June 5, 2017, it was announced that a major exhibition of Harryhausen's models, "Ray Harryhausen—Mythical Menagerie", would take place at the Science Museum Oklahoma. The exhibition opened on July 29. USA Today called it "one of best museum exhibits in the U.S. this fall". In 2018 the exhibition was nominated for a Rondo Hatton Award for "Best Live Event".

An exhibition at Tate Britain from June 26 to November 19, 2017, features work from the Harryhausen collection and short film made by John Walsh on the restoration of a painting owned by Harryhausen which influenced his work.

In September 2018, Titan Books published Harryhausen – The Movie Posters by author Richard Holliss, focusing on the various movie posters associated with Harryhausen's films from across the globe.

In September 2019, Foundation trustee, Titan Books published a new book by Walsh, Harryhausen: The Lost Movies which delves into the hidden treasures of Ray's unrealised film projects. On 15 September, a book launch and signing event was held at the Forbidden Planet London Megastore, and was followed up with a 4K screening of The 7th Voyage of Sinbad. In a podcast interview with BritFlicks, Walsh discussed his plans to further develop lost Ray Harryhausen film projects, which includes the follow-up to 1981's "Clash of the Titans", entitled "Force of the Trojans".

An exhibition opened showing items from the Harryhausen collection at the Valence House Museum on March 14, 2018. The exhibition was inspired by local man Alan Friswell, who worked with Ray Harryhausen on the creatures' restorations. It was funded by Barking and Dagenham London Borough Council.

In 2026, The Arc in Winchester staged an exhibition titled Ray Harryhausen – Myths in Motion.

== Centenary ==
In July 2018, it was announced that the largest ever exhibition of Harryhausen's models and artwork would take place at the Scottish National Gallery of Modern Art in Edinburgh, to mark the centenary of his birth. The exhibition was planned to run for a year, from October 2020 until September 2021. Ultimately, the exhibition was extended to end in February 2022. The exhibition was the subject of a BBC iPlayer documentary entitled Culture in Quarantine, which featured interviews with Vanessa Harryhausen, Caroline Munro and Martine Beswick, as well as footage from Ray Harryhausen: Movement into Life. Many of Harryhausen's original latex models were repaired for this exhibition: in an interview with the Visual Effects Society, Walsh said that "We're restoring pieces as we go, trying to get things back as close to how people remember them as possible".

It was also announced that Vanessa Harryhausen was writing a book to mark her father's centenary, to accompany the exhibition in Edinburgh. Also entitled Ray Harryhausen: Titan of Cinema, the book looks back on his personal and professional life through Vanessa's 100 favourite objects from his collection, and contains contributions from John Landis, Rick Baker, Phil Tippett, Jim Danforth and others.

In 2021, it was announced that The Ray Harryhausen Award would be launched to celebrate Ray's influence on contemporary filmmakers and animators. The first awards ceremony took place on what would have been Ray's 102nd birthday, in June 2022. The film Mad God won the inaugural award for best feature film, and six other winners were selected across a range of categories.

== The Gordon E. Sawyer Academy Award ==
During the 1980s and early 1990s, Harryhausen's fans who had graduated into the professional film industry started lobbying The Academy of Motion Picture Arts and Sciences to acknowledge Harryhausen's contribution to the film industry, and so, in 1992, the academy finally awarded him the Gordon E. Sawyer Award (effectively a lifetime achievement "Oscar") for "technological contributions [which] have brought credit to the industry", with actor Tom Hanks (as the Master of Ceremonies) and Ray Bradbury (a friend from when they were both just out of high school) presenting the award to him. After the presentation to Harryhausen, actor Tom Hanks told the audience, "Some people say Casablanca or Citizen Kane...I say Jason and the Argonauts is the greatest film ever made!"

== Other awards and honors ==
- The work of Ray Harryhausen was celebrated in an exhibition at London's Museum of the Moving Image (MOMI) in 1990.
- In 2010 the main screening theater at Sony Pictures Digital Productions was named in honor of Harryhausen.
- The Science Fiction Hall of Fame inducted Harryhausen in 2005, the first year it honored non-literary contributors. (Note: After inducting 36 fantasy and science fiction writers and editors from 1996 to 2004, the hall of fame dropped "fantasy" and made non-literary contributors eligible. Alongside one writer, the first three were Harryhausen, illustrator Chesley Bonestell, and filmmaker Steven Spielberg.) He received the annual British Fantasy Society Wagner Award in 2008 for his lifetime contribution to the genre.
- On June 10, 2003, Harryhausen was honored with a star on the Hollywood Walk of Fame.
- In 2005, Harryhausen received a Lifetime Achievement Award from the Amsterdam Fantastic Film Festival.
- Ray received an honorary BAFTA in June 2010 at a ceremony at the British Film Institute. His mask award was presented to him by filmmaker Peter Jackson.
- In 2011, Harryhausen was awarded the Lifetime Achievement Award from the Visual Effects Society. Harryhausen was later inducted into the Visual Effects Society Hall of Fame in 2018.

== Preservation ==
The Academy Film Archive has preserved a number of Ray Harryhausen's films, including Guadalcanal, How to Bridge a Gorge, and The Story of Hansel and Gretel.

== In popular culture ==
Fan and filmmaker tributes to Harryhausen abound in many forms:

- The 2001 Disney/Pixar animated film Monsters, Inc. pays homage to Harryhausen in a scene where James P. "Sulley" Sullivan, Mike Wazowski, Boo, Celia Mae and other monsters visit a Japanese and sushi restaurant named Harryhausen's in Monstropolis.
- In 2007, fantasy comic book author/illustrator Stephen D. Sullivan dedicated his novel Warrior's Bones to Harryhausen and comic book creator Stan Lee. "For stoking the fires of my imagination." In the book, which is part of the Dragonlance: The New Adventures series, the heroine must battle a rampaging clockwork giant.
- "Worried About Ray" is a 2007 song by The Hoosiers that is a tribute to Harryhausen.
- The Gravity Falls episode "Little Gift Shop of Horrors" (specifically the "Clay Day" segment), has several references to Ray Harryhausen and his work.
- The 2013 film Pacific Rim included a dedication to "monster masters Ray Harryhausen and Ishirō Honda".

== Filmography ==
=== Feature films and creatures animated ===
- Mighty Joe Young (1949, First technician)
- The Beast from 20,000 Fathoms (1953, Visual effects)
- It Came from Beneath the Sea (1955, Visual effects)
- The Animal World (1956, Effects technician, documentary)
- Earth vs. the Flying Saucers (1956, Special photographic/animation effects)
- 20 Million Miles to Earth (1957, Visual effects)
- The 7th Voyage of Sinbad (1958, Associate producer, visual effects)
- The 3 Worlds of Gulliver (1960, Visual effects)
- Mysterious Island (1961, Special visual effects)
- Jason and the Argonauts (1963, Associate producer, visual effects)
- First Men in the Moon (1964, Associate producer, visual effects)
- One Million Years B.C. (1966, Special visual effects)
- The Valley of Gwangi (1969, Associate producer, visual effects)
- The Golden Voyage of Sinbad (1973, Producer, visual effects)
- Sinbad and the Eye of the Tiger (1977, Producer, visual effects)
- Clash of the Titans (1981, Producer, visual effects)

=== Short films ===
- How to Bridge a Gorge (also known as How to Build a Bridge) (1942) (producer)
- Tulips Shall Grow (1942) (chief animator) – part of George Pal's Puppetoons
- Guadalcanal (1943) (director, 10 minutes)
- Mother Goose Stories (1946) (producer) (silent with text)
- The Story of Little Red Riding Hood (1949) (producer, animator)
- The Story of Rapunzel (1951) (producer)
- The Story of Hansel and Gretel (1951) (producer)
- The Story of King Midas (1953) (producer)
- The Story of The Tortoise & the Hare (2002) (director, co-producer, animator) (production begun in 1953)

=== Interviews and acting ===
- 20 Million Miles to Earth (1957) – Man Feeding Elephant (uncredited)
- The Fantasy Film World of Ray Harryhausen (1983) – interview (reissued as Aliens, Dragons, Monsters & Me in 1986 and 1990)
- Spies Like Us (1985) – Dr. Marston
- The Fantasy Film Worlds of George Pal (1985) – interview (film produced and directed by Arnold Leibovit)
- Ray Harryhausen: Movement Into Life (1989) – interview made by Ray Harryhausen Foundation Trustee John Walsh
- Beverly Hills Cop III (1994) – Bar Patron #2
- The Harryhausen Chronicles (1997) – interview
- Mighty Joe Young (1998) – Gentleman at Party
- Elf (2003) – Polar Bear Cub (voice)
- Trail of the Screaming Forehead (2007) – himself – presenter
- The Boneyard Collection (2008) – himself (segment "Her Morbid Desires")
- Burke & Hare (2010) – Distinguished Doctor (final film role)
- Ray Harryhausen: Special Effects Titan (2011) – interview
- MENTALLUSIONS: Radical Eclectic Films of Benjamin Meade (2012) – himself

== Unrealized projects ==
- The War of the Worlds (1949): Based on the H.G. Wells novel of the same name, the plot involves Victorian England being invaded by Martians. In later drafts, the Martians invade earth in present-day America. This would later on be made into a movie by Ray's friend George Pal in 1953.
- Skin and Bones (1963): Based on the novel by Thorne Smith, it is a comedic tale about a photographer whose experiments with chemicals lead him to discover a form of invisibility, except for his skeleton.
- The 8th Voyage of Sinbad: Return to Colossa (2007): In an interview with Dalya Alberge for The Guardian, John Walsh said he "was taken aback by the scale of unrealized artwork that reveals new worlds, epic tales and fearsome creatures."
- The People of the Mist, based on the novel by H. Rider Haggard, with Michael Winner as the director.

== See also ==
- Willis H. O'Brien
- Phil Tippett
