= Harryhausen: The Lost Movies =

Book by John Walsh published in 2019

- Author: John Walsh
- Language: English
- Genre: Nonfictdion
- Publisher: Titan Books
- Publication date: September 10, 2019
- Publication place: United Kingdom
- Media type: Print (Hardcover)
- Pages: 192 (First edition, hardcover)
- ISBN: 978-1789091106 (First edition, hardcover)

Harryhausen: The Lost Movies is a book by John Walsh, one of the trustees of the Ray and Diana Harryhausen Foundation (one of the largest animation archives of its kind), published September 10, 2019. This is a guide to unrealised cinema films of Ray Harryhausen from 1940s to the 2000s.

== Overview ==
Animation Magazine's review said “This off-screen side of an incredible career is brought to life with never-before-seen artwork, sketches, photos and test footage from the Foundation’s archives.”

== Recognition ==
Screen Anarchy chose Harryhausen: The Lost Movies as one of their top ten books of 2019. In 2020 the book was nominated as Book for the Year for the Rondo Hatton Classic Horror Awards.

== Publication ==
Published in September 2019 by Titan Books.
