= The 7th Voyage of Sinbad =

1958 film by Nathan Juran

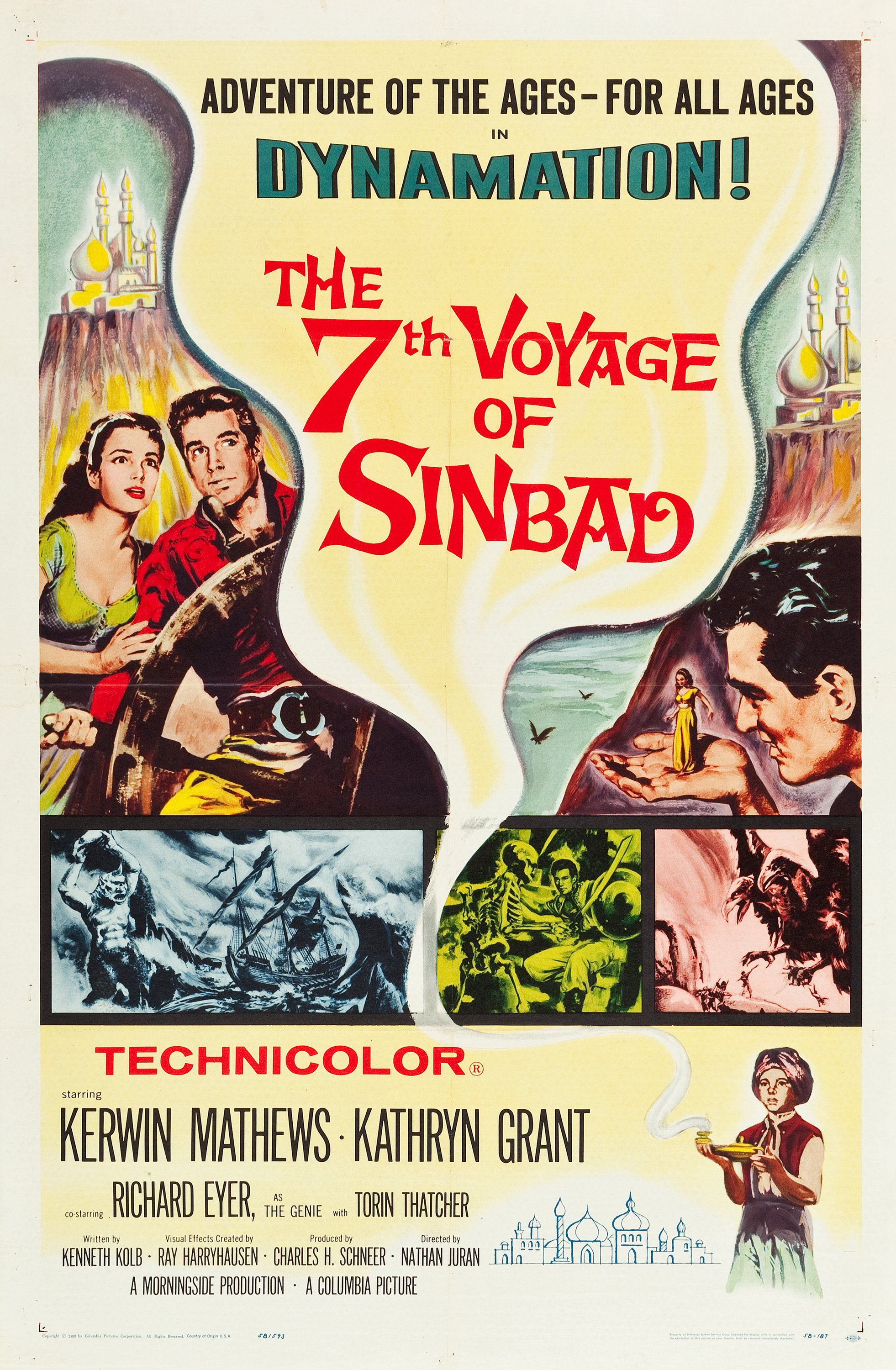
- Theatrical release poster
- Directed by: Nathan Juran
- Written by: Kenneth Kolb
- Based on: Sinbad the Sailor from One Thousand and One Nights
- Produced by: Charles H. Schneer
- Starring: Kerwin Mathews; Kathryn Grant; Richard Eyer; Torin Thatcher
- Cinematography: Wilkie Cooper
- Edited by: Edwin H. Bryant; Jerome Thoms
- Music by: Bernard Herrmann
- Production company: Morningside Productions
- Distributed by: Columbia Pictures
- Release date: December 17, 1958
- Running time: 88 minutes
- Country: United States
- Language: English
- Budget: $650,000
- Box office: $29 million (est.)

The 7th Voyage of Sinbad is a 1958 American fantasy adventure film directed by Nathan Juran and starring Kerwin Mathews, Kathryn Grant, Torin Thatcher, Richard Eyer and Alec Mango. It was distributed by Columbia Pictures and produced by Charles H. Schneer.

It is the first of three Sinbad feature films produced by Schneer and conceptualized by Ray Harryhausen. Its sequels are The Golden Voyage of Sinbad (1973) and Sinbad and the Eye of the Tiger (1977). It was also the first film in which Harryhausen used full color widescreen stop motion animation for the special effects.

While similarly named, the film does not follow the storyline of the tale "The Seventh Voyage of Sinbad the Sailor" but instead has more in common with "The Third Voyage" and "The Fifth Voyage".

In 2008, The 7th Voyage of Sinbad was selected for preservation in the United States National Film Registry by the Library of Congress as being "culturally, historically, or aesthetically significant".

== Plot ==
Sinbad, the heir of the Caliph of Baghdad, lands with his crew on the island of Colossa, where they encounter Sokurah the magician fleeing a giant cyclops. Though he escapes, Sokurah loses to the creature a magic lamp. Sinbad refuses his desperate pleas to return to Colossa because Parisa, Princess of Chandra, is aboard. Their coming marriage is meant to secure peace between her father's sultanate and Baghdad.

In Baghdad, Sokurah performs magic at the pre-wedding festivities, temporarily turning Parisa's handmaiden into a Nāga-like being. Despite Sokurah's prowess and a dark prophecy about war between Baghdad and Chandra, the Caliph refuses to help him return to Colossa. Later that night, Sokurah secretly shrinks the princess, enraging her father, who declares war on Baghdad. Sinbad and the Caliph give in to Sokurah's demands after he explains that the potion to restore Parisia requires a Roc's eggshell, found only on Colossa. Sokurah gives Sinbad plans for a giant crossbow for protection against the island's giant creatures.

Sinbad recruits additional crewmen from among convicts. Before they reach Colossa, the treacherous Karim inspires the cutthroats to mutiny and capture Sokurah, Sinbad, and his men. During a violent storm, keening demons from a nearby island drive the crew nearly mad and endanger the ship. One of the men releases Sinbad so he can save them, after Karim falls to his death from the crow's nest.

On Colossa, Sinbad, Sokurah, and six of his crew enter the cyclops' valley, followed by Sinbad's loyal aide Harufa. Sinbad and Sokurah split up. Sinbad and his men find the cyclops' treasure cave, but it captures and locks them in a wooden cage. Instead of helping them, Sokurah retrieves the magic lamp, but is chased by the cyclops, who kills three of the men. With Parisa's help, Sinbad escapes, then blinds the one-eyed creature and lures it off a cliff edge to its death. Sinbad decides to hold on to the lamp until Parisa is restored to normal size.

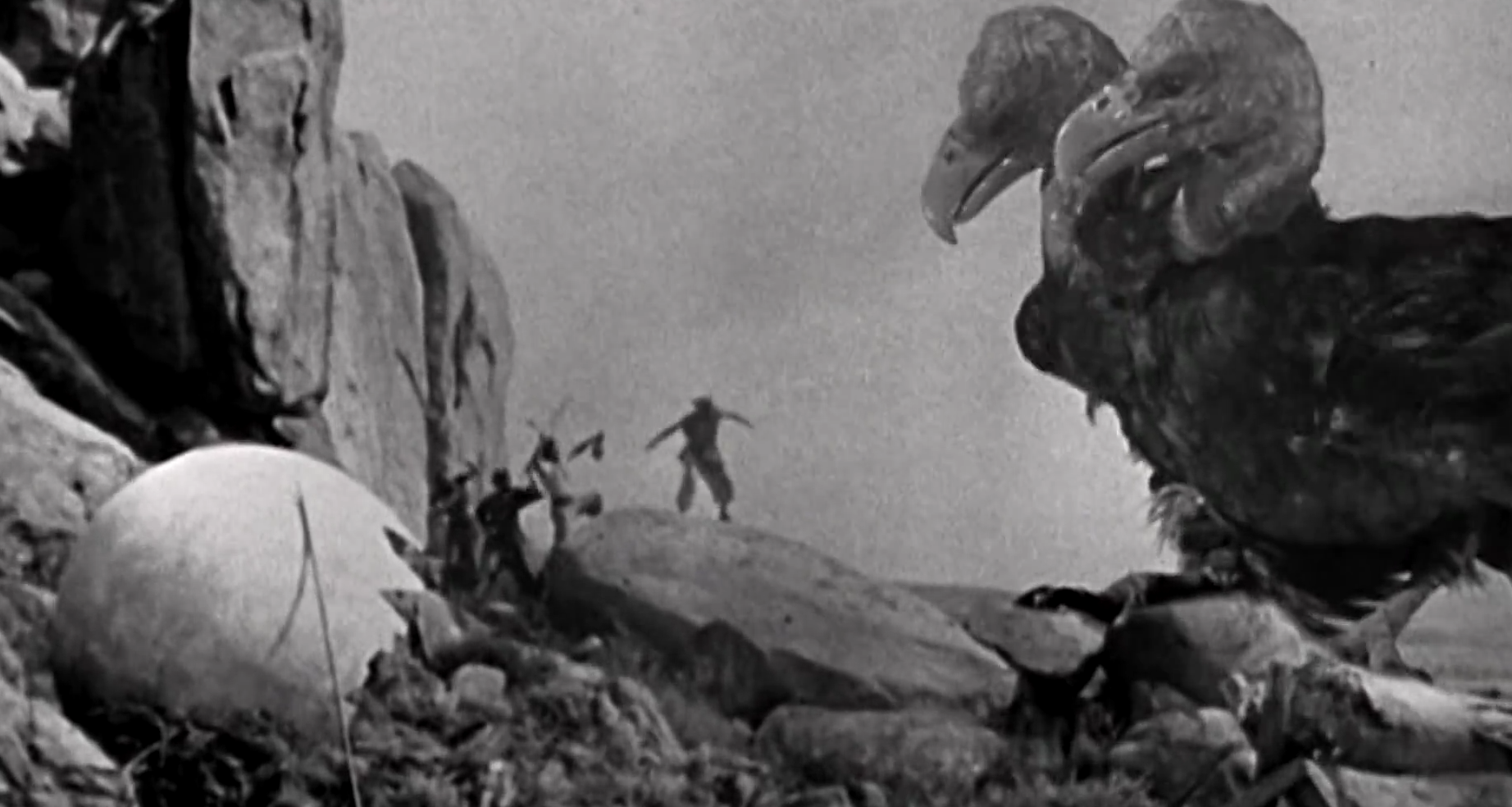
Sinbad and his men confront the Roc.

Sokurah leads Sinbad and his starving men to the nesting place of the giant Rocs. Hungry, Sinbad's men break open a Roc egg and kill the chick for food. Meanwhile, Parisa enters the magic lamp and befriends Barani, the childlike genie inside. He tells her how to summon him in exchange for her promise of freedom. The parent Roc returns and slays the men. Sinbad tries to summon the genie, but the Roc grabs and drops him unconscious into its nearby nest. Sokurah kills Harufa and abducts the princess, taking her to his underground fortress.

Sinbad awakens and rubs the magic lamp, summoning Barani, who takes him to Sokurah's fortress and helps him evade the chained dragon guarding the entrance. Sinbad reaches Sokurah, who restores the princess to her normal size. When Sinbad refuses to hand over the lamp, the magician animates a skeleton warrior, which Sinbad fights and destroys. With the genie's help, Sinbad and Parisa flee the cave, stop to destroy the lamp by throwing it into a pool of lava, and free Barani.

As they leave the cave, they encounter another cyclops; Sinbad releases the dragon, which fights and kills the creature. Sinbad and Parisa make their escape, but Sokurah and the dragon chase Sinbad's crew. The crewmen head to the beach, where they use a giant crossbow to fatally impale the dragon, crushing Sokurah. Sinbad, Parisa, and the remaining crew depart for Baghdad. Barani, now human, joins them and appoints himself Sinbad's cabin boy.

== Cast ==
Original trailer

- Kerwin Mathews as Sinbad
- Kathryn Grant as Princess Parisa
- Richard Eyer as Barani, the Genie
- Torin Thatcher as Sokurah
- Alec Mango as the Caliph of Baghdad
- Harold Kasket as the Sultan, Parisa's father
- Alfred Brown as Harufa, Sinbad's loyal right-hand man
- Nana DeHerrera as Sadi (as Nana de Herrera)
- Nino Falanga as Gaunt Sailor
- Luis Guedes as Crewman
- Virgílio Teixeira as Ali, one of Sinbad's crewmen
- Danny Green as Karim, the leader of the mutineers
- Juan Olaguivel as Golar

== Production ==
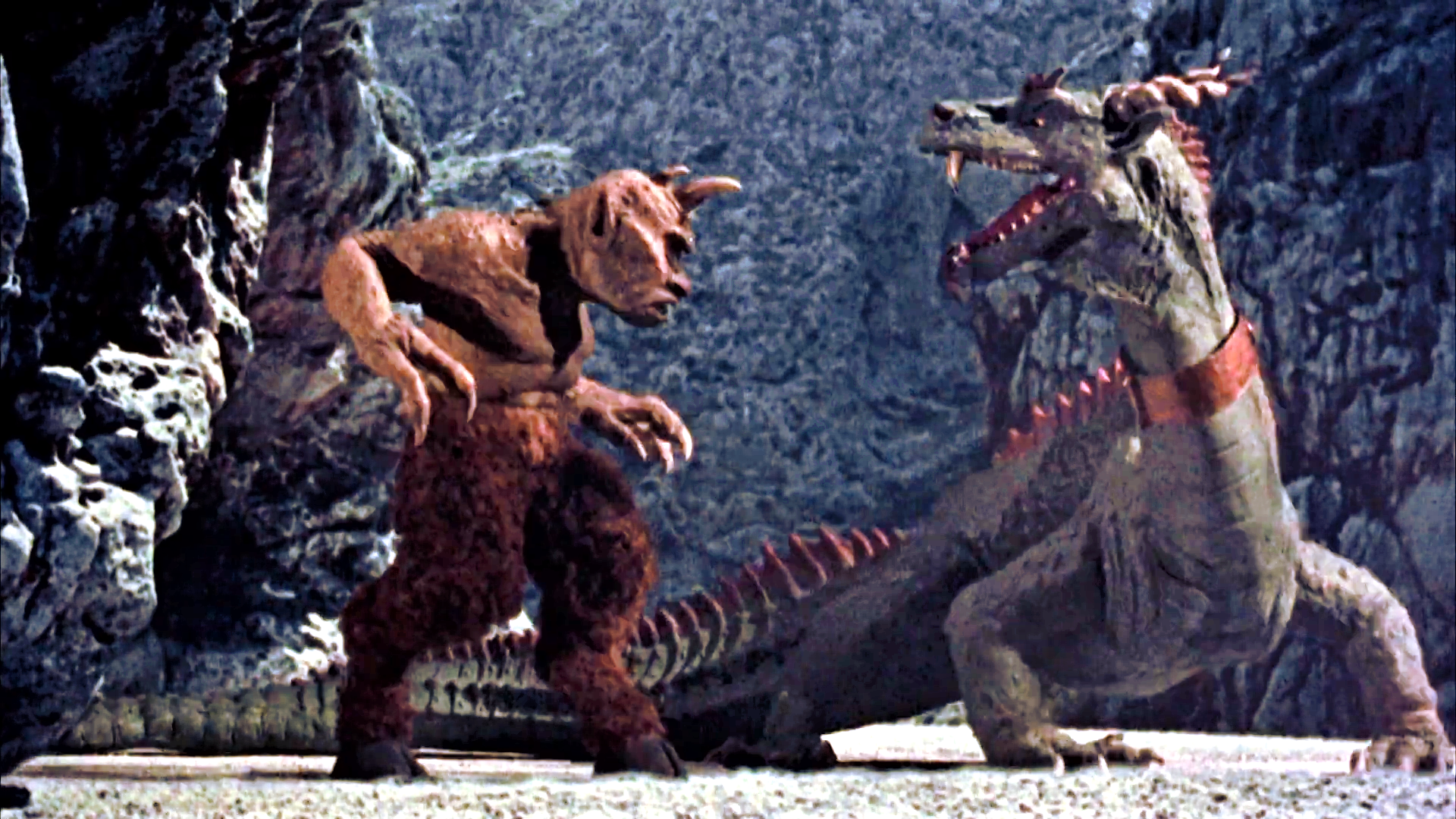
The cyclops and dragon battle sequence from the film.

Producer Charles H. Schneer announced the production in June 1957. It was a co-production between Columbia Pictures and his company Morningstar.

Schneer left for Europe to scout locations on 15 July. Filming started the following month in Granada, Spain.

=== Casting ===
The leads, Kerwin Mathews and Kathryn Grant, were under contract to Columbia, both having played in crime and war films in the years before.

=== Special effects ===
It took Ray Harryhausen 11 months to complete the stop-motion animation sequences for his first full color film, using proper lighting design and editing live action footage with rear projection. His "Dynamation" label was used for the first time on this film.

The cyclops, the film's most popular character with his horn, goat legs and cloven hooves, was based upon the Greek god Pan. Harryhausen lifted much of the creature's design—torso, chest, arms, poise and style of movement—from Ymir, the Venusian creature he animated in 20 Million Miles to Earth (1957). He used the same armature, removing Ymir's latex body.

Harryhausen's personal favorite was the serpent woman belly dancer, created by the magician Sokurah to entertain the Caliph and the Sultan. As reference for this creature with four arms and a cobra's tail, Harryhausen watched a dancer in Beirut, Lebanon." The figure was reused to make the Gorgon Medusa in Harryhausen's final film, Clash of the Titans (1981).

The original script had a climax with two cyclops fighting. It was replaced by a cyclops facing a dragon, a sequence that took nearly three weeks for Harryhausen to complete. It was planned to have the dragon breathing fire during its entirety but the cost was deemed too high. In the scenes where it does, Harryhausen filmed flames shooting out a flamethrower 30 to 40 feet against a night sky, then superimposed them near the dragon's mouth. A more than three feet long model difficult to animate, the dragon used parts of the Rhedosaurus from The Beast from 20,000 Fathoms.

The sword fight scene between Sinbad and the skeleton proved so popular with audiences that Harryhausen recreated and expanded it a few years later, with seven armed skeletons attacking the Greek hero Jason and his men in Jason and the Argonauts (1963).

== Film score ==
The music score for The 7th Voyage of Sinbad was composed by Bernard Herrmann, better known at the time for his collaboration with the director Alfred Hitchcock, and composing the film scores to Citizen Kane and The Day the Earth Stood Still. Herrmann went on to write the scores for three other Harryhausen films: Mysterious Island, The 3 Worlds of Gulliver, and Jason and the Argonauts. Of the four, Harryhausen regarded the score for The 7th Voyage of Sinbad as being the finest, due to the empathy Herrmann's main title composition evoked for the subject matter.

The soundtrack producer Robert Townson, who re-recorded the score in 1998 with the Royal Scottish National Orchestra, described the music as rich and vibrant, commenting: "I would cite The 7th Voyage of Sinbad as one of the scores which most validates film music as an art form and a forum where a great composer can write a great piece of music. As pure composition, I would place Sinbad beside anything else written this century and not worry about it being able to stand on its own".

== Box office ==
In the United States and Canada, the film earned $3.2 million in rentals upon release. It went on to gross $9 million in US revenue from 13,846,000 ticket sales. In France, the film sold 1,009,546 tickets, equivalent to an estimated $370,000 in revenue. (Note: See Film industry § Average ticket price.) In the Soviet Union, the film sold 70.1 million tickets, equivalent to an estimated $20 million in revenue. Worldwide, the film grossed an estimated $29.4 million from 84,955,546 ticket sales.

== Reception ==
The 7th Voyage of Sinbad continues to be well-reviewed, with many critics holding the opinion that it is the best film of the "Sinbad" trilogy. The film carries a 100% approval rating at the film review aggregator website Rotten Tomatoes, based on 16 reviews with a weighted average score of 7.7/10, with several reviewers citing its nostalgic value. Mountain Xpress critic Ken Hanke, for example, calls it "childhood memory stuff of the most compelling kind".

The film was released during Christmas 1958 to cash-in during the family holiday, but it continued to do well following the holiday period, becoming a sleeper hit. In its first three weeks the film grossed $3.5 million, including $500,000 at the Roxy Theatre in New York City. Its total rentals were more than $6 million worldwide.

Producer Edward Small, impressed with the film's success, produced a fantasy film on his own in 1962, titled Jack the Giant Killer, reuniting the starring cast members of The 7th Voyage, Kerwin Mathews as Jack and Torin Thatcher as the evil sorcerer Pendragon.

== Comic book adaptations ==
- Dell Four Color No. 944 (September 1958)
- Marvel Spotlight No. 25 (December 1975)

== See also ==
- List of American films of 1958
- List of films featuring miniature people

== Bibliography ==
- Dalton, Tony. The Art of Ray Harryhausen. London: Aurum, 2005. ISBN 9781845131142.
- Dalton, Tony. Ray Harryhausen: An Animated Life. London: Aurum, 2003. ISBN 9781854109408.
- Swires, Steve (April 1989). "Nathan Juran: The Fantasy Voyages of Jerry the Giant Killer Part One". Starlog Magazine. No. 141. pp. 56–62.
- Warren, Bill. Keep Watching the Skies: American Science Fiction Films of the Fifties, 21st Century Edition. Jefferson, North Carolina: McFarland & Company, 2009, (First edition 1982). ISBN 0899500323.
