= The 3 Worlds of Gulliver =

1960 film by Jack Sher

- Theatrical poster
- Directed by: Jack Sher
- Written by: Arthur Ross; Jack Sher
- Based on: Gulliver's Travels by: Jonathan Swift
- Produced by: Charles H. Schneer
- Starring: Kerwin Mathews; June Thorburn; Basil Sydney; Sherry Alberoni
- Cinematography: Wilkie Cooper
- Edited by: Raymond Poulton
- Music by: Bernard Herrmann
- Distributed by: Columbia Pictures
- Release date: December 16, 1960
- Running time: 100 minutes
- Country: United States
- Language: English

The 3 Worlds of Gulliver is a 1960 American Eastmancolor fantasy adventure film loosely based upon the 1726 novel Gulliver's Travels by Jonathan Swift. The film stars Kerwin Mathews as the title character, June Thorburn as his fiancée Elizabeth, and child actress Sherry Alberoni as Glumdalclitch.

Filmed in England and Spain, The 3 Worlds of Gulliver was directed by Jack Sher and featured stop-motion animation and special visual effects by Ray Harryhausen. The cast includes Martin Benson as Flimnap, Lee Patterson as Reldresal, Jo Morrow as Gwendolyn, Mary Ellis as the Queen of Brobdingnag, Marian Spencer as the Empress of Lilliput, Peter Bull as Lord Bermogg and Alec Mango as the Minister of Lilliput.

== Plot ==
In 1699, Dr Lemuel Gulliver is an English physician who seeks riches and adventure as a ship's doctor on a voyage around the world. His fiancée Elizabeth strongly wishes for him to settle down, and stows away aboard his ship to be near him. A storm develops and sweeps him overboard.

Gulliver is washed ashore on Lilliput, a land of tiny humans themed on the Middle East. The Lilliputians are afraid of Gulliver who they see as a giant and tie him down with stakes to the beach, but he eases their fears by performing several acts of kindness. He gains the trust of the Lilliputian emperor; though he also earns the anger and envy of Finance Minister Flimnap.

Interior Minister Reldresal intends to marry Gwendoline who, along with her father, was banished for rebelling against the emperor. He and Flimnap juggle, tightrope walk, and do acrobatics for the role of prime minister; with Gulliver helping him win by foiling Flimnap's assassins. Enraged and humiliated, Flimnap exposes Reldresel helping Gwendoline and her father, Lord Bermogg, who were both banished; leading to his arrest.

Gulliver frees Reldresel from the tower and reunites him with Gwendoline. From them, he learns the reasons for the Bermogg's banishment and Lilliput's war with Blefuscu, a neighbouring island themed on Southeast Asia, over a petty quarrel between the emperor and the king, his cousin, which end of an egg to cut. Seeking to end the war, Gulliver takes all of Blefuscu's warships.

The emperor gets angry with Gulliver for refusing to destroy Blefuscu, and grows jealous of him becoming more famous than him. A wildfire is accidentally started by a partying man, endangering everyone in the palace. Gulliver puts it out with wine; only to accidentally ruin the empress's dress. The emperor seizes this chance to remove him. Gulliver scolds the emperor for how war, pride, and vanity destroy everything for many including lovers; and also refuses Reldresal's idea of enforcing his ideals because he'd be as oppressive as the emperor. He escapes in a boat that he had previously built when the emperor orders his execution.

He makes his way to a large isle called Brobdingnag; unaware that it is inhabited by Brobdingnagians, a race of giants themed on the Medieval Europe. After making shore, he encounters a virtuous 40-foot peasant girl named Glumdalclitch, who finds him on the shore and carries him to the castle of King Brob. Their law requires that all tiny people be brought to the king, who has a collection of "tiny animals." Gulliver is delighted to find Elizabeth, who was washed ashore following a shipwreck. The king installs the two in a dollhouse and lets Glumdalclitch look after them.

The king marries Gulliver and Elizabeth. After the wedding, Gulliver and Elizabeth go outside to celebrate but are attacked by a giant squirrel, which drags Gulliver into its burrow. However, Glumdalclitch is alerted and saves Gulliver by pulling him out of the burrow using her hair. When Gulliver later defeats the king at chess and cures the queen of a simple stomachache, Prime Minister Makovan accuses Gulliver of witchcraft. Gulliver attempts to explain science to them, but this is taken as further proof of sorcery. Gulliver is forced to say what the king wanted to hear from him to save himself and Elizabeth; and is outraged to find the king lied, and scolds him for his ignorance and prejudice. Enraged, the king orders Gulliver's unleashes his pet crocodile against Gulliver; but Gulliver is able to slay the creature with a sword-themed brooch. The king orders him burned, but Glumdalclitch saves Gulliver and Elizabeth from the pursuing Brobdingnagians by placing them in her sewing basket and tossing it into a brook that flows out to the sea.

Gulliver and Elizabeth wake on a beach with Glumdalclitch's small basket behind them. A passerby of their own size indicates that they are only a short distance from their home in England. Elizabeth asks if it had all been a dream. Gulliver, now happy to settle down with Elizabeth, replies that the bad qualities of Lilliput's pettiness and Brobdingnag's ignorance are inside everyone. When Elizabeth asks about Glumdalclitch, Gulliver gives her a knowing look and says that she has yet to be born; hinting how the good qualities of the giant girl's compassion be inside.

== Cast ==
- Kerwin Mathews as Dr. Lemuel Gulliver
- Jo Morrow as Gwendolyn
- June Thorburn as Elizabeth
- Lee Patterson as Reldresal
- Grégoire Aslan as King Brob
- Basil Sydney as Emperor of Lilliput
- Charles Lloyd-Pack as Makovan
- Martin Benson as Flimnap
- Mary Ellis as Queen of Brobdingnag
- Marian Spencer as Empress of Lilliput
- Peter Bull as Lord Bermogg
- Alec Mango as Minister of Lilliput
- Sherri Alberoni as Glumdalclitch
- Oliver Johnston as Grinch
- Waveney Lee as Shrike

== Production ==
The project began as a script by Arthur Ross. He and producer Elliot Lewis pitched a fantasy film to NBC that would combine two Gulliver's Travels stories, "Lilliput" and "Brobdingdang." NBC approved the script but Ross says that the project died because of a strike by the Writers Guild. Jack Sher then became attached as producer and the project was planned at Universal as a feature.

Charles Schneer said that Bryan Foy developed the property at Columbia. When Foy moved to Warner Bros., chief executive Ben Kahane gave the project to Schneer. According to Schneer, Ross and Sher rewrote the script.

In October 1958, it was announced that Schneer, who called the project "the most complicated picture ever attempted," would produce Gulliver's Travels, to be directed by Jack Sher. Columbia was announced as the film's distributor. According to Sher, the film was allocated an insufficient budget.

The film, which was shot in Spain, featured 150 trick sequences. It would be the second film featuring Ray Harryhausen's "Dynamation" process; The 7th Voyage of Sinbad was the first. The oldest Harryhausen model still existing that was made for the film is that of the squirrel, obtained from a taxidermist by Harryhausen. The original armatures model of the crocodile used in the film was mysteriously lost.

According to Kerwin Matthews, Columbia wanted Jack Lemmon to play the lead, but Lemmon turned it down. Schneer says that Sher wanted Lemmon but Columbia did not: "He was considered a comedy actor, and wasn't taken seriously as a dramatic actor. Also, I don't think Harry Cohn wanted Lemmon to do the picture. So, Kerwin was really our only other choice. He was one of the few American actors who could play a classical role, and would look right in a period costume."

Jo Morrow starred in the film at the same time during which she was appearing in Our Man in Havana. She had an affair with Sher during filmmaking, and she says that it affected her performance.

Schenner later said:

Sher wanted to make a name for himself as a director but he didn't have sufficient experience to direct the picture. It was the first time we had that problem with a director. Fortunately, we had a wonderful cameraman named Wilkie Cooper. Ray, Wilkie and I directed the camera, and we let Sher talk the actors through their lines. We didn't want to undermine him with the actors, so we would tell him, 'This is what we want. Please do it'— and he would. Sher got the screen credit, but he was out of his depth, and he knew it.

The film's premiere, attended by Princess Margaret, was a benefit for charity.

== Reception ==
In The New York Times of December 17, 1960, Eugene Archer praised the film's technical achievement in stop-motion animation and enthusiastically recommended it for children but noted: "While the adults will find it all too mechanical to really capture the imagination, and may resent the unclear ending that seems certain to provoke some youthful queries, they should be grateful for a children's film that treats a classic without condescension or burlesque."

== Comic book adaptation ==
- Dell Four Color #1158 (January 1961)

== See also ==
- List of stop-motion films
- List of films featuring miniature people
