= Escape from New York =

1981 film by John Carpenter

- Theatrical release poster
- Directed by: John Carpenter
- Written by: John Carpenter; Nick Castle
- Produced by: Larry Franco; Debra Hill
- Starring: Kurt Russell; Lee Van Cleef; Ernest Borgnine; Donald Pleasence; Isaac Hayes; Harry Dean Stanton; Adrienne Barbeau
- Cinematography: Dean Cundey
- Edited by: Todd Ramsay
- Music by: John Carpenter; Alan Howarth
- Production companies: AVCO Embassy Pictures; International Film Investors; Goldcrest Films International; City Films
- Distributed by: AVCO Embassy Pictures
- Release date: July 10, 1981
- Running time: 99 minutes
- Country: United States
- Language: English
- Budget: $6 million
- Box office: $50 million

Escape from New York is a 1981 American independent science fiction action film co-written, co-scored, and directed by John Carpenter. It stars Kurt Russell, Lee Van Cleef, Ernest Borgnine, Donald Pleasence, Isaac Hayes, Harry Dean Stanton, and Adrienne Barbeau.

The film is set in 1997 and concerns a future crime-ridden dystopian United States, which has converted Manhattan Island in New York City into the country's sole maximum security prison. Air Force One is hijacked by anti-government insurgents who deliberately crash it into the walled-off borough. Snake Plissken (Russell), a special forces operative turned federal prisoner, is given 24 hours to rescue the President of the United States.

Carpenter wrote the film in the mid-1970s in reaction to the Watergate scandal, with additional script contributions from Nick Castle. After the success of Halloween (1978), he had enough influence to begin production and filmed it mainly in St. Louis, Missouri, on an estimated budget of $6 million. Debra Hill and Larry J. Franco served as the producers.

Released in the United States on July 10, 1981, the film received positive reviews from critics and was a commercial success, grossing more than $50 million at the box office. Escape from New York was nominated for four Saturn Awards, including Best Science Fiction Film and Best Direction. The film became a cult classic and was followed by a sequel, Escape from L.A. (1996), which was also directed and written by Carpenter and starred Russell.

== Plot ==
In 1988, amidst war between the United States and an alliance of China and the USSR, Manhattan has been converted into a maximum security prison to address a 400% increase in crime.

In 1997, while flying US President John Harker to a peace summit in Hartford, Air Force One is hijacked by a terrorist group. The President is handcuffed with a briefcase and put into an escape pod that drops into Manhattan as the aircraft crashes.

The United States Police Force (USPF), led by Commissioner Bob Hauk, are dispatched to rescue the President. Romero, a subordinate of the Duke of New York, warns Hauk that the President has been captured and will be killed if further rescue attempts are made. Meanwhile, decorated war hero and former Special Forces soldier Snake Plissken is about to be imprisoned in Manhattan after being convicted of robbing a Federal Reserve Depository. Snake accepts a deal from Hauk in which he will be pardoned in exchange for rescuing the President in time for the summit. To ensure his cooperation, Hauk has Snake injected with micro-explosives that will sever his carotid arteries in 23 hours. If Snake is successful, Hauk will neutralize the explosives.

Snake uses a stealth glider to land atop the World Trade Center, then follows the President's tracking device to a vaudeville theater, only to find the tracker on the arm of a vagrant. Inspecting the escape pod, Snake is ambushed by starving underground raiders, and his radio is destroyed. He is rescued by "Cabbie," a fan of Snake's who drives a taxi.

Cabbie takes Snake to Harold "Brain" Hellman, an adviser to the Duke and a former associate of Snake. An engineer, Brain has established a gasoline refinery fueling the city's remaining cars; he tells Snake that the Duke plans to lead a mass escape across the 69th Street Bridge, using the President as a human shield. Snake forces Brain and his girlfriend Maggie to lead him to the Duke's hideout at Grand Central Terminal. Snake finds the President but gets shot in the leg with a crossbow bolt and is overpowered by the Duke's men.

While Snake is forced to fight Duke's champion, Slag, in a match to the death, Brain and Maggie kill Romero and flee with the President. Snake kills Slag and finds the trio trying to escape in the glider. Inmates drop the glider off the roof, forcing the group to street level, where the Duke and his followers confront them. Cabbie arrives and offers to take them across the bridge. He reveals that he bartered with Romero for a cassette tape that contains information about nuclear fusion, intended to be an international peace offering. The President demands the cassette, but Snake refuses to hand it over.

The Duke gives chase, setting off mines as he tries to catch up. Brain guides Snake, but they hit a mine, and Cabbie is killed. As they continue on foot, Brain accidentally stumbles onto another mine. A distraught Maggie sacrifices herself to slow the Duke. Snake and the President reach the containment wall, and guards hoist the President up. The Duke opens fire, killing the guards before Snake subdues him. As the rope is lifting Snake, the Duke attempts to shoot him; but the President takes up a dead guard's rifle and kills the Duke. Snake is hoisted to safety, and Hauk's doctor neutralizes the explosives in his neck.

As the President prepares for a televised speech to the leaders at the summit meeting, he off-handedly thanks Snake for saving him and offers only half-hearted regret for the deaths of his friends and all the soldiers who fought for him; Snake walks away in disgust. Impressed by his actions and initiative, Hauk proudly offers Snake a job as his deputy; but he keeps walking without an answer. The President's speech commences, and he plays the cassette. To his embarrassment, it only plays Cabbie's favorite song, "Bandstand Boogie". As Snake walks away free, he pulls the real cassette from his pocket and destroys it.

== Cast ==
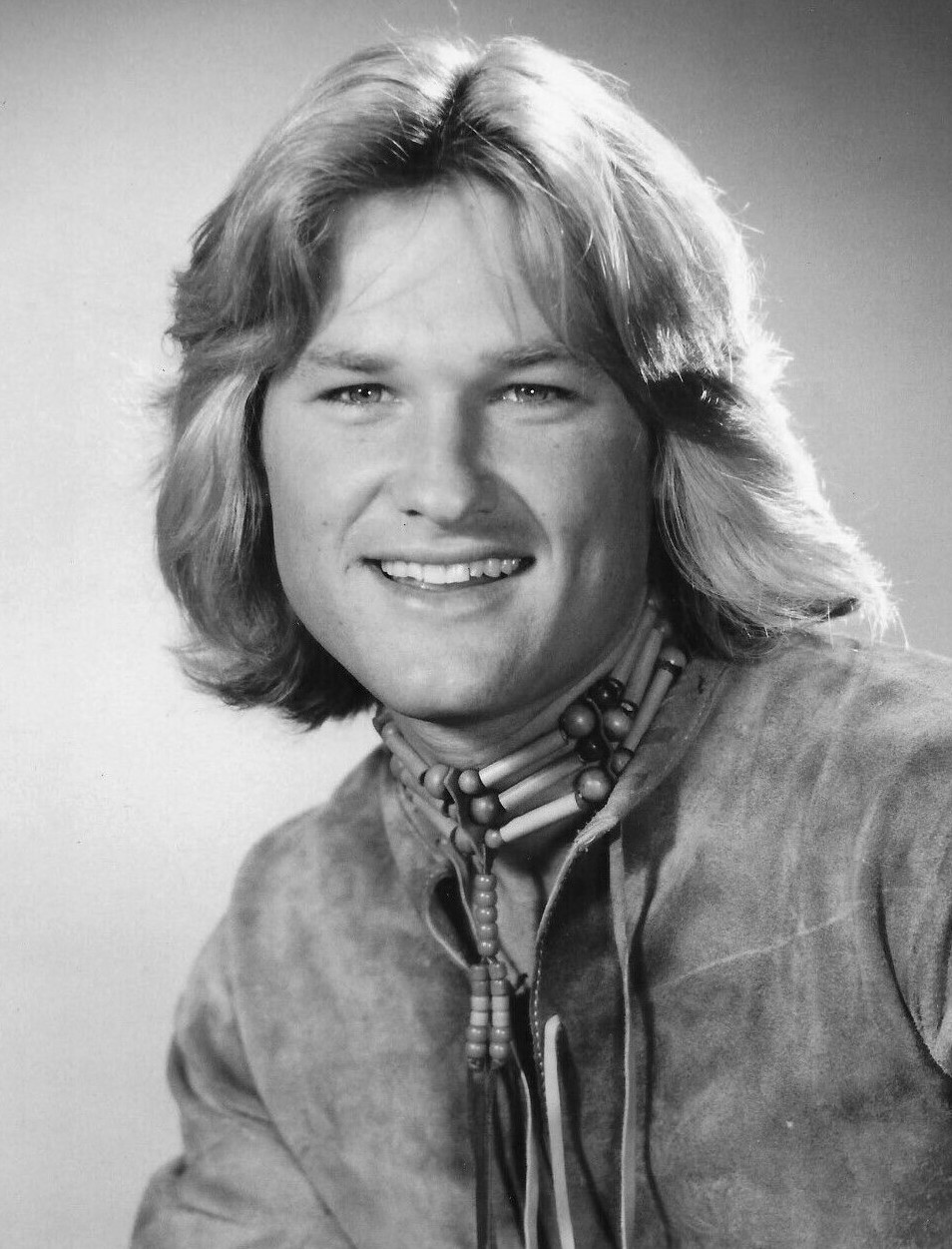
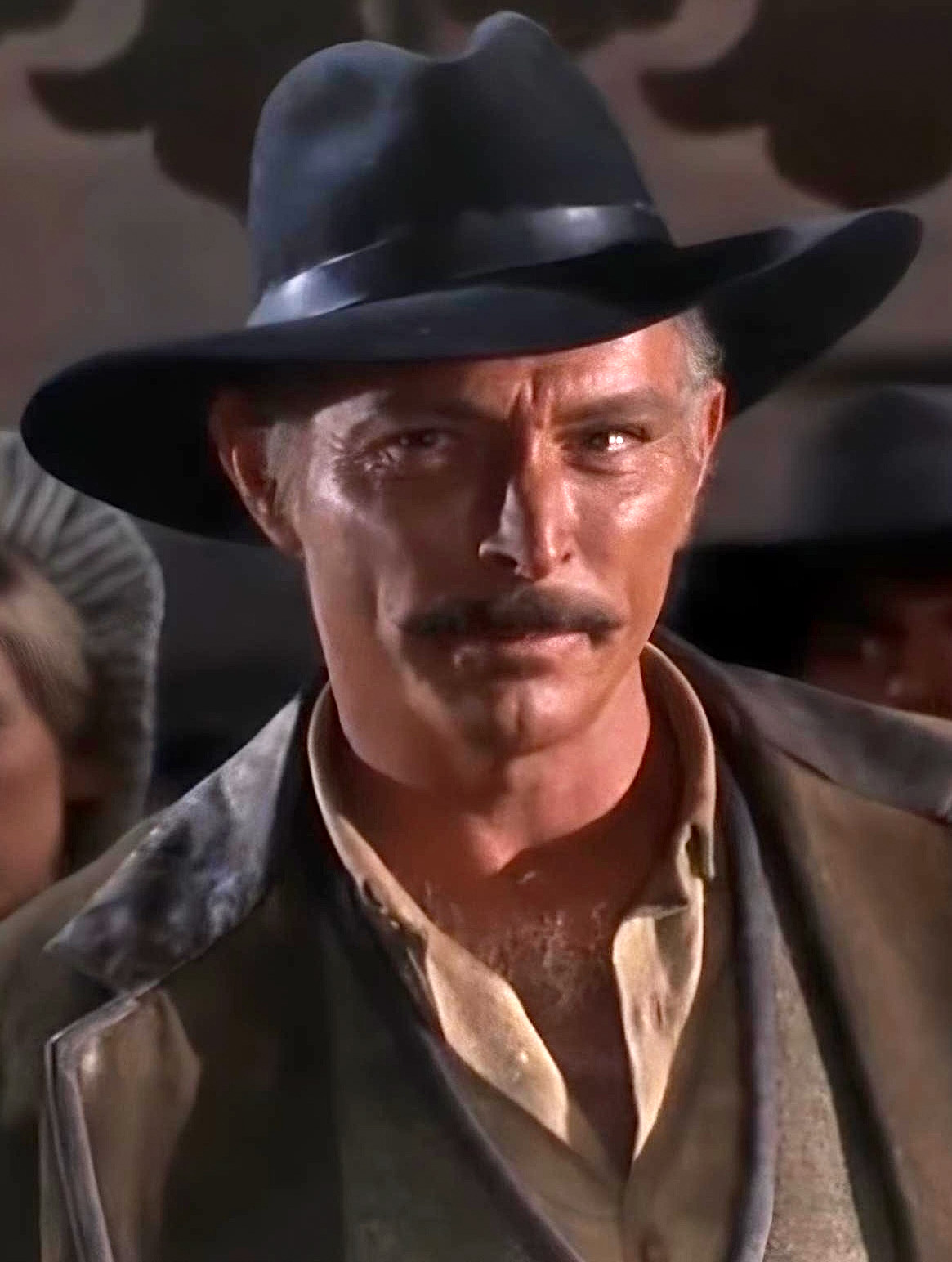
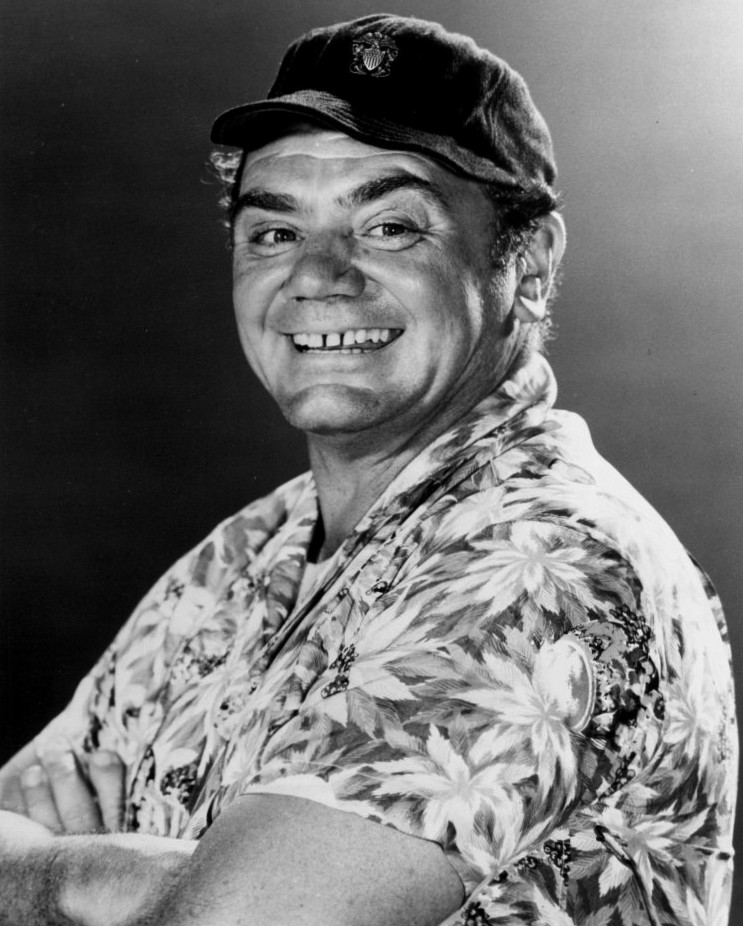
Kurt Russell (pictured in 1976), Lee Van Cleef (1967), and Ernest Borgnine (1962)
- Kurt Russell as S.D. "Snake" Plissken
- Lee Van Cleef as Bob Hauk
- Ernest Borgnine as Cabbie
- Donald Pleasence as The President
- Isaac Hayes as The Duke
- Season Hubley as Maureen, Girl In Chock Full o' Nuts
- Harry Dean Stanton as Harold "Brain" Hellman
- Adrienne Barbeau as Maggie
- Tom Atkins as Captain Rehme
- Charles Cyphers as Secretary of State
- Frank Doubleday as Romero
- Douglas "Ox" Baker as Slag
- John Strobel as Dr. Cronenberg

== Production ==
=== Development and writing ===
John Carpenter originally wrote the screenplay for Escape from New York in 1976, in the aftermath of Richard Nixon's Watergate scandal. Carpenter said, "The whole feeling of the nation was one of real cynicism about the president." He wrote the screenplay, but no studio wanted to make it because, according to Carpenter, "[i]t was too violent, too scary, [and] too weird". He had been inspired by the film Death Wish, which was very popular at the time. He did not agree with this film's philosophy, but liked how it conveyed "the sense of New York as a kind of jungle, and I wanted to make a science-fiction film along these lines".

International Film Investors agreed to provide 50% of the budget, and Goldcrest Films signed a co-financing deal with them. They ended up providing £720,000 of the budget and making a profit of £672,000 from their investment after earning £1,392,000.

=== Casting ===
AVCO Embassy Pictures, the film's financial backer, preferred Charles Bronson, Tommy Lee Jones or Chuck Norris to play the role of Snake Plissken to Carpenter's choice of Kurt Russell, who was trying to overcome the "lightweight" screen image conveyed by his roles in several Disney comedies. Carpenter refused to cast Bronson on the grounds that he was too old, and because he worried that he could lose directorial control over the film with an experienced actor. At the time, Russell described his character as "a mercenary, and his style of fighting is a combination of Bruce Lee, The Exterminator, and Darth Vader, with Eastwood's vocal-ness." Russell suggested that the character should wear an eyepatch. All that matters to Snake, according to the actor, is "the next 60 seconds. Living for exactly that next minute is all there is." Russell used a rigorous diet and exercise program to develop a lean and muscular build. He also endeavored to stay in character between takes and throughout the shooting, as he welcomed the opportunity to get away from the Disney comedies he had done previously. He did find it necessary to remove the eyepatch between takes, as wearing it constantly seriously affected his depth perception.

=== Pre-production ===
Carpenter had just made Dark Star, but no one wanted to hire him as a director, so he assumed he would make it in Hollywood as a screenwriter. The filmmaker went on to do other films with the intention of making Escape later. After the success of Halloween, Avco-Embassy signed producer Debra Hill and him to a two-picture deal. The first film from this contract was The Fog. Initially, the second film he was going to make to finish the contract was The Philadelphia Experiment, but because of script-writing problems, Carpenter rejected it in favor of this project. However, Carpenter felt something was missing and recalls, "This was basically a straight action film. And at one point, I realized it really doesn't have this kind of crazy humor that people from New York would expect to see." He brought in Nick Castle, a friend from his film-school days at University of Southern California, who played "The Shape" in Halloween. Castle invented the Cabbie character and came up with the film's ending.

The film's setting proved to be a potential problem for Carpenter, who needed to create a decaying, semi-destroyed version of New York City on a shoestring budget. The film's production designer Joe Alves and he rejected shooting on location in New York City because it would be too hard to make it look like a destroyed city. Carpenter suggested shooting on a movie back lot, but Alves nixed that idea "because the texture of a real street is not like a back lot." They sent Barry Bernardi, their location manager (and associate producer), "on a sort of all-expense-paid trip across the country looking for the worst city in America," producer Debra Hill remembers.

Bernardi suggested East St. Louis, Illinois, because it was filled with old buildings "that exist in New York now, and [that] have that seedy run-down quality" that the team was looking for. East St. Louis, sitting across the Mississippi River from the more prosperous St. Louis, Missouri, had entire neighborhoods burned out in 1976 during a massive urban fire. Hill said in an interview, "block after block was burnt-out rubble. In some places, there was absolutely nothing, so that you could see three and four blocks away." Also, Alves found an old bridge to serve as the "69th St. Bridge". The filmmaker purchased the Old Chain of Rocks Bridge for one dollar from the government and then gave it back to them, for the same amount, once production was completed, "so that they wouldn't have any liability," Hill remembers, although Carpenter later said he has no memory of this transaction. Locations across the river in St. Louis were used, including Union Station and the Fox Theatre, both of which have since been renovated, as well as the building that would eventually become the Schlafly Tap Room microbrewery.

=== Filming ===
Carpenter and his crew persuaded the city to shut off the electricity to 10 blocks at a time at night. The film was shot from August to November 1980. It was a tough and demanding shoot for the filmmaker as he recalls. "We'd finish shooting at about 6 am and I'd just be going to sleep at 7 when the sun would be coming up. I'd wake up around 5 or 6 pm, depending on whether or not we had dailies, and by the time I got going, the sun would be setting. So for about two and a half months I never saw daylight, which was really strange." The gladiatorial fight to the death scene between Snake and Slag (played by professional wrestler Ox Baker) was filmed in the Grand Hall at St. Louis Union Station. Russell has stated, "That day was a nightmare. All I did was swing a [spiked] bat at that guy and get swung at in return. He threw a trash can in my face about five times ... I could have wound up in pretty bad shape." In addition to shooting on location in St. Louis, Carpenter shot parts of the film in Los Angeles. Various interior scenes were shot on a sound stage; the final scenes were shot at the Sepulveda Dam in Sherman Oaks. New York served as a location, as did Atlanta, to use their futuristic-looking rapid-transit system (the latter scenes were cut from the final film). In New York City, Carpenter persuaded federal officials to grant access to Liberty Island. "We were the first film company in history allowed to shoot on Liberty Island at the Statue of Liberty at night. They let us have the whole island to ourselves. We were lucky. It wasn't easy to get that initial permission. They'd had a bombing three months earlier and were worried about trouble".

The simulated wire-frame effect

Carpenter was interested in creating two distinct looks for the movie. "One is the police state, high tech, lots of neon, a United States dominated by underground computers. That was easy to shoot compared to the Manhattan Island prison sequences, which had few lights, mainly torch lights, like feudal England". Certain matte paintings were rendered by James Cameron, who was at the time a special-effects artist with Roger Corman's New World Pictures. Cameron was also one of the directors of photography on the film. As Snake pilots the glider into the city, three screens on his control panel display wireframe animations of the landing target on the World Trade Center and surrounding buildings. Carpenter initially wanted high-tech computer graphics, which were very expensive, even for such a simple animation. The effects crew filmed the miniature model set of New York City they used for other scenes under black light, with reflective tape placed along every edge of the model buildings. Only the tape is visible and appears to be a three-dimensional wireframe animation.

== Home media ==
=== LaserDisc releases ===
Escape from New York was released on LaserDisc 10 times between 1983 and 1998. A 1994 Collector's Edition includes a commentary track by John Carpenter and Kurt Russell that is still included on more recent DVD releases of the film.

=== DVD releases ===
Escape from New York was released on DVD twice by MGM (USA), and once by Momentum Pictures (UK). One MGM release is a barebones edition containing just the theatrical trailer. Another version is the Collector's Edition, a two-disc set featuring a high definition remastered transfer with a 5.1 stereo audio track, two commentaries (one by John Carpenter and Kurt Russell, another by producer Debra Hill and Joe Alves), a making-of featurette, the first issue of a comic book series titled John Carpenter's Snake Plissken Chronicles, and the 10-minute Colorado bank robbery deleted opening sequence.

MGM's special edition of the 1981 film was not released until 2003 because the original negative had gone missing. The workprint containing deleted scenes finally turned up in a salt-mine film depository in Hutchinson, Kansas. The excised scenes feature Snake Plissken robbing a bank, introducing the character of Plissken and establishing a backstory. Director John Carpenter decided to add the original scenes into the special edition release as an extra only: "After we screened the rough cut, we realized that the movie didn't really start until Snake got to New York. It wasn't necessary to show what sent him there." The film has been released on the UMD format for Sony's PlayStation Portable.

=== Blu-ray release ===
On August 3, 2010, MGM Home Entertainment released Escape From New York as a bare-bones Blu-ray. Scream Factory, in association with Shout! Factory, released the film on a special edition Blu-ray on April 21, 2015.

== Reception ==
=== Box office ===
Escape from New York opened in New York and Los Angeles July 10, 1981. The film grossed $26 million in American theaters in summer 1981. Worldwide it grossed over $50 million.

=== Critical response ===
The film received generally positive reviews. Newsweek magazine wrote of Carpenter: "[He has a] deeply ingrained B-movie sensibility – which is both his strength and limitation. He does clean work, but settles for too little. He uses Russell well, however". In Time magazine, Richard Corliss wrote, "John Carpenter is offering this summer's moviegoers a rare opportunity: to escape from the air-conditioned torpor of ordinary entertainment into the hothouse humidity of their own paranoia. It's a trip worth taking". Vincent Canby, in his review for The New York Times, wrote, "[The film] is not to be analyzed too solemnly, though. It's a toughly told, very tall tale, one of the best escape (and escapist) movies of the season". On the other hand, in his negative review for the Chicago Reader, critic Dave Kehr, wrote "it fails to satisfy – it gives us too little of too much". Roger Ebert of The Chicago Sun-Times gave Escape from New York a mixed review, saying it was well-made but suffered by competing with the superior Raiders of the Lost Ark for summer action films that year. Russell was trying too hard to shake off his image from starring in Disney films during his younger years, Ebert thought, and while Pleasence was a good actor in other films he was not convincing as the U.S. President. In summary: “Everything is here, and it all works fairly well, but it never quite comes together as an involving story or overpowering adventure.”

Christopher John reviewed Escape from New York in Ares Magazine #10 and commented, "It is solid summer entertainment of unusually high caliber. By not pretending to be more than it is, but by also not settling for any less than it could be, Escape becomes an exciting, fast-moving drama, the likes of which we haven't seen in years."

C. J. Henderson reviewed Escape from New York for Pegasus magazine and stated that "Word got out that the film was bad. The people who wanted sex and violence stopped going, and the people who would have enjoyed the film said, 'Well, if those kinds of people aren't going to see it, it must really be bad,' and stayed home as well."

On the review aggregator website Rotten Tomatoes, 71% of 163 critics' reviews are positive. The website's consensus reads: "It may not make the most of its ingenious dystopian premise, but Escape from New York remains a visually striking and thrilling sci-fi actioner, elevated by pitch-black humor and Kurt Russell's charismatically gruff Snake Plissken." Metacritic, which uses a weighted average, assigned the film a score of 76 out of 100, based on 12 critics, indicating "generally favorable" reviews. Audiences polled by CinemaScore gave the film an average grade of "B+" on an A+ to F scale.

=== Legacy ===
Cyberpunk pioneer William Gibson credits the film as an influence on his 1984 science fiction novel Neuromancer. "I was intrigued by the exchange in one of the opening scenes where the Warden says to Snake 'You flew the Gullfire over Leningrad, didn't you?' It turns out to be just a throwaway line, but for a moment it worked like the best SF where a casual reference can imply a lot". Popular video game director Hideo Kojima copied aspects of the film for his Metal Gear series. Solid Snake heavily resembles the character Snake Plissken. In Metal Gear Solid 2: Sons of Liberty, Snake even uses the alias "Pliskin" to hide his real identity during most of the game. J. J. Abrams, producer of the 2008 film Cloverfield, mentioned that a scene in his film, which shows the head of the Statue of Liberty crashing into a New York street, was inspired by the poster for Escape from New York. Empire magazine ranked Snake Plissken number 29 in their "The 100 Greatest Movie Characters" poll.

== Franchise ==
=== Sequel ===
A sequel, Escape from L.A., was released in 1996, with Carpenter returning along with Russell, now also a producer and co-writer.

=== Remake ===
A remake for Escape from New York began development in 2007, when New Line Cinema won the rights to remake in a bidding war. Gerard Butler was attached to play Snake Plissken, Neal H. Moritz would produce through his Original Film company, and Ken Nolan would be in charge of the screenplay. Len Wiseman was announced to direct, but was later replaced by Brett Ratner, who also stepped down from the project. In April 2010, Variety reported that Breck Eisner was being looked at to direct a remake of Escape from New York, with David Kajganich and Allan Loeb providing revisions to the script. It was later announced in 2011 that New Line had dropped the remake completely. In January 2015, 20th Century Fox purchased the remake rights, with The Picture Company producing. In March 2017, it was announced that Robert Rodriguez would direct a remake of the film with Carpenter producing it. In February 2019, it was reported that Leigh Whannell would be writing the script after Luther creator Neil Cross completed a recent iteration of the project. Wyatt Russell, son of Kurt, was considered to portray Snake Plissken, but he expressed no interest in playing the role, considering it "career suicide." In November 2022, it was revealed that Radio Silence would be directing the film, with Andrew Rona, Alex Heineman, and Radio Silence producing, and Carpenter serving as an executive producer, and that it was, then, in search for a writer. The next month, the film was announced to be a sequel, rather than a remake.

By April 2026, a new reimagining of the film had entered development at StudioCanal, with Zack Snyder set to write and direct the film the same year in June.

=== Cancelled anime ===
In 2003, Carpenter was planning an anime spin-off of Escape from New York, with Outlaw Star's Mitsuru Hongo slated to direct.

== Other media ==
=== Novelization ===
In 1981, Bantam Books published a movie tie-in novelization written by Mike McQuay that adopts a lean, humorous style reminiscent of the film. The novel includes significant scenes that were cut from the film, such as the Federal Reserve Depository robbery that results in Snake's incarceration. The novel provides background on the relationship between Snake and Hauk—presenting the characters as disillusioned war veterans, and deepening the relationship that was only hinted in the film. The novel also explains how Snake lost his eye during the Battle for Leningrad in World War III, how Hauk became warden of New York, and Hauk's quest to find his crazed son, who lives somewhere in the prison. The novel gives greater detail on the world in which these characters live, at times presenting a future even bleaker than the one depicted in the film. It explains that the West Coast is a no-man's land, and the nation's population is gradually being driven insane by nerve gas as a result of World War III. The novel also clarifies that the president's plan for the cassette tape is not benevolent. Rather than presenting to the world a new energy source in the form of nuclear fusion (as claimed in the film), the tape actually reveals the successful development of a "fallout-free thermonuclear weapon, which would grant the US supremacy in the global conflict.

=== Comic books ===
Marvel Comics released the one-shot The Adventures of Snake Plissken in January 1997. The story takes place sometime between Escape from New York and before his famous Cleveland escape mentioned in Escape from L.A. Snake has robbed Atlanta's Centers for Disease Control of some engineered metaviruses and is looking for buyers in Chicago. Finding himself in a deal that is really a set-up, he makes his getaway and exacts revenge on the buyer for ratting him out to the United States Police Force. In the meantime, a government lab has built a robot called ATACS (Autonomous Tracking And Combat System) that can catch criminals by imprinting their personalities upon its program to predict and anticipate a specific criminal's every move. The robot's first test subject is America's public enemy number one, Snake Plissken. After a brief battle, the tide turns when ATACS copies Snake to the point of fully becoming his personality. Now recognizing the government as the enemy, ATACS sides with Snake. Unamused, Snake sucker punches the machine and destroys it. As ATACS shuts down, it can only ask him, "Why?" Snake just walks off, answering, "I don't need the competition".

In 2003, CrossGen and Hurricane Entertainment published John Carpenter's Snake Plissken Chronicles, a four-part comic book miniseries. The story takes place a day or so after the events of Escape from New York. Snake has been given a military Humvee after his presidential pardon and makes his way to Atlantic City. Although the director's cut of Escape from New York shows Snake was caught after a bank job, this story has Snake finishing up a second heist that was planned before his capture. The job entails stealing the car in which John F. Kennedy was assassinated from a casino before delivering it to a buyer in the Gulf of Mexico. Snake partners with a man named Marrs who ends up double-crossing him. Left for dead in a sinking crab cage, Snake escapes and is saved by a passing fisherman named Captain Ron (an in-joke referring to Kurt Russell's 1992 comedy, Captain Ron). When Ron denies Snake's request to use his boat to beat Marrs to the robbery, Snake decides to kill him. When Snake ends up saving Ron from the Russian mob, who wants money, Ron changes his mind and helps Snake. Once at the casino, Snake comes face-to-face with Marrs and his men, who arrive at the same time, ending in a high-speed shootout. Snake gets away with the car and its actress portraying Jackie Kennedy, leaving Marrs to be caught by the casino owner, who cuts him a deal to bring his car back and live. After some trouble, Snake manages to finally get the car to the buyer's yacht, using Ron's boat, and is then attacked by Marrs. Following the firefight, the yacht and car are destroyed, Marrs and Captain Ron are dead, and Snake makes his escape in a helicopter with the 30 million credits owed to him for the job. The series was written by William O'Neill and penciled by Tone Rodriguez with Jan Utstein as editor.

In 2014, BOOM! Studios began publishing an Escape from New York comic book by writer, Christopher Sebela. The first issue of the series was released on December 3, 2014, and the story picks up moments after the end of the film.

BOOM! released a crossover comics miniseries between Snake and Jack Burton titled Big Trouble in Little China/Escape from New York in October 2016.

=== Board games ===
An Escape from New York board game was released in 1981 by TSR, Inc. Another board game was crowd-funded in 2022.

=== Cancelled video game ===
A video game adaptation was in development in 2004–2005.

== Unauthorized remake ==
A 2015 ruling by the French Tribunal de Paris found that the French film Lockout (2012) had plagiarized both Escape from New York and its sequel Escape from L.A. John Carpenter was awarded €20,000, with co-writer Nick Castle getting €10,000, and €50,000 given to rights holder StudioCanal. Lockout's writer and producer Luc Besson appealed the ruling, which was rejected in July 2016. The claimant's total damages were increased to €450,000.

== Bibliography ==
- John Walsh (December 14, 2021). Escape from New York: The Official Story of the Film. Titan Books.
