= The Third Man: The Official Story of the Film =

2024 book by John Walsh

- Author: John Walsh
- Language: English
- Genre: Film history
- Publisher: Titan Books
- Publication date: 1 October 2024
- Publication place: United Kingdom
- Media type: Print (hardcover)
- Pages: 192
- ISBN: 978-1-83541-001-1

The Third Man: The Official Story of the Film is a 2024 book by British author and filmmaker John Walsh, published to coincide with the 75th anniversary of the 1949 film The Third Man. The book provides a retrospective on the making of the classic film noir. It includes unpublished photographs, new interviews, and details on the real-life inspirations behind the story.

== Content ==
The book covers the film's production history, from its development to post-production challenges. It discusses the battle for ownership between American producer David O. Selznick and British producer Alexander Korda, which led to legal disputes.

Some elements of the film are explored in detail, including the zither score by Anton Karas, locations in post-war Vienna, and set pieces such as the sewer chase and Ferris wheel scene. Cited interviews describe star Orson Welles' initial reluctance to participate in the film and his drunken nights with co-star Joseph Cotten. The book also examines the film's lasting influence on filmmakers including Martin Scorsese.

In an interview, Walsh said his research discovered new material on the film's production, including the identity of the real-life "third man" and that he noticed many links to espionage themes that influenced the James Bond series.

== Reception ==
The Consulting Detective blog called it "an authoritative and comprehensive guide to one of cinema's greatest achievements that is a delight to read."

Empire Magazine gave it four stars, stating that "Walsh’s new history is an absorbing and insightful take on Carol Reed’s defining post-war thriller. There is some lovely behind-the-scenes colour – one section is subtitled 'Orson Goes Down The Drain' – and a fascinating account of when the world briefly went zither-crazy for Anton Karas’ famous score."

SciFiPulse praised Walsh for taking readers "on a journey through every aspect of the film's production," including firsthand accounts where possible.

The blog Blazing Minds described it as "fascinating" and "hard to put down”.

FilmJuice noted its "painstakingly researched yet structured in a simple, accessible format”.

IndieWire said the book "looks to give the definitive account of the making of the film."

The Film Stage called it “beautifully illustrated".

The blog Cinema Sentries described It as “a thorough and engaging examination of various stages of the production.”
