= The Wicker Man: The Official Story of the Film =

2023 non-fiction book by John Walsh

- Author: John Walsh
- Language: English
- Genre: Fantasy film
- Publisher: Titan Books
- Publication date: October 24, 2023
- Publication place: United Kingdom
- Media type: Print (Hardcover)
- Pages: 192 (First edition, hardcover)
- ISBN: 9781803365084 (First edition, hardcover)

The Wicker Man: The Official Story of the Film is the sixth book by John Walsh. It was published on 24 October 2023 to coincide with the 50th anniversary of the folk horror film The Wicker Man.

== Overview ==
The book is a behind-the-scenes look at the making of the British folk horror film The Wicker Man (1973), directed by Robin Hardy from a screenplay by Anthony Shaffer, loosely based on the 1967 novel Ritual by David Pinner. The book looks at the behind-the-scenes stories and includes new and archive interviews from its stars Edward Woodward, Britt Ekland, Diane Cilento, Ingrid Pitt, and Christopher Lee.

The book shared newly discovered images and materials.

== Reception ==
The book received a 'Book of the Year' nomination in the 2024 Rondo Hatton Classic Horror Awards.

The Sunday Telegraph reported a new interview from the book by the film’s star Britt Ekland in which she said she had been tricked into a nude scene in the film.

SFX commented on the book's research and the discoveries' unflinching nature. "The author conducted 15 original interviews, key among them discussions with production designer Seamus Flannery, producer Michael Deeley and Peter Snell – then MD of production company British Lion. Flannery is absolutely excoriating about director Robin Hardy, variously labelling him 'just unpleasant', 'a nasty little man' and 'in love with himself'."

Starburst highlighted the sometimes forgotten origins of the film from an original novel. "An interesting addition is author David Pinner, who wrote the novel Ritual, which formed the basis of the story developed by Anthony Shaffer and Hardy. The interview he gives is both informative and entertaining. We also get some insight into real-life pagan rites, particularly those involving large men-shaped structures, adding more elements of reality to the tale."

Roger Ebert's review site said, "Walsh not only offers new behind-the-scenes details but unpacks why this film has maintained a growing legacy with new interviews and never-before-seen material. It's a dense, well-assembled, gorgeous book, one of the best art books in years for horror fans."
