= Conan the Barbarian: The Official Story of the Film =

2023 non-fiction book by John Walsh

Conan The Barbarian The Official Story of the Film
- Author: John Walsh
- Language: English
- Genre: Fantasy film
- Publisher: Titan Books
- Publication date: August 8, 2023
- Publication place: United Kingdom
- Media type: Print (Hardcover)
- Pages: 176 (First edition, hardcover)
- ISBN: 9781803361765 (First edition, hardcover)

Conan The Barbarian: The Official Story of the Film is the sixth book by the English filmmaker John Walsh, published on August 8, 2023. This is a behind-the-scenes look at the making of the 1982 film Conan The Barbarian, directed by John Milius and starring Arnold Schwarzenegger. This large format coffee table-style book tells the story of how the original stories based on the Robert E. Howard series were adapted for cinema audiences.

== Overview ==
The Hollywood Reporter first announced the book on June 21, 2022, as part of a wider rights deal with Conan rights holder for reissues of comic books and novels based on the character by Robert E Howard with British publisher Titan Books.

Starburst Magazine discussed the materials found, including

artwork from the legendary Frank Frazetta is presented beautifully in full-page reproductions that show how the character was envisaged for the sixties book covers. Other stunning illustrations come from production designer Ron Cobb’s paintings and illustrations that helped the film look so distinctive. Likewise, all aspects of the film’s creation – and those that made the magic come alive – are covered with some rare reproductions of sketches and the like.

Empire Magazine summarises the book's account of what could have been made with the film’s original director.

The first attempt to bring the character to screen came in the late 1970s, when Oliver Stone first wrote a screenplay. Little of that script, written in a "drug-fever dream", actually made it to the screen, but in Walsh's telling, it sounds wild: Stone conceived of Conan battling a Dante's Inferno-esque army of 20,000 pig mutants, insect demons, "hyena heads", and more. His version would have cost $100 million - an unthinkable budget at the time.”

The Spanish language review site Negativa mentions the European locations uncovered by the book.

John Walsh's book, as expected, comes to us full of information about the filming of the film, whose production was moved to Spain after a failed attempt to film in Yugoslavia, but he does very well in starting by putting the character in context.

Borg.com noted the book includes interviews with Schwarzenegger, Stone, Milius, and Raffaella De Laurentiis.

SciFi Bulletin discussed the book’s chapter on the original unmade film planned by Oliver Stone. “We learn about the years taken to develop the movie at one stage Oliver Stone wrote an ‘unfilmable’ drug-fuelled script.”

Horror Cult Film focussed on the part traditional visual effects played in the film’s production.

But we also get a lot that very few will have seen; the “old school” special effects lover in me really loved pictures showing the combining of models and matte paintings, some of which I’d never realised were actually models and matte paintings because they were so good.

SciFi Pulse looked at the impracticalities of Oliver Stone's original screenplay.

“Stone’s screenplay was never viewed as filmable as it was very much ahead of its time with Orcs and many of the fantasy staples that moviegoers would not get to see until the 2000s in The Lord of The Rings trilogy.”

Forces of Geek said the book gives "fascinating insights into the development of one of the best-loved fantasy films of the 1980s.”
