= Sofa Surfers (TV series) =

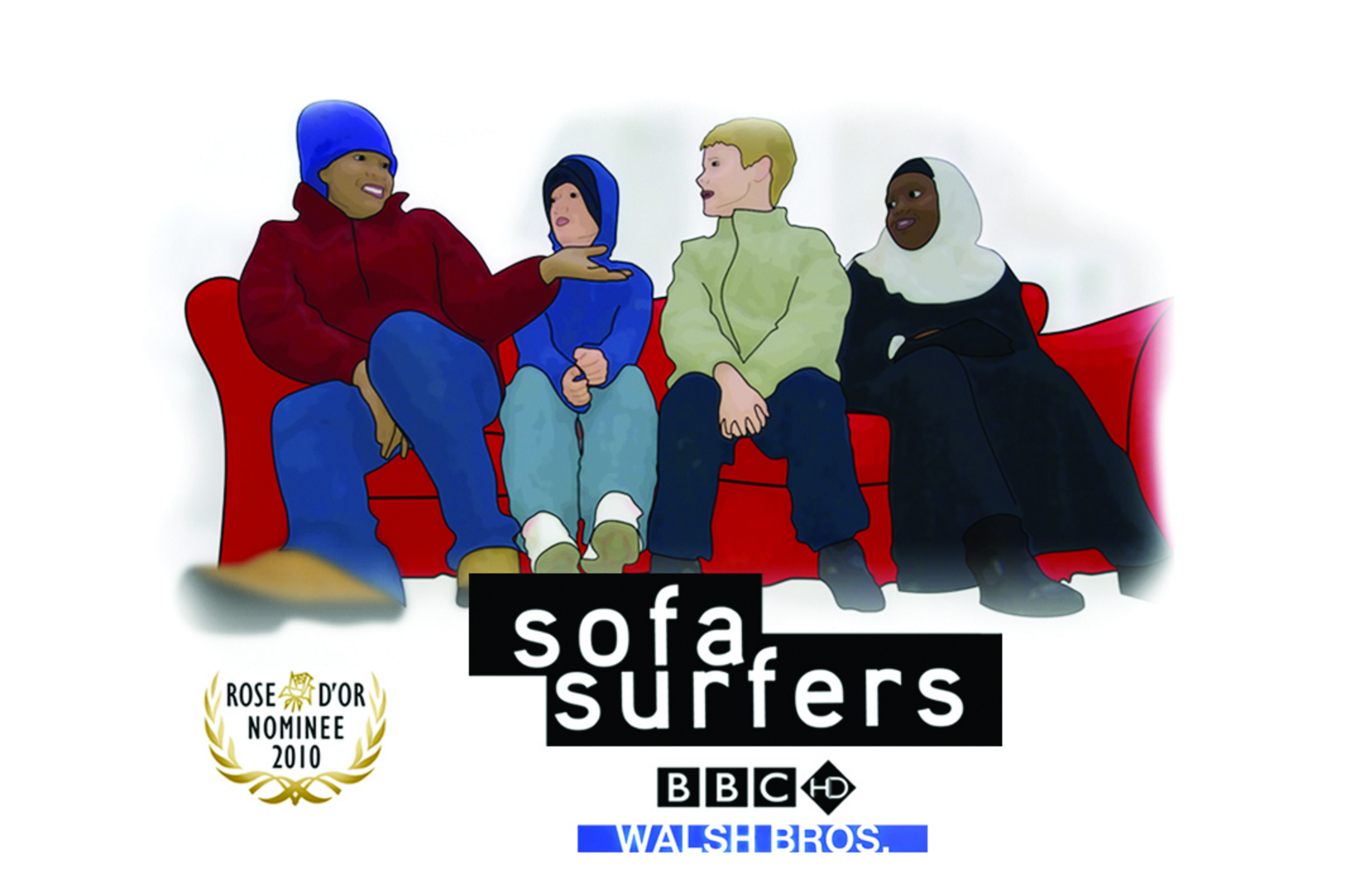
- Television poster
- Directed by: John Walsh
- Narrated by: John Walsh
- Country of origin: United Kingdom
- Original language: English

Production
- Executive producer: Roger James
- Producer: John Walsh
- Running time: 5 x 30 min.
- Production company: Walsh Bros Ltd.

Original release
- Release: 16 March 2009

Sofa Surfers is a British documentary series for the BBC by John Walsh of Walsh Bros Ltd. There are over 130,000 children living in the UK today without a permanent place they can call home. Sofa Surfers is a BBC documentary series which takes a look into the lives of four homeless children living in different types of temporary accommodation. This is thought to be the first children’s documentary dedicated to this subject. Using animation and rotoscoping techniques by the company White Balance, the series has been described by the Whittington Hospital, which features in the film, as a watershed moment in children’s documentaries in the UK. The series was part of the BBC's homeless season of programmes.

The film attempted to show the real lives of homelessness children through a week of observational documentaries aimed at an audience of 6–12 years old. Its approach was enabling the young and vulnerable contributors to speak candidly about their situation, and employed current animation techniques to bring those stories alive. Each episode featured testimony from children, as young as six, and showed their resilience, black humour and mature understanding of the incredibly difficult circumstances they were in. Walsh spoke on BBC News about challenges making the series.

Two episode we filmed at the Chester-based charity Save The Family. One episode here included an interview with Iain Duncan Smith MP, supporter of the charity.

Walsh made the acclaimed three part documentary series Headhunting The Homeless for BBC2 in 2003.

== Episodes ==
There have been 22 screenings of the episodes from this series, below are the details for the first UK transmissions.

| Episode | Date | Time | Channel | Description |
|---|---|---|---|---|
| 1. Shane | 16 March 2009 | 18.00 | BBC1 | The first programme follows Shane, a bright articulate nine year old who is insightful about his homeless position, Shane and his family are living in emergency accommodation and make their fifth move in six months and find cockroaches and a leaky bathroom in their latest home. When Christmas arrives the cupboards are nearly bare as mum struggles to make ends meet. |
| 2. Amanda | 17 March 2009 | 18.00 | BBC1 | Amanda, aged 14, is the subject of Tuesday’s show, she recently moved into a hostel in north London with her father and her brother. It is a big adjustment from her previous life in America. Her Mum and two sisters are in Nigeria, so this is an opportunity for her to get to know Dad again after his business went bust. But the pressure of keeping a secret at school, and living in uncomfortable accommodation, with little money and privacy, leads to problems for Amanda and her family. Amanda struggles with the idea of telling her new friends she is homeless but decides to take the plunge reveal the truth about her situation. |
| 3. Sagal | 18 March 2009 | 18.00 | BBC1 | Wednesday follows Sagal, an 11-year-old originally from Somalia. She lives in a flat in temporary accommodation with her mother and her lively three-year-old brother who rules the roost. Sagal is very private and has told almost no one that she is homeless. She is keen to do well in school and has aspirations to be a doctor. |
| 4. Mel | 19 March 2009 | 18.00 | BBC1 | Mel, 13, lives with her family and as one of the older children at the charity Save the Family’s sheltered housing project, she has become an unexpected role model for the other children who live there. During this penultimate episode Mel becomes a roving reporter for the series and finds out how Save the Family works. At a fundraising event she interviews former Conservative Leader Iain Duncan Smith. |
| 5. The Sofa Surfers | 20 March 2009 | 18.00 | BBC1 | The series rounds off when all the families meet together for the first time for a weekend of celebration at Save the Family Wales, there are tears, tantrums and even a little romance… |

== Awards ==
It was Rose d'Or nominated in 2010 was nominated for the Social Award at the Rose d'Or Awards.

The International Documentary Association listed Sofa Surfers in their notable awards round up.

== Reception ==
This series received wide recognition for challenging perceptions around childhood homelessness. The Daily Mirror described it as "Shocking story of homeless family." It went on to say "this heart-breaking five-part BBC documentary series Sofa Surfers...explores child homelessness for other youngsters.”

The Daily Post described it as a “touching tale of a homeless child who finds refuge at a Flintshire safe-haven.” Tim McLachlan, Save the Family chief executive, said: “We saw Sofa Surfers as an excellent opportunity to enlighten young people about homelessness and how it can touch anybody of any age.”

The series was covered by The Guardian’s Louise Carpenter, who wrote “for every statistic, or non-statistic, there is a real child who is trying to cope. It is because of this that Billy-Jo and the children and three other families agreed to feature in a BBC five-part documentary series, Sofa Surfers, about child homelessness, to be aired on CBBC next week - part of a homelessness season on CBBC aimed at breaking down prejudices, especially among children themselves. The series explores the day-to-day reality; the children's hopes, their dreams, their disappointments. But, more than anything else, it shows their bravery, a heartbreaking acceptance of circumstances over which they have no control.”
