= Monarch (film) =

2014 film by John Walsh

- Original British Cinema Poster
- Directed by: John Walsh
- Written by: John Walsh
- Produced by: John Walsh
- Starring: T. P. McKenna; Jean Marsh; James Coombes; Peter Miles; Peter Sowerbutts
- Cinematography: Ray Andrew
- Production company: Walsh Bros Ltd.
- Distributed by: FremantleMedia; 3DD Productions
- Release dates: 8 October 2000 (MVFF); 14 August 2014 (United Kingdom)
- Running time: 89 minutes
- Country: United Kingdom
- Language: English

Monarch is a British costume drama involving Henry VIII. It was written and directed by John Walsh and released in 2000 at the Mill Valley Film Festival. It was re-released in 2014 after the film negative, thought lost, was rediscovered.

== Plot ==
Monarch is part fact, part fiction and unfolds around one night in the life of a hated king susceptible to assassination, and paranoid with the thought of his own mortality. The film is set in just one night when the injured Henry VIII arrives at a manor house closed for the season. Henry is without the power of his throne. He is vulnerable to those around him and to his own mental issues. He had left England financially and morally bankrupt; his collection of enemies became his only constant. A voiceover at the end claims that when Mary Tudor came to the throne, she had her father's remains exhumed and burned as a heretic. There is no evidence that this is true.

In an Irish Post interview, Walsh said “Often you can find out more about someone in a small time frame rather than you can if the two-hour film spans their whole life. Most bio-pics become little more than a montage of facts. If you confine a character to that time frame you can find out more about them.”

== Cast ==
- T. P. McKenna as Henry VIII
- Jean Marsh as The Queens, an amalgamation of his ex-wives.
- James Coombes as Thorn, the King's personal protection guard.
- Peter Miles as a courtier to King Henry.

== Production ==
It was shot on 35mm Kodak 5287 stock using Arriflex cameras. Principal photography commenced in October 1996 at Charlton House in south London, making it the only film about Henry VIII entirely shot in the borough where he was born: Greenwich. This Jacobean building served as the main location, with filming taking place inside and outside the house. The gardens were the backdrop for the opening title sequence. The Grand Salon and the Long Gallery featured heavily for the film's dramatic scenes with Henry VIII. The house's clock tower was also utilised as the hiding place for Will, the ground-keeper's son, who hid from men who break into the house. Although set at night much of the filming took place during the day; black drapes were hung outside of the building to create a night effect.

In an interview with newspaper The Greenwich Visitor (page 5), Walsh discussed how he wanted his depiction of Henry VIII to be more grounded and less like those portrayals from Hollywood. He also discussed the difficulty of filming on a location and how the film benefited from using 35mm Kodak film stock.

== Re-release ==
In 2014 a remastered version of Monarch was released following discovery of the original film negative, previously thought lost. The remastered version premiered on 14 September 2014 at London's Tricycle Theatre. Walsh discussed the issues around finding the lost negatives for Monarch and other lost projects with BBC Radio 2's Janice Long.

=== Restoration ===
Restoration was completed at Premier. The film scanning and restoration team worked closely with director John Walsh, re-mastering from the original 35mm colour camera negative after it was discovered in a vault 14 years after it was originally filmed. In an interview about the project for the BBC, John Walsh explained:

"When we located the project we found more than we bargained for with over 52 cans of various footage from film trims, cutting copies and work prints. We didn't know if the original camera negative would be amongst all of this haul. After a close examination we were delighted to find all of the original camera negative was there and in good shape for its age."

Every frame of film was scanned in high definition at Premier and had more than 10,000 particles removed by hand by the restoration team. A new sound mix was also created from the original elements in Premier's in-house audio department. In an article with The Weekender in November 2017 John discussed the importance restoration and preservation of older films to future-protect film such as Monarch:

"It will give today’s audiences the chance to see the wonderful performance of Jean Marsh and the towering presence of T. P. McKenna, regarded as one of the greats of his generation and rightly so in one of his most outstanding performances. ...
Some films are lost for all time. From Alfred Hitchcock films to TV episodes of Doctor Who and Tony Hancock. The Holy Grail of lost films for collectors is London After Midnight. The 1927 silent horror- mystery film starring Lon Chaney and produced by MGM has not been seen for almost 50 years.”

== Reception ==
The film received strong reviews on its re-release in 2014 which were in contrast with a poor review in 2000. In 2000 Dennis Harvey wrote in Variety that "Monarch plays out an OK premise to results at once turgid and ridiculous." and describes McKenna's performance as "hammy". In 2014 the Radio Times film critic Jeremy Aspinall called it "a fascinating, haunting little gem, with a richly nuanced performance from McKenna". The film's realistic approach was noted by the BBFC who certified it a 15 on the basis that it "contains strong bloody violence".

=== Home media ===
Monarch was released for the first time on DVD on 7 April 2014 by FremantleMedia. It included extras on the making of the film and the restoration process. A high-definition version is also available to view on iTunes.

DVD Compare said "The film features an extraordinary British cast, is well written, and is perfectly paced." The Movie Waffler gave the film four stars for the main feature and four stars for the DVD extras, saying “McKenna is the beating heart of Monarch, part wounded bear, part Augustus Gloop petulance.” It adds “This menacingly pessimistic view of British history and government is an immensely entertaining gothic melodrama, the creepy details that Walsh weaves into the film.”
