= Flash Gordon: The Official Story of the Film =

2020 non-fiction book by John Walsh

- Author: John Walsh
- Language: English
- Genre: Fantasy film
- Publisher: Titan Books
- Publication date: November 27, 2020
- Publication place: United Kingdom
- Media type: Print (hardcover)
- Pages: 192 (first edition, hardcover)
- ISBN: 9781789095067 (first edition, hardcover)

Flash Gordon: The Official Story of the Film is a book by John Walsh published on November 27, 2020. This is a behind the scenes look at the making of the film Flash Gordon from 1980.

== Overview ==
The book features new interviews with cast and creative, including stars Sam J. Jones and Brian Blessed and director Mike Hodges, who wrote the foreword, as well as behind-the-scenes photography.

John Walsh, film-maker and author, retrieved about 40 designs for director Nicolas Roeg's unmade version of the film from the British Film Institute archives. In an interview with Dalya Alberge of The Observer, Walsh describes the unseen materials from who attempted the make the film in the late 1970s: "It's public knowledge that Roeg worked on the film’s development. What hasn't been seen is its artwork".

Forbidden Planet TV's Andrew Sumner interviewed Walsh about the task of tracking down the missing images for the book and why it has taken so long for the film to receive its new status as a cult classic.

In an interview with The Book of Man, Walsh described the difficulty of getting this book agreed for publication: "For years my publisher and many others had tried and failed to secure the rights to get a book about the making of the film published. I was warned by a friend who worked in as an attorney in Hollywood that the rights for the project were a hornet's nest. For eight months, I worked with the various rights holders and along the way, uncovered another uncomfortable truth. Even if I can secure the rights to pen this making-of book, there are very few images that will help tell the story or convince readers it is worth shelling out £35.00".

== Reception ==
Walsh was interviewed by Josh Weiss at Syfy Wire.

BBC Online’s Nicholas Barber discussed with Walsh the appeal of the film.

Den of Geek's Kirsten Howard asked Walsh what the most surprising revelation he discovered writing the book: "There were two big moments. The first was when I discovered there had been an entirely different film planned – and we got the artwork, it's in the book. Then, I found out that the film was supposed to have an entirely different ending".

In 2021 the book was nominated as Book for the Year for the Rondo Hatton Classic Horror Awards.
