= ToryBoy The Movie =

- Theatrical release poster
- Directed by: John Walsh
- Produced by: Roger James
- Production company: Walsh Bros Ltd.
- Distributed by: Fremantle Media; 3DD Productions
- Release date: 11 May 2011
- Running time: 100 minutes
- Country: United Kingdom
- Language: English

ToryBoy The Movie is a 2011 gonzo-style British documentary feature film directed by and starring John Walsh. It follows Walsh as he becomes a political candidate for the Conservative Party in the Yorkshire constituency of Middlesbrough.

== Background ==
A staunch Labour Party supporter all his life, Walsh had become disillusioned with the party. When David Cameron opened the door to allow non party members to run for the Conservative candidacy ahead of the 2010 general election, John Walsh decided to do just that and document his experiences on camera. He came third in the election; Stuart Bell remained the MP for Middlesbrough, but the Conservative share of the vote increased to 18.8 per cent.

== The film ==
The film was based on the 72 hours of footage made by Walsh on the campaign trail. It made the case that Labour's Stuart Bell should not be the Member of Parliament (MP) of Middlesbrough, as Bell – who had been the MP since 1983 – was absent so often from Middlesbrough that he would be an unsuitable candidate. Walsh showed the finished film in a free showing a year after the election. On the Who Can I vote For? website, Walsh gives a humorous warning: "this film contains strong language throughout and scenes of politicians that some viewers may find offensive".

Walsh paid homage to the great title designer Saul Bass and recreated his angular animations to create a fresh approach to telling this story. According to The White Balance (the animation studio that Walsh worked with), "This mad cap comedy best captured the visual style and the transition of the film was making from a serious expose of the political shenanigans in the North East, to a political satire."

Interviewed for Benjamin Glass' blog published by the Digital Journal in April 2011 before its release, Walsh said that he took a risk making this film: "For something like this, an investigative film, there will be some who think that I have exceeded my brief as a candidate. I would say that it is right to look at injustice and in this country people have died so that we may all have the right to question those in authority and those in public office." When it premiered in London in May 2011, The Northern Echo reported Walsh's suggestion that the film might force a by-election as a result of its findings. Walsh said he had been serious about becoming an MP and had self-funded his £15,000 election campaign. "When I got to Middlesbrough I found a town that politics had forgotten and a MP who was there in name only, a truly depressingly affair.”

A screening at the Frontline Club took place on 22 November 2011 followed by a Q&A with John Walsh.

In 2018, in a podcast interview with BritFlicks, Walsh talked about the difficulties in making the film.

== Critical reception ==
In 2011 the film was nominated for the Grierson Awards for "Best Documentary on a Contemporary Theme".

The Radio Times film review by Jeremy Aspinall on the film's re-release gave it four stars, and called it "A revealing and droll fly-on-the-wall documentary. It's a fascinating odyssey illuminated by pithily informative animations. Who would have thought politics could be so entertaining?". The Irish Post said Walsh's "documentary about a rookie Conservative candidate aimed to provide an insight into British political culture, and in doing so uncovered the next big political scandal."

According to Richard Moss, the BBC's North East & Cumbria Political editor, "some silliness aside, it is a thought-provoking insight into the way our political system works or doesn't work on the ground... But I'm not sure he quite nails down a case against Stuart Bell.. And John Walsh doesn't help his case with some of the content in the film." Liberal Democrat commentator Mark Pack wrote on his blog that "John Walsh portrays life on the campaign trail as it really is. It is a hugely enjoyable documentary, which mixes humour, drama and education". Samuel Scott from review site DVD Compare gave it a B− and wrote "I found this documentary very intriguing and very honest. John is a very likable character, and I wouldn't hesitate in voting for someone with so much passion for a second."

Doc Geeks commented that the film was "a blunt exposé combined with a tinge of lightheartedness. Satirical animation cleverly frames Britain in its political context". On his blog, novelist Christopher Fowler wrote that ToryBoy The Movie was "a snapshot of our country's political apathy in microcosm. It's heartbreaking to see people blindly supporting their own demise as if they're playing some kind of long game they'll probably never live to see the outcome of. Oh, and it's also very funny."

When the DVD was released Ben Kamal interviewed Walsh for the Aberdeen student newspaper The Gaudie, and wrote "I was prepared for some careful sneering in the interview and subsequent write-up. This did not (and could not) transpire: firstly because of the film, which comes across as Frank Capra scripted by Evelyn Waugh; secondly because of Walsh himself. He is warm, patient and generous, to my own shock I liked him and if you watch the film you'll like him too."

The Northern Echo article by Lucy Richardson says “at the pre-election hustings, where Sir Stuart does not make an appearance, he tells voters that he will have Sir Stuart jailed before Christmas if elected.”

Two years after the film release, Lord Michael Ashcroft wrote on his blog: "I'd defy anyone with an interest in politics not to enjoy this film". He went on to say that "despite the zany tone of the film, it also has a hard-hitting message which questions whether one MP in his safe seat, and perhaps other MPs in similar situations, do enough to justify their salary and expenses."

== Controversy ==
Four months after the release of the film, and not mentioning it, local newspaper Teesside Gazette asked "Are Teessiders getting enough from Sir Stuart Bell?" when he failed to answer over 100 telephone calls made to his constituency office. The Gazette story, which followed complaints from locals, was picked up by national newspapers. The Independent asked "is Sir Stuart Bell Britain's laziest MP?" In 2011 The Guardian fact-checked the "laziest MP" claim and found it incorrect: based on attendance at votes, the "laziest" MP was Roger Godsiff, and that, excluding frontbenchers, speakers and their deputies, and Northern Irish MPs, Bell had the 10th worst attendance record with a 65.4% absence rate. (Bell had stopped holding surgeries after an assault in 1997.) The Labour Party said it would be totally unacceptable if constituents had been unable to contact their MP.

In 2015, when the film was re-released, a showing in Middlesbrough by Teesside University was cancelled to avoid breaching union rules on political neutrality in the run up to the general election. According an interview with Walsh in the Teesside Gazette, the film was booked in by the Student Union, but at the last minute the screening was halted. "I think it's a shame really," said Walsh. "It's a unique opportunity for students to hold me to account." Teesside Free Education Campaign activists, writing on the website of the National Campaign Against Fees and Cuts, mentioned the union cancelling the film: "A few weeks after the student elections, a planned screening of the film Tory Boy, made by the 2010 Tory candidate for Middlesbrough about his experience standing in the area was cancelled, despite having been screened at schools and colleges up and down the country without controversy." The North Crowd, a website produced as part of a student project at the university, featured an interview with John Walsh website and images of the print work that was created by the Student Union to advertise the screening.

== Re-releases ==
The film received a re-release in cinemas in 2015 in the lead up to the 2015 general election.

A community cinema screening was held in Hither Green, including a Q&A with Walsh.

== Soundtrack ==
The film used older film cues from films across the last six decades to create a unique soundscape. Radio Times described it as "a fascinating odyssey illuminated by pithily informative animations and music from films like It's a Mad, Mad, Mad, Mad World and Midnight Cowboy."

== Home media ==
ToryBoy The Movie was issued for the first time on DVD 1 October 2012 by FremantleMedia. It included extras on the making of the film and gave Stuart Bell a right of reply, where he denied the allegations levelled against him in the film. The film was also made available as a high definition download on Vimeo.

In July 2020 the film premiered on Amazon Prime in both the UK and the US.
