= Escape from New York: The Official Story of the Film =

2021 non-fiction book by John Walsh

Escape From New York The Official Story of the Film
- Author: John Walsh
- Language: English
- Genre: Fantasy film
- Publisher: Titan Books
- Publication date: December 14, 2021
- Publication place: United Kingdom
- Media type: Print (Hardcover)
- Pages: 160 (First edition, hardcover)
- ISBN: 9781789095067 (First edition, hardcover)

Escape From New York The Official Story of the Film is a book by John Walsh published December 14, 2021. This is a behind the scenes look at the making of the film Escape from New York from 1981.

== Overview ==
The book's publication was announced in April 2021. It was published in December and featured new interviews with cast and crew.

== Reception ==
Forbidden Planet TV’s Andrew Sumner, Josh Weiss at Syfy Wire and Variety interviewed Walsh about the book.

AIPT Comics’ review of the book summarised it as “a behind-the-scenes book worthy of Brain’s vast library" and a "unique glimpse into the inner workings of a Carpenter classic".

In 2022 the book was nominated as Book for the Year by the Rondo Hatton Classic Horror Awards
