= The Ray Harryhausen Awards =

Annual awards for animation

- Awarded for: Best animation films of previous year
- Presented by: The Ray and Diana Harryhausen Foundation
- First award: 2022
- Website: harryhausenawards.com

The Ray Harryhausen Awards are an annual film award for the best animated films of the previous year. Established by The Ray and Diana Harryhausen Foundation based in Edinburgh, the awards aim to recognise the achievements of contemporary animators, whilst celebrating the ongoing legacy of stop-motion animator Ray Harryhausen. The award statues are cast by Arch Bronze, who also sculpt the Laurence Olivier Awards. Awards were made in 2022, 2023 and 2024.

== Overview ==
The awards were originated by Foundation trustee John Walsh. They were announced at San Diego Comic Con 2021, with The Beat commenting that "...exciting things are happening at the Harryhausen Foundation, and the new film award announcement is sure to make an impact in the animation world." Walsh told the Puppet Place blog that he hoped that the awards would promote Ray's legacy alongside identifying new talent coming into the animation industry.

Ray Harryhausen's daughter Vanessa Harryhausen told Starburst Magazine that her father had always valued the educational value of his films, and hoped that the awards would continue to inspire new generations of artists. The winners of the inaugural awards ceremony were announced online on June 29th 2022, marking Ray Harryhausen's birthday. The first physical awards ceremony took place at The Cameo, Edinburgh on the same date in 2023, followed by a 60th anniversary screening of Jason and the Argonauts.

== Categories ==
Category	Year Awarded	Winners
Best Feature Film Animation	2022 2023 2024	Mad God (2021, Director Phil Tippett) Pinocchio (2022, Directors Guillermo del Toro & Mark Gustafson) The Inventor (2023, Director Jim Capobianco)
The Spirit of Harryhausen Award	2023 2024	Epic Tails (2022, Tat Productions) The Primevals (2024, Director David Allen
Best Short Film Animation	2022 2023 2024	Only a Child (2021, Director Simone Giampaolo) Puppet Story (2022, Director Park Se Hong) A Bear Named Wojtek (2023, Director Ian Gardner)
Best Commercial Film Animation	2022	Save Ralph (2021, Arch Model Studio)
Best Television Animation	2022	Scream Street 2.12 'The Noisy Place' (Factory)
Best Student Film Animation	2022 2023 2024	Absolution Parsin (2022, Director Jack Nop) Provisions (2022, Director Kehyal Roy-Meighoo) Seaglass (2024, Director Cheryl Blake)
Best Children's Film Animation	2022 2023 2024	Battle of Gastropoda (2022, Director Kristian Harding) The Speech of Txai Surui (2023) Joint winners: Heroic Quest (2024, Director: Benjamin Holmes), & Sandra v/s Vivora (2024,Director Lisa Holmes)
Honorary Award	2022	John Walsh
Harryhausen Hall of Fame Award	2022 2023 2024	Phil Tippett Janet Stevens Bridget Appleby
