= Farewell, My Odin =

Japanese manga series

- First tankōbon volume cover

オーディンの舟葬 (Odin no Shūsō)
- Genre: Action; Historical; Thriller
- Manga
- Written by: Chihiro Yoshioka
- Published by: Coamix
- English publisher: NA: Titan Manga
- Imprint: Zenon Comics
- Magazine: Monthly Comic Zenon
- Original run: June 23, 2023 – October 25, 2024
- Volumes: 3

Farewell, My Odin (Japanese: オーディンの舟葬, Hepburn: Odin no Shūsō; "The Boat Burial of Odin") is a Japanese manga series written and illustrated by Chihiro Yoshioka. It was serialized in Coamix's seinen manga magazine Monthly Comic Zenon between June 2023 and October 2024, with its chapters collected in three tankōbon volumes.

== Publication ==
Written and illustrated by Chihiro Yoshioka, Farewell, My Odin was serialized in Coamix's seinen manga magazine Monthly Comic Zenon from June 23, 2023, to October 25, 2024. (Note: It started serialization in the magazine's August issue of 2023, which was released on June 23.) Coamix collected its chapters in three tankōbon volumes, released from November 20, 2023, to December 20, 2024.

In July 2024, Titan Manga announced that they had licensed the manga for English release in North America, starting on February 25, 2025.

=== Volumes ===
No.	Original release date	Original ISBN	English release date	English ISBN
1	November 20, 2023	978-4-86-720584-6	February 25, 2025	978-1-78-774439-4
2	May 20, 2024	978-4-86-720643-0	May 19, 2026	978-1-78-774888-0
3	December 20, 2024	978-4-86-720718-5	—	—

== Reception ==
The series was recommended by Vinland Saga manga author Makoto Yukimura, with a comment featured on the obi of the first volume.
