= Don't Make Me Angry =

- Television poster
- Directed by: John Walsh
- Narrated by: Ray Burdis
- Country of origin: United Kingdom
- Original language: English

Production
- Executive producer: Roger James
- Producer: John Walsh
- Running time: 8 x 30 min.
- Production company: Walsh Bros Ltd.

Original release
- Release: November 11, 2005

Don't Make Me Angry is a British documentary series for the Channel Four by John Walsh of Walsh Bros Ltd. Each episode featured a story of anger and how its triggers and results were stopping the teenagers and their families from having a normal life. It is shot in an observational documentary style. The psychologist Rachel Andrew has appeared on it.

== Episodes Series One ==
There have been 5 screenings of this series on Channel Four from 2005 to 2009 below are the details for the first UK transmissions.

Episode	Date	Time	Channel	Description
1. Scott	14 November 2005	10.45	Channel 4	In the first of a four-part series, Dr Rachel Andrew helps teenagers with the problems caused by their anger. Unemployed 16-year-old Scott, is in need of help, before it's too late and his fears of prison become reality. With Dr Rachel's tuition, can Scott turn his life around before his mother reaches the end of her tether?
2. Charelle	15 November 2005	10.45	Channel 4	In the second programme of this four-part series, Dr Rachel Andrew helps teenagers with the problems caused by their anger. 16 year old Cherelle had everything going for her, until she was disillusioned at the end of school, and let her anger get in the way of her career path, rather than putting her ambitions into action. With the guidance of Dr Rachel Andrew, will she put in the hard work and find the inspiration she needs? Will this quell her anger?
3. Barney	16 November 2005	10.45	Channel 4	In the third programme of this four-part series, Dr Rachel Andrew helps teenagers with the problems caused by their anger. Barney is a 15-year-old boy stuck in a dismal routine. His anger has isolated him and his family from the outside world. Failing at school and finding his only entertainment in TV and computer games, his anger rules the family life while his parents buy him whatever he wants to stop the furious, sometimes violent outbursts. With the help of Dr Rachel Andrew, can Barney start to control his anger and change his future?
4. Jenny	18 November 2005	11.10	Channel 4	In the final programme of this four-part series, Dr Rachel Andrew helps teenagers with the problems caused by their anger. Starving for attention, 15-year-old Jenny gets angry at the smallest thing. Many of her outbursts could be dismissed as typical teenage angst but there is a worrying aspect to her behaviour. Jenny has written over a hundred highly charged and emotional letters, some making threats of self harm. While her dad copes by spending money on her, he also finds time to shop for himself, finding an Internet bride from Russia, but will this destroy the home life Jenny tries to control? Dr Rachel Andrew comes to the rescue to help the family tackle issues they tend to avoid.

== Episodes Series Two ==
There have been 10 screenings of this series on Channel 4 from 2006 to 2009 below are the details for the first UK transmissions.

Episode	Date	Time	Channel	Description
1. Lisa	16 October 2006	10.30	Channel 4	Lisa has suffered from outbursts of anger since her parents separated about five years ago. Her parents find her impossible to control and often ask Lisa to move out. This only fuels her anger. She has a younger sister, Jessica, 13, and younger brother, Harry, 18 months. Lisa's anger causes her many problems. She finds keeping friends difficult, she's abusive towards her family, is continuously getting into trouble with the police and has already been thrown out of two schools. If she doesn't manage to start controlling her anger, she fears that she'll get thrown out of her dance college and won't be able to fulfil her dream of becoming a successful west-end dancer. She also wants to forge better relations with her family, especially her little sister and to generally change other people's perception of her as a troublemaker. If she can control her anger, she thinks she'll be able to become a better person.
2. Jamie	17 October 2006	10.30	Channel 4	Jamie lives with his parents and younger sister, Emily, 14, in the quiet seaside town of Clevedon. Jamie's anger began when he started middle school and found it difficult to make friends. Naturally a loner, Jamie couldn't understand why the other pupils didn't want to learn and he was dubbed a "keeno" and subsequently bullied. The bullying eventually got too much and he was forced to leave school, shortly before he was due to take his GCSEs. Jamie suffers from a cocktail of depression, anxiety and most notably, anger. His anger outbursts have become extremely violent and tend to be towards his dad. On one occasion threatening him with a knife. If Jamie doesn't begin to control his anger, he fears that he could end up killing someone. He wants to go to college to study computer programming, but if he can't deal with his anger, this is unlikely to happen which could jeopardise his dream of becoming a computer games programmer.
3. Mikki	18 October 2006	10.30	Channel 4	Mikki lives on a tough council-estate in Edmonton and is the sole carer of her terminally ill mum. With little help from her two sisters and dad, the responsibility of care is often the cause of Mikki's anger. Mum finds Mikki physically intimidating and without the support of Mikki's father, finds it difficult to discipline her. The biggest area of contention is Mikki's truancy, for which mum has been taken to court over. Mikki refuses to go to school and mum has now resigned herself to home-schooling, but as Mikki spends all night on the internet and sleeps all day, this isn't working.If Mikki doesn't control her anger and start listening to her mum, she's worried that she won't get an education and won't be able to get a job of choice, which may be something to do with sports psychology. She also wants to be a professional football player, but if she can't control her anger, no team will take her on.
4. Michael	19 October 2006	10.30	Channel 4	Michael lives in the leafy suburbs of Sunbury-on-Thames

== Awards ==
In 2006 the series was nominated for a BAFTA in the Childrens Learning - Secondary category.

Series two won the World Medal Young Adult Special at the New York Television Festival Awards.
