= Enough with This Slow Life! I Was Reincarnated as a High Elf and Now I'm Bored =

Japanese light novel series

- First light novel volume cover

転生してハイエルフになりましたが、スローライフは120年で飽きました (Tensei Shite Haierufu ni Narimashita ga, Surōraifu wa 120-nen de Akimashita)
- Genre: Fantasy
- Novel series
- Written by: rarutori
- Published by: Shōsetsuka ni Narō
- Original run: October 13, 2020 – May 15, 2023
- Light novel
- Written by: rarutori
- Illustrated by: Ciavis
- Published by: Earth Star Entertainment
- English publisher: NA: J-Novel Club
- Imprint: Earth Star Novel
- Original run: April 15, 2021 – May 15, 2023
- Volumes: 8
- Manga

High Elf with a Long Life
- Written by: rarutori
- Illustrated by: Kō Narita
- Published by: Earth Star Entertainment
- English publisher: NA: Titan Comics
- Imprint: Earth Star Comics
- Magazine: Comic Earth Star
- Original run: June 10, 2021 – present
- Volumes: 10

Enough with This Slow Life! I Was Reincarnated as a High Elf and Now I'm Bored (転生してハイエルフになりましたが、スローライフは120年で飽きました, Tensei Shite Haierufu ni Narimashita ga, Surōraifu wa 120-nen de Akimashita) is a Japanese light novel series written by rarutori and illustrated by Ciavis. It was initially serialized as a web novel on Shōsetsuka ni Narō from October 2020 to May 2023. It was later acquired by Earth Star Entertainment who published eight volumes under their Earth Star Novel imprint from April 2021 to May 2023. A manga adaptation illustrated by Kō Narita began serialization on Earth Star Entertainment's Comic Earth Star in June 2021.

== Synopsis ==
After living 120 years of his life in the Great Pulha Woodlands, Acer remembers his past life as a human and suddenly declares that he is tired of his peaceful elven life and goes on an adventure to seek a new life.

== Media ==
=== Light novel ===
Written by rarutori, Enough with This Slow Life! I Was Reincarnated as a High Elf and Now I'm Bored was initially serialized as a web novel on Shōsetsuka ni Narō from October 13, 2020 to May 15, 2023. It was later acquired by Earth Star Entertainment who released eight volumes with illustrations by Ciavis under their Earth Star Novel light novel imprint from April 15, 2021 to May 15, 2023.

During their Anime NYC 2022 panel, J-Novel Club announced that they licensed the series.

No.	Original release date	Original ISBN	North American release date	North American ISBN
1	April 15, 2021	978-4-8030-1511-9	February 28, 2023	978-1-7183-2434-3
1. "The Damned Elf and the Damned Dwarf"; 2. "The High Elf and the Sword Princess"; 3. "The Sea, the Fishermen, and the Sailors"; 4. "A Traveler's Whims"; 5. "The Blacksmith and the Mage, Birds of a Feather"; Excerpt: "Dripping Memories"; Side stories: "Fragments of Meeting"; Side story: "The Creation Game"
2	July 15, 2021	978-4-8030-1542-3	May 30, 2023	978-1-7183-2436-7
1. "High, Half, and the City of Wheat"; 2. "The Curse No Sword Can Cut"; 3. "My Master and His Master"; 4. "A Bloodthirsty Creature in the City of Snow"; 5. "Elves and Dwarves"; Excerpt: "Dripping Memories"; Side stories: "Fragments of Meeting"; Side story: "Thirty Minutes in the Morning"
3	October 15, 2021	978-4-8030-1570-6	September 1, 2023	978-1-7183-2438-1
1. "Goodbye"; 2. Interlude: "Kaeha's Letter"; 3. "Yet I Will Still Walk On"; 4. "The Guides of Wind and Fire"; 5. "The Great Distant Empire: Part One"; 6. "The Great Distant Empire: Part Two"; Excerpt: "Dripping Memories"; Side stories: "Fragments of Meeting"; Side story: "The Creation Game: The Races of Creation"
4	January 15, 2022	978-4-8030-1603-1	December 12, 2023	978-1-7183-2440-4
1. "Above the Cloud-Scraping Tree"; 2. "The Blue Road Home"; 3. "Changing and Unchanging, Part One"; 4. "Changing and Unchanging, Part Two"; Excerpt: "Dripping Memories"; Side stories: "Fragments of Meeting"; Side story: "The Feelings Carried in a Sword"
5	May 17, 2022	978-4-8030-1644-4	February 19, 2024	978-1-7183-2442-8
1. "What Was Inherited"; 2. "The Forest Depths"; 3. "Travel, and the Usual Whimsy"; 4. "The City of Shining Stone"; 5. "To Build Something New"; 6. "Chaos in the West"; Excerpts: "Dripping Memories"; Side stories: "Fragments of Meeting"
6	September 15, 2022	978-4-8030-1692-5	May 10, 2024	978-1-7183-2444-2
1. "The Kingdom of Elves"; 2. "The Road Forward"; 3. "The Monstrous and the Truly Monstrous"; 4. "King of the Dwarves"; 5. "The World Seen from above the Clouds"; Excerpt: "Dripping Memories"; Side stories: "Fragments of Meeting"
7	January 16, 2023	978-4-8030-1738-0	August 12, 2024	978-1-7183-2446-6
1. "The Sudden End of the World"; 2. "Execution"; 3. "The Flower of the Sun Blooming in the West"; 4. "The Flower of the Sun Blooming in the East"; 5. "Beyond the Sea"; Excerpt: "Dripping Memories"; Side stories: "Fragments of Meeting"
8	May 15, 2023	978-4-8030-1787-8	October 25, 2024	978-1-7183-2448-0
1. "A Journey That Gained Nothing, Gave Nothing, Yet Left Something Behind"; 2. "The Person Best with Money"; 3. "The Flow of Time and Good Drink"; 4. Epilogue; Excerpt: "Dripping Memories"; Side stories: "Fragments of Meeting"; After story: "A Possible Future"

=== Manga ===
A manga adaptation illustrated by Kō Narita began serialization in Earth Star Entertainment's Comic Earth Star website on June 10, 2021. The manga's chapters have been collected in ten tankōbon volumes as of July 2026.

In December 2025, Titan Comics announced that they had licensed the manga, under the title High Elf with a Long Life, for English publication initially set for June 2026.

No.	Original release date	Original ISBN	English release date	English ISBN
1	January 12, 2022	978-4-8030-1600-0	August 11, 2026	978-1-78774-908-5
Chapters 1–5
2	July 12, 2022	978-4-8030-1659-8	December 15, 2026	978-1-78774-909-2
3	January 12, 2023	978-4-8030-1730-4	—	—
4	July 12, 2023	978-4-8030-1807-3	—	—
5	January 12, 2024	9784-8030-1893-6	—	—
6	July 12, 2024	978-4-8030-1976-6	—	—
7	January 10, 2025	978-4-8030-2060-1	—	—
8	July 11, 2025	978-4-8030-2149-3	—	—
9	January 9, 2026	978-4-8030-2247-6	—	—
10	July 10, 2026	978-4-8030-2336-7	—	—
