= Scavengers Another Sky =

Japanese manga series

- First tankōbon volume cover

スカベンジャーズアナザースカイ (Sukabenjāzu Anazā Sukai)
- Genre: Action; Dystopian; Science fiction
- Manga
- Written by: Ryō Furube
- Published by: Akita Shoten
- English publisher: NA: Titan Comics
- Imprint: Young Champion Comics
- Magazine: Young Champion Retsu
- Original run: September 20, 2022 – present
- Volumes: 7

Scavengers Another Sky (スカベンジャーズアナザースカイ, Sukabenjāzu Anazā Sukai) is a Japanese manga series written and illustrated by Ryō Furube. It was originally published as a one-shot in Akita Shoten's seinen manga magazine Young Champion Retsu in July 2022. It later began serialization in the same magazine in September 2022.

== Synopsis ==
The series is centered around a group of girls named "Scavengers" who are deployed from a facility known as the "Bus Stop" into another dimension called the Black Parade to take down monsters. The girls go on these missions in order to become rich and regain their freedom from the facility.

== Publication ==
Written and illustrated by Ryō Furube, Scavengers Another Sky was originally published as a one-shot in Akita Shoten's seinen manga magazine Young Champion Retsu on July 19, 2022. It later began serialization in the same magazine on September 20 later that year. Its chapters have been compiled into seven tankōbon volumes as of October 2026. The series is licensed in English by Titan Comics under their Titan Manga imprint.

No.	Original release date	Original ISBN	North American release date	North American ISBN
1	May 18, 2023	978-4-253-25781-7	January 27, 2026	978-1-787-74740-1
1. "Scavengers"; 2. "Dispatched Patrol to BP-27 1"; 3. "Dispatched Patrol to BP-27 2"; 4. "Dispatched Patrol to BP-27 3"; 5. "Dispatched Patrol to BP-27 4"; 6. "Big Game 1"; 7. "Big Game 2"; 8. "Another Sky"
2	January 18, 2024	978-4-253-25782-4	June 9, 2026	978-1-787-74741-8
9. "Area-Wide Dispatched Patrol"; 10. "R.I.F. in BP-11 1"; 11. "R.I.F. in BP-11 2"; 12. "R.I.F. in BP-11 3"; 13. "R.I.F. in BP-11 4"; 14. "R.I.F. in BP-11 5"; 15. "R.I.F. in BP-11 6"
3	August 20, 2024	978-4-253-25783-1	—	—
4	March 18, 2025	978-4-253-25784-8	—	—
5	September 19, 2025	978-4-253-00413-8	—	—
6	April 20, 2026	978-4-253-01310-9	—	—
7	October 20, 2026	978-4-253-02032-9	—	—
