= Sanjuro (martial art) =

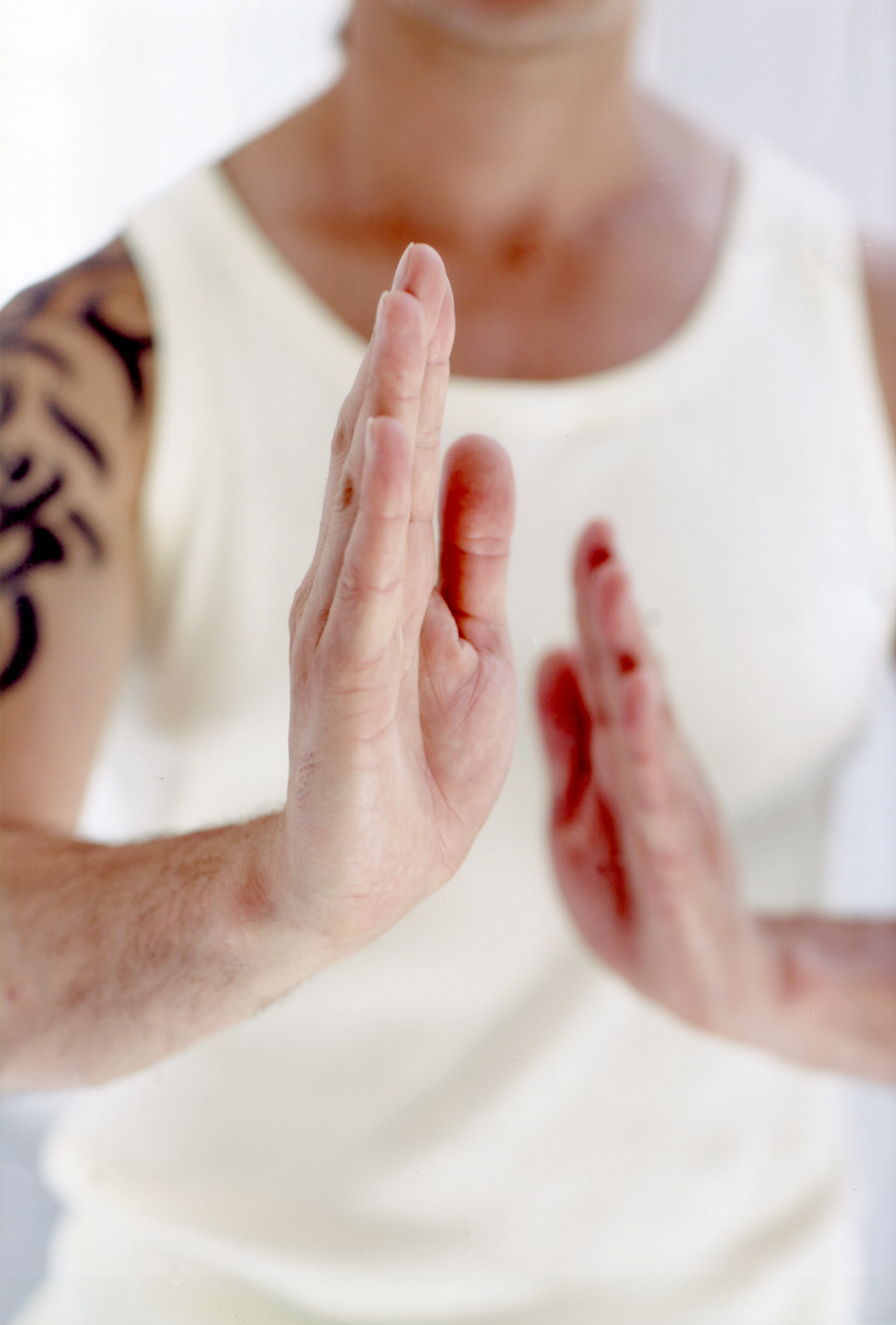
Sanjuro Founder Glenn Delikan

Sanjuro is a hybrid martial art, fusing elements of a variety of martial arts styles, sparring, and dance

== Etymology ==
The use of the name Sanjuro is a reference to the iconic film by Akira Kurosawa.

== Training ==
Sanjuro classes are taught in mixed ability groups, both formal grading and uniform optional. DanceCombat classes are also run, offering an emphasis on form, fitness, and flexibility.

The Sanjuro grading system is externally validated by AQA.

== Sanjuro and Special Educational Needs ==
Sanjuro Martial Arts training is employed in teaching children and adults with a range of special educational needs and disabilities, including partial sight and blindness, autism, and a variety of other physical and learning difficulties.

In the BBC Two programme, My Life: Karate Kids, three disabled students of Sanjuro are featured learning the martial art as a technique to gain better control of their bodies.

In September 2013, Jackie Chan's charity, The Dragon's Heart Foundation, funded a 12-month programme in Tottenham, London, citing Sanjuro's emphasis on encouraging confidence and safety above violence.

== Notable practitioners ==
Sanjuro is practiced by a number of actors and other professionals in the creative sector including:

- Haruka Kuroda, UK-based Japanese actress
- Alexander Dreymon, German-born actor
