= Welcome to Ghost Mansion =

Japanese manga series

- First tankōbon volume cover

訳アリ心霊マンション (Wakeari Shinrei Manshon)
- Genre: Comedy horror; Supernatural
- Manga
- Written by: Nebukuro
- Published by: Shinchosha
- English publisher: NA: Titan Manga
- Imprint: Bunch Comics
- Magazine: Kurage Bunch
- Original run: May 13, 2022 – present
- Volumes: 7

Welcome to Ghost Mansion (Japanese: 訳アリ心霊マンション, Hepburn: Wakeari Shinrei Manshon) is a Japanese manga series written and illustrated by Nebukuro. It began serialization on Shinchosha's Kurage Bunch manga website in May 2022.

== Plot ==
Kaoru Shinonome decided to become a landlord and buy an apartment block, later she learns that the property is haunted, scaring potential tenants. In order to pay for her mortgage, she begins advertising the apartments to the ghosts and evil spirits she encounters.

== Media ==
=== Manga ===
Written and illustrated by Nebukuro, Welcome to Ghost Mansion began serialization on Shinchosha's Kurage Bunch manga website on May 13, 2022. Its chapters have been collected into seven tankōbon volumes as of May 2026. The series is licensed in English by Titan Comics under its Titan Manga imprint.

No.	Original release date	Original ISBN	North American release date	North American ISBN
1	October 7, 2022	978-4-10-772533-2	January 28, 2025	978-1-78-774370-0
1. "Biter"; 2. "Painter"; 3. "Jumper"; 4. "Crossroads 1"; 5. "Crossroads 2"; 6. "Fallacy 1"; 7. "Fallacy 2"; 8. "Countryside 1"; Bonus
2	May 9, 2023	978-4-10-772595-0	August 12, 2025	978-1-78-774371-7
9. "Countryside 2"; 10. "Countryside 3"; 11. "Countryside 4"; 12. "Lord of the Mountain"; 13. "Spirit Road"; 14. "Matryoshka 1"; 15. "Matryoshka 2"; 16. "Sanba Carnival"; 17. "Railroad Crossing"; Online Bonus Chapters 1–2
3	January 9, 2024	978-4-10-772674-2	September 29, 2026	978-1-78-774949-8
18. "Sibling Rivalry 1"; 19. "Sibling Rivalry 2"; 20. "Sibling Rivalry 3"; 21. "The River in the Summer"; 22. "The Intercom"; 23. "Urban Myth"; 24. "Spirit Grades"; 25. "The Death Floor 1"; 26. "The Death Floor 2"; Bonus
4	September 9, 2024	978-4-10-772746-6	December 30, 2026	978-1-80-618522-1
5	March 7, 2025	978-4-10-772807-4	—	—
6	October 9, 2025	978-4-10-772867-8	—	—
7	May 9, 2026	978-4-10-772940-8	—	—

=== Other ===
A collaborative music video with the Vtuber Shirakami Fubuki was announced on October 28, 2025.

== Reception ==
The series won the 17th KuraTwi Manga Award in 2021. The series was nominated for the Web Manga General Election 10th Anniversary Edition, and was ranked third, it was also nominated for the same award the following year and was ranked second. The series was nominated for the ninth Next Manga Awards in 2023, and was ranked fourth out of 61 nominees. It was also nominated for the eleventh edition in 2025 in the same category, and was ranked ninth.
