= Gladiator II: The Art and Making of the Ridley Scott Film =

- Author: John Walsh
- Language: English
- Genre: Film history
- Publisher: Abrams Books
- Publication date: 18 March 2025
- Publication place: United Kingdom
- Media type: Print (hardcover)
- Pages: 224
- ISBN: 9781419780165

Gladiator II: The Art and Making of the Ridley Scott Film is an official behind-the-scenes companion book written by British filmmaker John Walsh. Published by Abrams Books on March 18, 2025, it chronicles the production of the 2024 epic historical action film Gladiator II, directed by Ridley Scott and released by Paramount Pictures. The 224-page hardcover (with an ebook edition available) includes a foreword by Scott and approximately 500 full-color illustrations.

== Background and publication ==
Walsh, founder of Walsh Bros Ltd (a leading UK production company) and a trustee of the Ray and Diana Harryhausen Foundation, was commissioned by Abrams Books and Paramount Pictures to document the sequel. He is known for his series of official film companion books, including volumes on Conan the Barbarian, The Wicker Man, The Third Man, Harryhausen: The Lost Movies, Flash Gordon, and others.

The book was released in coffee table book hardcover format on March 18, 2025 (ISBN 978-1-4197-8016-5), priced at $50, with an ebook edition (ISBN 979-8-8870-7593-8) priced around $31.10. Promotion included a book signing event at Forbidden Planet's London Megastore on April 12, 2025, where Walsh signed copies and engaged with fans.

== Content ==
The book documents the film's recreation of ancient Rome through practical sets, costumes, special effects, and digital artistry. It highlights the challenges of scaling up the spectacle from the 2000 original while maintaining historical texture and cinematic ambition. It contains a foreword by Sir Ridley Scott, reflecting on the long development process (spanning over 25 years) and the importance of evolving the franchise. Interviews include cast members such as Paul Mescal (Lucius), Denzel Washington, Pedro Pascal, Connie Nielsen, as well as crew members such as production designers, armorers, costume designers (including Janty Yates), cinematographers, and visual effects teams. It reproduces Ridley Scott's hand-drawn "Ridleygrams" (preparatory storyboards by Scott himself), concept art, character and costume sketches, storyboards, unit photography from filming in Malta and Morocco, prop designs, set construction (e.g., Colosseum replicas), and ephemera. It also presents artistic inspirations drawn from 19th-century paintings by artists such as Jean-Léon Gérôme and Lawrence Alma-Tadema.

== Reception ==
The volume positions itself as the definitive insider's guide to the film's creative and technical achievements. Karen Woodham of Blazing Minds awarded it 5 out of 5 stars, calling it an "incredible hardback" and a "fascinating insight into the making of Gladiator II," adding: "If you’re a movie fan who enjoys behind-the-scenes insight, this book is a captivating read." Back to the Movies gave it 4 out of 5, describing it as a "hefty coffee-table addition that should lay proud amongst any film fans collection," and noting that it: "manages to strike the nice balance of visual spectacle and informed commentary." Starburst Magazine praised it as a "lavish treasure trove of images and info," particularly highlighting the design chapter for its "first-hand anecdotes that provide invaluable insight into the thought process behind the scenes." SciFiPulse emphasized its access and depth, stating that the book "packs a real punch, delivering a wealth of detail and insight that might just leave [readers] breathless," and describing it as providing "fascinating insights and... compelling stories from the major actors, writers, and producers involved in the project," with the foreword by Scott as a "standout feature." Yong How of Halcyon Realms praised its comprehensive scope and visuals, particularly the inclusion of "Ridleygrams".

== See also ==
- Gladiator
