= My Life: Karate Kids =

- Directed by: John Walsh
- Narrated by: David Tennant
- Country of origin: United Kingdom
- Original language: English

Production
- Executive producer: Roger James
- Producer: John Walsh
- Running time: 30 minutes
- Production company: Walsh Bros Ltd.

Original release
- Release: March 13, 2010

My Life: Karate Kids is a British documentary for the BBC by John Walsh of Walsh Bros Ltd. and was narrated by actor David Tennant. The film follows the friendship of two disabled children as they embark on learning Sanjuro Martial Arts and changing their lives forever. This film challenges the perceptions around childhood disability.

Sanjuro Martial Arts has its roots in traditional martial arts and a contemporary approach to teaching practical techniques that fit around the student’s abilities. Developed by Glenn Delikan, Sanjuro strives to make martial arts available to all ages and abilities, offering a glimpse of physical independence to kids who are otherwise totally reliant on carers. By charting the progress of the children over several months, Karate Kids reveals the friendship, bullying, confidence and self-worth of children in a north London school.

Buoyed by physical breakthroughs kick-started in Sanjuro class, one character in the series, Tim Choi, benefits even more than most. Tim has never been able to move or communicate unaided, and relies on mum and best friend Francis to communicate his thoughts to the outside world. Karate Kids follows him through a very busy few months. Tim receives a national award from disability charity Cerebra, then runs for Class President, and then has his life transformed as laser technology offers him a voice of his own and some glimmer of independence.

Adult mainstream class members featured in the footage for the documentary include actor Alexander Dreymon.

== Awards ==
The film was nominated for a BAFTA award in the Children's Factual category.
