= Toy Soldiers (2010 film) =

- Directed by: John Walsh
- Narrated by: Gareth Gates
- Country of origin: United Kingdom
- Original language: English

Production
- Executive producer: Roger James
- Producer: John Walsh
- Running time: 28 minutes
- Production company: Walsh Bros Ltd.

Original release
- Release: December 6, 2010

Toy Soldiers is a British documentary for BBC by John Walsh. of Walsh Bros Ltd. For the first time on television children reveal what life is like when a parent goes off to war and was commissioned as part of the BBC's look at children in conflicts and war zones entitled the Army Zone. "The child's voice has rarely been heard on this subject before. The goal of this film is not just to give a voice to this story but to challenge perceptions of children whose parents go to war."

The film looks at how they try to maintain normality as their lives are interrupted by a conflict that they might not understand, taking place in a country they may never have heard of. For some a return is around the corner, for others a loss will affect the rest of their lives. It is narrated by Gareth Gates. The documentary uses animations, the children's own artwork, and interviews. The film was praised by Dr Geraldine Walford for challenging perceptions around the topic of childhood grief: "good to see this sensitive and crucially important topic being opened up for people to learn from." Walsh discusses it on the BBC Radio 4 Today Programme.

== Festival nominations ==
Monte Carlo Festival of Television nominated, 2012. Entered for Prix Jeunesse International Munich, 7-11 non-fiction category.

== Reception ==
In the Church of England Newspaper on 12 February 2012 they remarked that "In Toy Soldiers has featured some of the 175,000 children whose parents work in the armed forces, including Aiden who father died while trying to safely dispose of a bomb … this series is not to be missed."
