= Alpi the Soul Sender =

Japanese manga series by Rona

- First tankōbon volume cover

送魂の少女と葬礼の旅 (Sōkon no Shōjo to Sōrei no Tabi)
- Genre: Coming of age; Fantasy; Supernatural
- Manga
- Written by: Rona
- Published by: Tokuma Shoten; Coamix
- English publisher: NA: Titan Comics
- Imprint: Zenon Comics
- Magazine: Web Comic Zenyon
- Original run: June 24, 2018 – March 25, 2022
- Volumes: 7
- icon

Alpi the Soul Sender (送魂の少女と葬礼の旅, Sōkon no Shōjo to Sōrei no Tabi) is a Japanese manga series written and illustrated by Rona. It was serialized on Coamix's Web Comic Zenyon manga website from June 2018 to March 2022.

== Plot ==
Long ago, the gods planted sacred seeds called "Spirits" in the land, and humans were forever thankful for the blessings these Spirits brought. Yet, even the Spirits are not immune to the passage of time. When their lives end, their bodies are consumed by darkness, spreading decay around them. Only the "Soul Senders" have the power to guide these cursed spirits to their final rest. This is the story of Alpi, a young Soul Sender, who, despite enduring immense sorrow and suffering, uses her blade to carry out this solemn duty.

== Publication ==
Written and illustrated by Rona, Alpi the Soul Sender was serialized on Coamix's Web Comic Zenyon manga website from June 24, 2018, to March 25, 2022. Its chapters were collected into seven tankōbon volumes released from April 20, 2019, to May 20, 2022. The series is licensed in English by Titan Comics.

No.	Original release date	Original ISBN	North American release date	North American ISBN
1	April 20, 2019	978-4-19-980564-6 (original); 978-4-86720-128-2 (reprint)	October 10, 2023	978-1-78774-130-0
1. "The Bright Soul Sender"; 2. "The Lake with the Dark Purple Waters"; 3. "The Temple of Purification"; 4. "A Wish for the Fire Moth Part 1"; 5. "A Wish for the Fire Moth Part 2"
2	June 20, 2019	978-4-19-980577-6 (original); 978-4-86720-129-9 (reprint)	February 13, 2024	978-1-78774-131-7
6. "Wandering Whirlwind"; 7. "Tending to the Self"; 8. "Polishing Purification"; 9. "The Fields Where Thunder Howls Part 1"; 10. "The Fields Where Thunder Howls Part 2"
3	January 20, 2020	978-4-19-980612-4 (original); 978-4-86720-130-5 (reprint)	May 7, 2024	978-1-78774-132-4
11. "The Fields Where Thunder Howls Part 3"; 12. "The Gloomy Cave Part 1"; 13. "The Gloomy Cave Part 2"; 14. "The Sound of a Torrent"; 15. "The Private Collection"
4	July 20, 2020	978-4-86720-160-2	August 6, 2024	978-1-78774-133-1
16. "The Conspiracy Unfolds"; 17. "The Concealed Library"; 18. "A Ruined Passion"; 19. "A Detailed Account of the Occurrence"; 20. "The Cemetery of Staves"; 20.5. "The Sign of the Giant"
5	January 20, 2021	978-4-86720-197-8	November 19, 2024	978-1-78774-134-8
21. "Experts Mobilized"; 22. "The Scene of the Disaster"; 23. "The Corpse and the Secret"; 24. "Silent Sabotage"; 25. "Evil's Attack"
6	July 19, 2021	978-4-86720-249-4	March 4, 2025	978-1-78774-135-5
26. "The Intense End"; 27. "The Veil of Sin"; 28. "The Original Connection"; 29. "A Fateful Encounter"; 30. "The Mountain Peak and an Ambitious Undertaking"; 30.5. "A Rousing Ringleader"
7	May 20, 2022	978-4-86720-310-1	July 15, 2025	978-1-78774-136-2
31. "A Leader's Atonement"; 32. "The Course of the Disaster"; 33. "A Suspicious Encroachment"; 34. "Father on the Opposite Shore"; 35. "The Sender of Souls"

== Reception ==
Rebecca Silverman from Anime News Network mentioned that Alpi the Soul Sender was marketed as a series for magical girl fans, though she felt it focuses more on Alpi's role as a Soul Sender than on magical transformations. She compared the series to gentle journey manga, such as Somali and the Forest Spirit, noting its strong world-building and Alpi's struggle with a curse that requires painful purification. While the story begins lightheartedly, Silverman observed that it grows darker as Alpi confronts deeper questions about her purpose and allegiances. Despite a slow start, she suggested that the series showed potential, with stronger themes and character development in later chapters, and praises the detailed art, recommending it as worth following.

The series has been recommended by manga creators Kore Yamazaki and Taku Kuwabara.
