= Andrew Sumner =

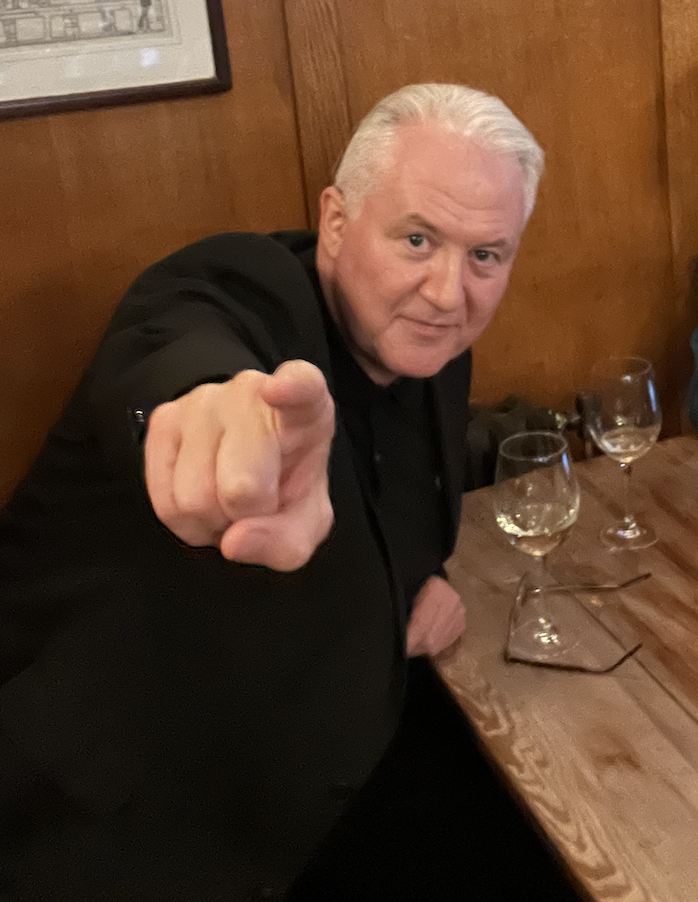

Andrew Sumner is a British journalist, editor, TV presenter and publisher.

== Background & Career ==
Sumner wrote for the comics news magazine Speakeasy in the 1980s. He was a movie journalist for the NME, Vox and Total Film throughout the 1990s and wrote regularly for Uncut. Sumner published various magazines for Emap before joining IPC as publisher of Loaded and Uncut. He launched Uncut DVD and later published Now magazine. Sumner presented The Uncut Film on Turner Classic Movies, a series of contemporary classic movies curated by Uncut that ran on TCM UK at 9pm Wednesdays.

During his time at IPC, Sumner revived Fleetway's classic British comics library, overseeing Dirk Maggs' Adventures of Sexton Blake for BBC Radio 2, co-publishing (with DC Comics) Leah Moore, John Reppion and Shane Oakley's Albion; Dave Gibbons and John Higgins' Thunderbolt Jaxon; and Garth Ennis and Colin Wilson's Battler Britton. He curated Titan Books' reprint archive editions The King of Crooks, The Steel Claw, and Albion Origins.

Sumner left IPC to be Directeur Général of Cahiers du Cinéma (during its transition from Le Monde to Phaidon Press) and is Chief Operating Officer of the international Titan Entertainment Group, overseeing Forbidden Planet Ltd, editing Titan Books' Mike Hammer novels written by Mickey Spillane and Max Allan Collins and hosting their Forbidden Planet TV channel. He also serves as the host of the annual Ealing Film Festival.
