= John Walsh (filmmaker) =

English filmmaker

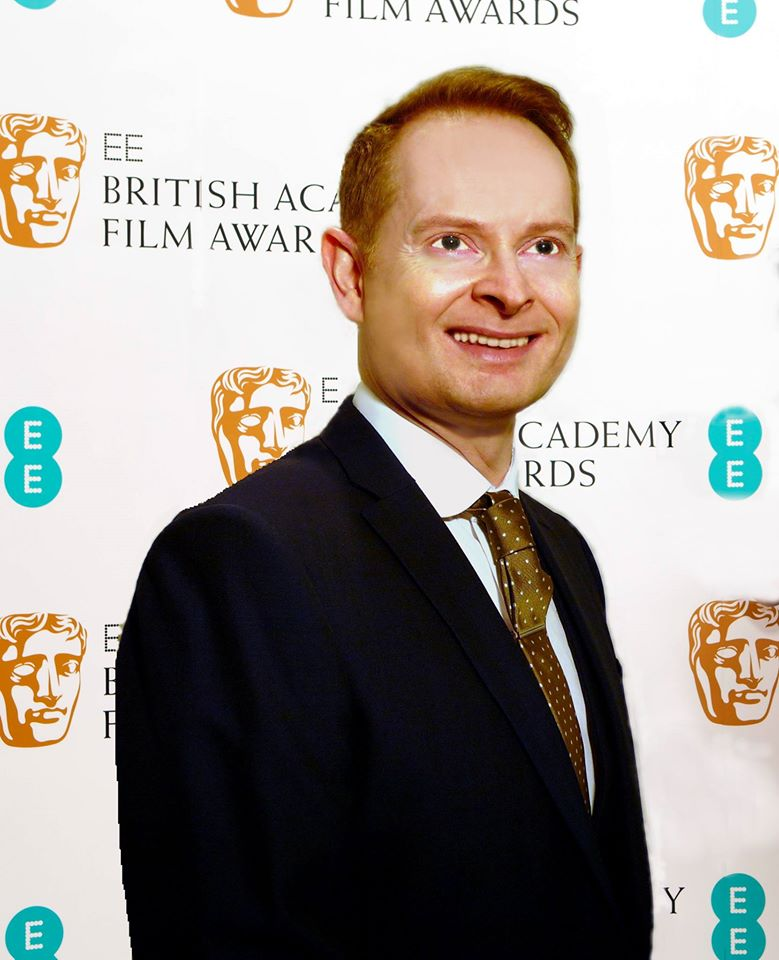
- Walsh at BAFTA Film Awards
- Born: London, England
- Education: London Film School
- Occupations: Film director Screenwriter; Film producer
- Notable work: Monarch; ToryBoy The Movie; Headhunting The Homeless
- Website: www.walshbros.co.uk

John Walsh is an English filmmaker and author. He is the founder of the film company Walsh Bros. Ltd. Two of his children’s documentaries received BAFTA nominations. Since 2019, he has written a series of “making of” coffee table books for Titan Publishing Group. Walsh is a Trustee of the Ray and Diana Harryhausen Foundation.

== Early life and education ==
A filmmaker from a young age, Walsh had his first super-8 camera by the age of ten. At the age of 18 he was the youngest student accepted to the London Film School (LFS) in 1989. He made a film there on stop-motion animation filmmaker Ray Harryhausen. Walsh graduated from the LFS in 1990 or 1991, according to its blog.

== Film ==
Walsh founded Walsh Bros Ltd. in 1992. It was ranked 70 in the Televisual Magazine's list of the top 100 independent film companies in the UK in 2012.

In 2010, Walsh stood as a parliamentary candidate in the 2010 General Election and made the gonzo-style documentary feature film Tory Boy The Movie, which was released in cinemas in 2011 and 2012. The film follows Walsh as he becomes a Conservative candidate after a lifetime of voting Labour motivated by reports that Sir Stuart Bell, the Labour Party's MP in Middlesbrough, was absent so often from the town that he was an unsuitable candidate. The file was nominated for the Grierson Awards for "Best Documentary on a Contemporary Theme".

In 2014, Walsh's remastered version of the film Monarch was released. The original negative for the film had been lost. The film starred late Irish stage and screen actor T. P. McKenna and Jean Marsh. This subsequently led to cinema showing starting at the Tricycle Cinema.

== Television ==
Walsh's three-part Grierson Trust-nominated BBC series Headhunting The Homeless was part of the corporation's 120 most treasured programmes of the first half of 2003, and was included in the corporation's drive to convince its critics that the licence fee should not be abolished. The Guardian described the series as "truly touching" and also chose it as their Pick of the Day.

The BAFTA-nominated and New York Film Festival-winning Channel 4 series Don't Make Me Angry (2003) was about anger management. This ran for two series.

In 2010, Walsh's five part BBC series on childhood homelessness, Sofa Surfers, was nominated for the Social Award at the Rose d'Or Awards.

The BAFTA-nominated 2010 film My Life: Karate Kids tackled issues of bullying among disabled children. It was narrated by David Tennant.

The Monte Carlo Golden Nymph Award nominated BBC film Toy Soldiers, made in 2010 and screened in 2014, presented the point of view of the bereaved children of UK service personnel. Walsh discussed this on the BBC Radio 4 Today Programme. According to the blog of the private medical service Dr Mortons, the film was mentioned positively by retired psychiatrist Geraldine Walford, who said it had been shown in schools across the country. It was also entered for the Foundation Prix Jeunesse in 2012.

Walsh worked with charity boss Eva Hamilton on her venture Key4Life and made a five-minute publicity film for them in December 2013 about their work with former young offenders.

== Ray & Diana Harryhausen Foundation ==
Walsh has been a Trustee of the Ray & Diana Harryhausen Foundation since 2014. He first met with Ray Harryhausen in the late 1980s as a film student of the London Film School and in 1990 wrote and directed a 15-minute documentary entitled Ray Harryhausen: Movement Into Life, narrated by Tom Baker.

Walsh helped the Foundation film and record commentary tracks in Ray Harryhausen’s London home commencing 17 May 2012. Since that date recordings were made about Clash of The Titans, Mysterious Island, The 3 Worlds of Gulliver, First Men in the Moon with Randy Cook, The Valley of Gwangi with his daughter Vanessa Harryhausen, One Million Years B.C. with Martine Beswick, The Golden Voyage of Sinbad with fellow Trustee Caroline Munro, Mighty Joe Young with film director John Landis and Sinbad and the Eye of the Tiger with SFX artist Colin Arthur. These were released as podcasts.

At San Diego Comic-Con in 2021, the Foundation announced the new Ray Harryhausen Awards, devised by Walsh. Walsh then received one of these awards in 2022.

== Writing and journalism ==
In additional to his film and TV screenplays, Walsh has written on film history, politics and religion in The Daily Telegraph, The Independent, The Catholic Herald and Conservative Home. He contributed to the Titan Books title, Ray Harryhausen Poster Art Book, written by sci-fi journalist and author Richard Holliss.

=== Books ===
Year	Title	ISBN	Publisher	Awards / Nominations*
2026	The Texas Chain Saw Massacre: The Official Story of the Film	9781835413852	Titan Books	
2025	Gladiator II: The Art and Making of the Ridley Scott Film	9781419780165	Abrams Books	
2024	The Third Man: The Official Story of the Film	9781835410011	Titan Books	
2023	The Wicker Man: The Official Story of the Film	9781803365084	Titan Books	Nominee, Rondo Hatton Classic Horror Awards* "Book of the Year"
2023	Conan the Barbarian: The Official Story of the Film	9781803361765	Titan Books	
2022	Dr Who and the Daleks: The Official Story of the Films	9781803360188	Titan Books	Honorable mention, Rondo Hatton Classic Horror Awards* "Book of the Year"
2021	Escape from New York: The Official Story of the Film	9781789095067	Titan Books	Nominee, Rondo Hatton Classic Horror Awards* "Book of the Year"
2020	Flash Gordon: The Official Story of the Film	9781789095067	Titan Books	Honorable mention, Rondo Hatton Classic Horror Awards* "Book of the Year"
2019	Harryhausen: The Lost Movies	9781789091106	Titan Books	Runner-up, Rondo Hatton Classic Horror Awards* "Book of the Year"

== Filmography and awards ==
Year	Title	Role	Film / television	Award / nomination*
2021	Escape From New York: The Official Story of the Film	Producer, director, writer	Documentary Series	
2020	Flash Gordon: The Official Story of the Film	Producer, director, writer	Documentary Series	
2019	Harryhausen: The Lost Movies	Producer, director, writer	Documentary Series	
2016–2018	The Ray Harryhausen Podcast	Originator, co-host	Radio series	Honorable mention, Rondo Hatton Classic Horror Awards* "Best Multi-Media"
2016	Jupiter Pluvius at the Tate	Producer, director, writer	Documentary	
2015	ToryBoy The Movie (re-release)	Producer, director, writer	Feature film	
2014	Monarch (re-release)	Producer, director, writer, editor	Feature film	
2014	Monarch Restoring A King	Producer, director, writer, editor	Documentary	
2013	Key 4 Life	Producer, director, writer	15-minute documentary	
2012	Blinding	Producer, director, writer	BBC documentary	
2012	ToryBoy The Aftermath	Producer, director, writer	Documentary	
2011	ToryBoy The Movie	Producer, director, writer	Feature film	Shortlisted, Grierson Awards Best Documentary on a Contemporary Theme
2010	Toy Soldiers	Producer, director, writer	BBC documentary	Nominated, Monte-Carlo Television Festival Entered, Prix Jeunesse Munich*
2009	The Prime Minister's Global Fellowship	Producer, director, writer	Documentary for the British Council	
2009	My Life: Karate Kids	Producer, director, writer	BBC documentary	Nominated, Children's factual, BAFTA
2008	Sofa Surfers	Producer, director, writer	BBC documentary	Nominated, Rose d'Or Social Award
2007	Don't Make Me Angry – Series 2	Producer, director, writer	Channel 4 documentary	Bronze World Medal, New York Television Festival Best Young Adult Special Documentary Series
2006	Don't Make Me Angry – Series 1	Producer, director, writer	Channel 4 documentary	Nominated, Children's learning: secondary, BAFTA
2003	Headhunting The Homeless	Producer, director, writer	BBC documentary	Grierson Awards Best Documentary Series
2001	Nu Model Armi	Producer, director, writer	Channel 4 documentary	
2001	TREX2	Producer, director, writer	Channel 5 documentary	
2000	TREX	Producer, director, writer	Channel 5 documentary	
2000	Monarch	Producer, director, writer, editor	Feature film	
1999	Cowboyz & Cowgirlz	Producer, director, writer	Channel 5 documentary	
1998	Boyz & Girlz : Greece	Producer, director, writer	Channel 5 documentary	
1998	Boyz & Girlz	Producer, director, writer	Channel 5 documentary	
1991	Masque of Draperie	Producer, director, writer, editor	Documentary	
1990	The Comedy Store	Producer, director, writer, editor	Documentary	
1990	The Sceptic and the Psychic	Producer, writer	Drama	
1989	Ray Harryhausen: Movement Into Life	Producer, director, writer	15-minute documentary	
1989	The Sleeper	Producer, director, writer, editor	Drama	
1985	A State of Mind	Producer, director, Writer, editor	Drama	Screen Test BBC Young Film Maker of the Year 1985*
