= Headhunting The Homeless =

- Television poster
- Directed by: John Walsh
- Narrated by: Ray Burdis
- Country of origin: United Kingdom
- Original language: English

Production
- Producer: John Walsh
- Running time: 3 x 60 min.
- Production company: Walsh Bros Ltd.

Original release
- Network: BBC Two
- Release: 9 May 2003

Headhunting The Homeless is a British documentary series for the BBC by John Walsh of Walsh Bros Ltd. This three part series followed five homeless people for over a year as they looked for employment on a new scheme involving two hundred companies, including Marks & Spencer, Pret a Manger and Wates Construction, following the work of Eva Hamilton MBE’s Business Action on Homelessness project as part of Business in the Community. The goal of this project was to try and break the cycle of homelessness for good, to challenge perceptions of homelessness, and to change the attitudes that business people have and in the process observe the demanding transition into the working world for homeless people. The series followed The Prince of Wales’ Seeing is Believing Programme and then pioneering a new multimillion pound Corporate Social Responsibility project, addressing attempting a new approach on CSR in relation to homelessness.

For Carol Thatcher it’s her first job in 20 years: “I proved to myself that I can do it…I had tears of joy running down my face.” Carol hopes that this new start will help her to reconnect with her children who were taken into care 12 years ago. Accountant David Haighbrown doesn’t fit the stereotype; he’s well-spoken, college educated and motivated. Yet he found himself living rough, forced to rummage through dustbins for food and sleep in shop doorways. “I remember thinking, ‘What have I done to deserve this?’ I’ve never abused drugs or alcohol nor have any criminal record, yet here I am.”

Describing his own film, Walsh has said: "These moving stories of human frailty and redemption, gave for the first time, a dignified voice to people who are not often heard and seldom depicted as real human beings."

== Episodes ==
No.	Title	Original release date
1	"Down... But Not Out"	7 May 2003
A three-part documentary following five homeless people in their efforts to secure long-term employment. In this first programme Carol Thatcher, whose poor mental health has been a hindrance for nearly 20 years, starts work at Sainsbury's. Meanwhile 19-year-old Jide Sosimi hopes that a placement at a top London advertising agency will help him to fulfil his dream of becoming a shoe designer providing that he manages to keep his place at a hostel.
2	"From Malaysia to Britain"	14 May 2003
In the second of a three-part documentary following five homeless people in their efforts to secure long-term employment, Carol Thatcher finds out whether she's landed the job at Sainsbury's and Jide Sosimi reaches a crossroads regarding his future. Meanwhile David Haighbrown, an accountant by trade who is living in a homeless hostel, hopes to find work so that he can bring his family over from Malaysia to Britain.
3	"First Job Last Chance"	23 May 2003
Concluding a three-part documentary following five homeless people in their efforts to secure long-term employment. David Haighbrown finds every cloud has a silver lining after things go wrong for him at his placement. Teenager Sam Ogunde is preparing to go on a course which he hopes will get him a job and a stable home, but his confidence levels are very low. Meanwhile, Michael Brown lives in a hostel in central London. His work placement is a big step. It's the first time he has worked in more than five years and it could be his last chance.

== Awards ==
Grierson Awards nominated for Best Documentary Series or Strand.
