= 3DD Productions =

British television production company

3DD Productions is a UK-based television production company with its own international licensing company. 3DD Entertainment together forming the 3DD Group. Beginning life as a sales company, it now produces all its own programmes now reaching 1,000. The company's owners and team focus on history, music, culture, cinema, music, War and hosted series.

== Current Series and specials ==
- Classic Movies - The story of:, with Ian Nathan including The Third Man, Brighton Rock, The Graduate Season 1 (6x60) For Sky Arts 2023
- Classic Movies - The story of, with Ian Nathan Season 1 (6x60) For Sky Arts 2024
- Art of Film S1 - Magic of Ealing 6x60 Sky Arts
  - Art of Film S2 6x60 2024 Sky Arts
- The Soviet Union 100th Anniversary
- Discovering John Mills
- D-Day The Soldiers Story with Giles Milton 80th Anniversary
- Princess Diana A Tale of Her Spencer Ancestors

== Notable series include ==
- A Tale of Two Sisters 8x60 with Emmeline Pankhurst, Elizabeth II & Princess Margaret, Jacqueline Kennedy Onassis, Anne Frank & Eva Schloss, Amelia Earhart, Anne Boleyn, Queen Mary, The Mitford family
- Classic Literature & Cinema 6x60
- The Stuarts, A Bloody Reign 4x60 with James I, James II, Charles I, Charles II,
- Raiders of the Lost Art 6x60 & 12x30
- Myths & Monsters 6x60
- Shakespeare-The Legacy with John Nettles
- MLK A Marked Man
- Comedy Legends with Barry Cryer
- RFK-America's Lost President
- Hitler Germanys' Fatal Attraction 3x60
- Anne Frank A Tale of Two Sisters Eva Schloss
- Murder Maps 5 seasons with Nicholas Day
- The Vietnam War with Bob Simon & Michael Nicholson
- Rock Legends 12 Seasons David Bowie, Elton John, Eric Clapton, Green Day, Johnny Cash, Neil Diamond, Paul Simon, Pink Floyd, Rod Stewart, Tom Petty, Queen, Amy Winehouse
- Pop Profiles 5 seasons
- Video Killed the Radio Star Episodes The Artists View 24 part series featuring AC/DC, Duran Duran, Spandau Ballet, Sting, U2, Fleetwood Mac, Metallica, Queen, and more
