= Titan Publishing Group =

British publishing company

- Parent company: Titan Entertainment
- Founded: 1981; 45 years ago
- Founder: Nick Landau; Vivian Cheung
- Country of origin: United Kingdom
- Headquarters location: Bankside, London
- Distribution: Littlehampton Book Services (UK); Penguin Random House Publisher Services (US)
- Publication types: Books, graphic novels, magazines, manga
- Fiction genres: Reference books, tie-in media
- Imprints: Titan Books; Titan Magazines; Titan Comics; Titan Manga
- Official website: titanbooks.com

Titan Publishing Group is the publishing division of the British entertainment company Titan Entertainment, which was established as Titan Books in 1981. The books division has two main areas of publishing: film and television tie-ins and cinema reference books; and graphic novels and comics references and art titles. Its imprints are Titan Books, Titan Comics, Titan Magazines and Titan Manga.

== Titan Books ==
Titan Books is a publisher of film, video game and TV tie-in books. As of 2011, the company publishes on average 30 to 40 such titles per year, across a range of formats from "making of" books to screenplays to TV companions and novels, and has a backlist reprint program.

Titan Books' first title was a trade paperback collection of Brian Bolland's Judge Dredd stories from 2000 AD. Titan Books followed the first title with numerous other 2000 AD reprints. Subsequently, the publishing company expanded operations, putting out its first original title in 1987 (Pat Mills and Hunt Emerson's You Are Maggie Thatcher). Around this time, Titan also began publishing Escape magazine (although the title was canceled in 1989). Titan Books continues to publish both new and licensed graphic novels, as well as film and television tie-ins.

Titan Books’ range of fiction includes limited comic books tie-ins and novelizations for such films as Alien, Predator and Alien vs. Predator, Terminator Salvation, Iron Man, The X-Files: I Want to Believe, Transformers, The Dark Knight Rises and Firefly.

Titan also publishes coffee table books on animation, popular culture, collectibles and comic and fantasy art including Harryhausen: The Lost Movies published in 2019, Flash Gordon: The Official Story of the Film published in 2020 and Escape from New York: The Official Story of the Film published in 2021, all written by John Walsh. As of 2016, Titan Books' editorial director is Laura Price.

In 2022, Titan Books began publishing new Conan titles under license from Heroic Signatures, including full-length novels and the Heroic Legends Series of short standalone stories.

=== Reprint comic collections ===
- Beetle Bailey: Daily & Sunday Strips
- The Complete Flash Gordon Library
- Hägar the Horrible: The Epic Chronicles: The Dailies
- Mandrake the Magician
- The Simon & Kirby Library
- Tarzan - The Complete Burne Hogarth Sundays and Dailies Library

== Titan Comics ==
Titan Books also publishes trade paperbacks and graphic novels in the UK and United States under the imprint Titan Comics. The company has a backlist of over 1,000 graphic novels. Its titles include such licensed characters and properties as Batman, Doctor Who, Family Guy, Heroes, Nemi, Superman, Judge Dredd and other 2000 AD characters, the Vertigo comic-book title Sandman, The Simpsons, Star Wars, Tank Girl, The Real Ghostbusters, Teenage Mutant Ninja Turtles, Transformers, The Walking Dead, Life Is Strange, Roy of the Rovers, Dan Dare, WWE Heroes, World of Warcraft and Bloodborne. In addition to licensed titles, Titan Comics also publishes creator-owned series, such as Bloodthirsty: One Nation Under Water (2015–2016) and Man Plus (2015–2016).

In 2010, Titan acquired the American hardboiled fiction imprint Hard Case Crime, and since that time has released a number of comics and graphic novels under the Hard Case Crime brand. Heroic Signatures gave Titan the license to publish new titles featuring Conan the Barbarian in 2022. Titan Comics was among the publisher Diamond Comic Distributors signed to its new exclusive distribution tier in August 2022. In 2025, Titan asked the court in the Diamond case for clarity regarding the distribution agreement. As of 2021, Titan Comics' publishing directors are Ricky Claydon and John Dziewiatkowski.

== Titan Magazines ==
Titan Magazines is the magazine-publishing division of Titan Publishing Group. Launched in 1995 with Star Trek Magazine, Titan had previously published several one shot film tie-in titles. Since then it has published many film, TV and comics titles, including poster magazines for Tim Burton's Batman.

Some of Titan's magazines are published in the US, although not all, some with an entirely separate magazine.

In April 2016, Bleeding Cool published a blog/vlog entry pertaining to concerns over Titan's UK reprints of DC titles, specifically cancellations and a lack of updates and communication with readers, as well as addressing the frequent inconsistencies regarding the publication dates of future issues.

Titan ceased publication of all DC Comics titles in December 2018, most notably ending a fifteen-year run for 'Batman Legends'.

Titan Magazines currently publishes the following comics and magazines:

Comics

- Adventure Time
- Blade Runner
- Conan the Barbarian
- Doctor Who Comic
- Doctor Who: Tales from the TARDIS
- Rick and Morty
- Simpsons Comics
- Man: Plus
- Minions Comic
- Tank Girl (digital only)
- Black Star

Magazines

- Star Trek Explorer (Nov 2021–)(relaunch of Star Trek Magazine)
- Star Wars Insider
- Souvenir One Shots (different theme each issue, usually TV show tie-ins)

== Titan Manga ==
In 2022, the Titan Publishing Group launched Titan Manga, an imprint focused solely on manga series, with their first release being a "director's cut" of Takashi Okazaki's Afro Samurai.

- 3 Minute Bodyguard Yoko-chan
- Afro Samurai
- After School Invaders
- Alpi the Soul Sender
- Aoashi
- The Assassin Laughs at Twilight
- Assassin's Creed IV: Black Flag - Awakening
- Atom: The Beginning
- Baby
- Black Witch Mirror
- Break Blade
- Burst Angel
- Colori Colore Creare
- Corpse Blade
- Cosmic Censorship
- Darwin's Game
- Do Women Need Sex Entertainment?
- Dominating at the Academy of Returned Heroes
- Dopeman
- Egnaro the Star-Eating Killer
- Eko Eko Azarak Reborn
- The Elegant Courtly Life of the Tea Witch
- Even After Doronjo-sama Was Reincarnated She Remained a Villainess
- Farewell, My Odin
- Gamera Rebirth Code Thyrsos
- Geniearth
- Ghostly Darkness of Kanata
- Gizmorizer
- Grace Rosa
- Gran Familia
- The Great Yokai War: Guardians
- Grendizer U: The Inception
- Have Fun! It's the End of the World!
- Hen Kai Pan
- High Elf with a Long Life
- Huck the Air Pirate and the Princess of Steam
- I.L
- Ifrit of the Sea Sand
- Isekai Metaller
- It's a Little Hard to be a Villainess of an Otome Game in Modern Society
- Kamen Rider Kuuga
- Kuruno Loves the Occult!
- The Legendary Witch Is Reborn as an Oppressed Princess
- The Limits of High-Spec Marriages
- Mountain God's Personal Manga Artist
- My Name Is Zero
- Nova, Little Girl in the Monster Forest
- The Obsession of Red Riding Hood
- The One. Later On...
- Outsiders
- The Poetry of Ran
- The Raven Dark Hero
- Record Journey
- The Regalia of the Underdog
- Resident Evil: Death Island
- Revenge of the Rock ‘n’ Roll Sisters
- Ryuko
- Saint Seiya: Dark Wing
- Sanda
- Scavengers Another Sky
- School for Wizards Old Enough to Learn Magic
- Shadows of Kyoto
- Somali and the Forest Spirit
- Speed Grapher
- Strange Pictures
- Stray
- Sword of the Titans
- Tengen Hero Wars
- Three Exorcism Siblings
- Tojima Wants to Be a Kamen Rider
- Toxic Super Beasts
- Villain Actor
- Welcome to Ghost Mansion
- When I Was Reincarnated in Another World, I Was a Heroine and He Was a Hero
- Witch of Thistle Castle
- Working for God in a Godless World
  - The Godless World of Onee-Chan
- Yan
