= Conquest Pictures =

American film production unit

Conquest Pictures was a film production unit launched in 1917 as part of Thomas A. Edison, Inc. It produced films for young people and families including subjects from popular children's authors such as Robert Louis Stevenson, Richard Harding Davis, Ralph Henry Barbour, and Mary Shipman Andrews. Anna M. Callan was in charge of the division. Its films were distributed through the George Kleine System. It closed in 1918 and its films were sold off as Edison exited the film production business.

== Background ==
Conquest's first release was July 14, 1917.

The Conquest Pictures plan included weekly releases of 7 reels of film including varying content such as a main 4-reel film, a 1-reel comedy, a 1-reel travel feature, and magazine style news reel. The films could also be ordered individually. The programs were intended to be promoted by involvement from women's clubs who advocated for wholesome fare and marketed to educators and families.

In February 1918, an advertisement touting Conquest Pictures programs ran in the Boy Scouts of America publication Boys Life. The ad compared the film programs to the Every Boy's Library calling them the "Every Boy's Library of the Motion Picture World".

Edison's movie division faced stiff competition and difficult times in the World War I era. In 1918 the Lincoln and Parker Film Company of Worcester, Massachusetts acquired Edison film company assets and equipment as well as some of its film footage including Conquest's programs.

== Filmography ==
=== Conquest Program #2 ===
- Knights of the Square Table, a film adaptation from James A. Wilder's story
- Farmer Al Falfa & His Wayward Pup, an animated cartoon about a puppy, a pipe smoking farmer, and their misadventures with birds in a farm
- Your Flag and My Flag, a short film illustrating the poem "Your Flag and My Flag"
- What Form Means to an Athlete, feature about muscles and fitness
- The Story of the Willow Plate, about an ancient Chinese legend

=== Conquest Program #4 ===
- The Half back, a film adaptation of the story by Ralph Henry Barbour
- The Boy Who Cried Wolf, about a boy on the lookout for spies who turns up false leads until uncovering a German spy
- Playing in Florida, a feature about wealthy travelers who migrate to Florida
- Crystals in Formation, a film about crystals and their growth
- Joy Riders of the Ocean, a documentary film about remoras that attach onto sharks and how inhabitants of the West Indies use them to catch turtles
- In Love's Laboratory, story about a character inventing the safety match and achieving a relationship match

=== Conquest Program #7 ===
- T. Haviland Hicks, Freshman, about the misadventures and attempted hazing of a freshman student
- Gallegher, a film adaptation of ..... story from Gallegher, and other stories and its newspaper copy boy and boy investigator character, a disciple of Sherlock Holmes
- Turning Out Silver Bullets, a short documentary about the minting of coins
- Young Salts, a feature on activity at the Culver Military Academy
- The Holy Land, travelogue about scenery and traditions in The Holy Land

=== Conquest Program #9 ===
- Kidnapped, a film adaptation of Robert Louis Stevenson's tale Kidnapped
- Friends, Romans and Leo, a comedy set in the lion pits of ancient Rome
- Quaint Provincetown on Cape Cod, a feature on the historic village of Provincetown, Massachusetts on Cape Cod including its monuments and pilgrim history
- Microscopic Pond Life, a short documentary on cellular organisms living ponds
- Little Red Riding Hood, a film in silhouette depictingnthe classic children's tale Little Red Riding Hood

=== Stop motion shorts ===
The Dinosaur and the Missing Link (1915)

R.F.D. 10,000 B.C. (1916)

Willis O'Brien created at least 3 stop motion shorts that were released as part of Conquest Pictures film packages:

- The Dinosaur and the Missing Link: A Prehistoric Tragedy, a 3-minute and 20 second stop motion animated comedy short about cavemen suitors of a cavewoman, a dinosaur, and an apelike creature
- Prehistoric Poultry: The Dinornis or Great Roaring Whiffenproof, a 2-minute and 20 second stop motion short about cavemen, a dinosaur, and a cavewoman
- R.F.D. 10,000 B.C., a 4-minute 23 second stop motion about daily caveman life

=== Other ===
- Gold and Diamond mines of South Africa, a film in the Library of Congress' Edison films collection

An advertisement seeking stories that were wholesome and not wishy washy described the type Conquest was looking for and gave as examples stories the film company had already used for its adaptations:

- Jack Ballister's Fortune by Howard Pyle
- A film adaptation of Mary Shipman Andrews' story The Star Spangled Banner from her book Old Glory
- Stories by Kirk Munroe adapted to film

An advertisement for libraries with film equipment or that can show films through partnerships with cinemas notes other Conquest films as:

- A Vanishing Race, shot on the Blackfoot Indian Reservation

(1917)
