= James Wilder =

James Wilder may refer to:

- James A. Wilder (1868–1934), Hawaiian artist and scout
- James Wilder Sr. (born 1958), American former football running back in the NFL
- James Wilder Jr. (born 1992), American football running back in the CFL and NFL
- James Wilder (actor) (born 1968), American actor
