= The Black Scorpion (film) =

1957 film

- Theatrical release poster
- Directed by: Edward Ludwig
- Written by: Robert Blees; David Duncan
- Produced by: Jack Dietz; Frank Melford
- Starring: Richard Denning; Mara Corday; Carlos Rivas; Mario Navarro
- Cinematography: Lionel Lindon
- Edited by: Richard L. Van Enger
- Music by: Paul Sawtell
- Distributed by: Warner Bros. Pictures
- Release date: October 11, 1957 (U. S.)
- Running time: 88 minutes
- Countries: United States; Mexico
- Language: English

The Black Scorpion is a 1957 black-and-white giant arachnid horror film from Warner Bros. Pictures, produced by Jack Dietz and Frank Melford, directed by Edward Ludwig, and starring Richard Denning, Mara Corday, Carlos Rivas, and Mario Navarro. The film's stop-motion animation special effects were created by Willis O'Brien. In the film, volcanic activity releases giant prehistoric scorpions from the earth. They wreak havoc in the rural countryside and eventually threaten Mexico City. The film was released on October 11, 1957, and was later shown on a double bill in 1958 with the William Castle film Macabre (1958).

== Plot ==
An earthquake strikes Mexico, resulting in the overnight birth of a new volcano. Geologists Dr. Hank Scott and Dr. Arturo Ramos are dispatched to study this crisis at the village of San Lorenzo, the two men finding a destroyed house and a totaled police car en route. They find a dead policeman nearby, and an abandoned and seemingly orphaned infant. They take the infant to San Lorenzo and give it to friends of the child's missing parents, while being welcomed by the village's priest, Father Delgado. Delgado reveals that the property damage is caused by something that is slaughtering the livestock, the villagers believing the culprit to be a demon bull and have been pestering Delgado for divine assistance.

Undaunted, Hank and Arturo begin their geological survey as members of the Mexican army under Major Cosio arrive in San Lorenzo to begin disaster-relief efforts. Hank meets and falls in love with local rancher Teresa Alvarez, and makes friends with a young boy named Juanito. When the volcano erupts again, the culprits behind the disappearances and deaths are revealed as giant prehistoric scorpions. After killing a crew of telephone repairmen, the scorpions attack San Lorenzo with the Mexican military unable to harm them. The next morning, the scorpions have returned to their underground lair, leaving the authorities to seek the help of renowned entomologist Dr. Velasco. Velasco sends Hank and Arturo to scout the cavern to determine whether poison gas would be an effective means of extermination. While also fending off giant worms and spiders, Hank and Arturo observe that the scorpions kill each other by striking a small white spot on their throats. Returning to the surface, they report that the cavern is too vast for poison gas to fill it at sufficient density, so Velasco says their only choice is to seal the entrance with dynamite. Hank objects that there may be other entrances, but Velasco points out that all the sightings of giant scorpions have been traced to this source.

The giant scorpions resurface days later to attack a train. Some of the passengers are killed. In-fighting among the scorpions resolves with the largest of them killing the others before heading for Mexico City. Hank and Arturo come up with a plan to lure it to a stadium with a truckload of meat, with the military distracting it long enough to kill it by shooting an electric cable attached to a spear into the white spot on its throat. However, the spear misses. The soldiers neglect to shut off the power after the miss, so the gunman is fatally electrocuted when he attempts to reload the spear. Hank re-fires the spear himself, finally slaying the last scorpion.

== Cast ==
- Richard Denning as Dr. Hank Scott
- Mara Corday as Teresa Alvarez
- Carlos Rivas as Dr. Arturo Ramos
- Mario Navarro as Juanito
- Carlos Múzquiz as Dr. Velasco
- Pascual García Peña as Dr. Delacruz
- Pedro Galván as Father Delgado
- Arturo Martínez as Major Cosio
- Fanny Schiller as Florentina

== Production ==
Willis O'Brien, creator of the stop-motion animation effects for the original King Kong, was the special-effects supervisor, albeit on a smaller budget. Pete Peterson, who worked with O'Brien on Mighty Joe Young and would again on The Giant Behemoth, did most of the actual hands-on animation. O'Brien borrowed heavily from his previous films for the stop-motion special effects. The miniatures used for the trapdoor spider and the giant tentacled worm have been reported to be the same ones that were used in the "Lost Spider Pit Sequence" from the original King Kong (1933). The trapdoor spider model matches precisely the smaller spider model seen in behind-the-scenes stills from King Kong. Biographers, however, dispute whether O'Brien saved his models, and Ray Harryhausen's An Animated Life noted that many models used in King Kong were still in storage at RKO in the 1950s, by which time many were decayed. The sounds made by the giant scorpions were reminiscent of the giant ant sound effects used in Them! A large-scale scorpion "head" was used for close-up reaction shots. The opening sequence uses footage from the eruption of Parícutin, a volcano active in Mexico in 1943 to 1952. Models provided by Lionel were used for the train.

== Reception ==
Harrison's Reports gave The Black Scorpion a mixed review, with praise for its special effects but reservations about its unexceptional storytelling, long running time, and mediocre photography with revolting closeups. The New York Times liked the Mexican locations and some of the "technical fakery" but considered the film "strictly standard" with forgettable human plot elements.

=== Mystery Science Theater 3000 ===
The Black Scorpion was featured in episode number 113 of Mystery Science Theater 3000. The episode debuted February 3, 1990, on the Comedy Channel. In show continuity, this was the last episode for Josh Weinstein, who voiced robot Tom Servo and portrayed Dr. Clayton Forrester's assistant, Dr. Laurence "Larry" Erhardt. Dr. Erhardt was proclaimed missing and replaced by Frank Conniff's TV's Frank in season two, while Kevin Murphy began voicing Tom Servo. However, although the episode number suggests this was the last episode of MST3K's first season, Women of the Prehistoric Planet (episode 104) was produced and aired after The Black Scorpion, so that movie was actually the last in which Weinstein participated.

Paste writer Jim Vorel did not rate the episode highly. "It's a little tedious, sure, but the film actually sports some pretty damn cool-looking stop-motion animation special effects," Vorel wrote, but "the story ... is instantly forgettable."

The MST3K version of The Black Scorpion was included as part of the Mystery Science Theater 3000, Volume XXX DVD collection, released by Shout! Factory on July 29, 2014. The other episodes in the four-disc set include Outlaw, The Projected Man, and It Lives by Night. The Black Scorpion disc included the featurette Stinger of Death: Making the Black Scorpion.

== Home media ==
The film was released on region 1 DVD with a cardboard snapper case in an open matte 4:3 ratio. This version was replaced by a 1.78:1 widescreen print, both on region 1 DVD and a region free Blu-ray, released by Warner Bros. Archive Collection.

The extras on all releases include stop-motion test footage by Pete Peterson for unrealized projects, animated around the late 1950s, known as “Las Vegas Monster” and “Beetlemen”, and the sequence that Harryhausen and O’Brien animated for the 1956 Irwin Allen documentary, The Animal World.
