= Creation (unfinished film) =

Unfinished film

Creation is an unfinished feature film, and a project of stop motion animator Willis O'Brien. It was about modern men encountering dinosaurs and other prehistoric animals on an island. The picture was scrapped by RKO studio head David O. Selznick on the grounds of expense, and Merian C. Cooper, the studio producer who recommended the film's cancellation, considered the storyline to be boring, due to lack of action. The completed footage ran 20 minutes in length, although approximately five minutes (or 500 ft in 35mm) is all that survives today. The surviving footage shows a stop motion dinosaur watching a live action boy hunting a live action animal. Cooper later used some of the miniatures and dinosaur armatures and O'Brien's stop-motion animation techniques for King Kong.

== Plot ==
The friends and family of American tycoon Thorton Armitage are enjoying a luxury cruise about the yacht The Titan. Steve, the personal tutor and mentor of Thorton Armitage's son Billy, teaches Billy about the theory of evolution. Billy's older sister Elaine flirts with Steve, who mistakenly believes that she is in love with him. Ned Hallet, Elaine's fiancée, watches from a distance as the two kiss. When Steve looks to confess his love for Elaine, she explains that the kiss meant nothing. Embarrassed and enraged, Steve threatens to quit the crew.

A tempest forms, threatening to destroy the ship. Luckily, a Chilean submarine surfaces and encourages the crew of the Titan to board. The yacht is destroyed just as the submarine dives. The submarine's crew see strange underwater creatures, then surface on a tropical island. The crew soon discover that dinosaurs exist on the island and promptly escape from a stampede. Later, Steve and the Chilean Navy are attacked by a prehistoric rhinoceros-like mammal known as an Arsinoitherium. The Arsinoitherium gores many of the sailors to death, before knocking the fleeing sailors from a log bridge, with Steve narrowly managing to escape.

The survivors, assuming that they will never see civilization again, build a shelter to live in. After Ned Hallet shoots a Brontosaurus, the sauropod retaliates by destroying the shelter. Ned Hallet leaves the camp in anger after being scolded and takes his frustration out on a baby Triceratops. The mother rushes to the aid of the infant and kills Hallet.

While the camp are exploring ancient ruins, a block gives way, causing Elaine to fall. Elaine is attacked by a Pteranodon which is driven off by Steve. Shortly afterwards, the crew are chased into a temple by an aggressive Stegosaurus. The crew is trapped between the Stegosaurus and a Tyrannosaurus. Rather than kill the crew, the two dinosaurs fight one another. In the end, the Tyrannosaurus kills the Stegosaurus and feeds it to its infant as the crew escapes.

After searching the temple, the crew discover a type of metal needed to get their radio to work. The crew try to send out an S.O.S., but the volcano begins to erupt, causing mass hysteria among the dinosaurs. A Pteranodon destroys the tower used to conduct the signal, leaving the crew stranded to be killed by the volcano. Facing death, Elaine and Steve finally confess their love for one another. As Billy faints from heat exhaustion, a rescue plane arrives and saves the crew from certain doom.

Aboard a rescue ship, Thorton Armitage boasts of his adventures. He is mocked, when suddenly a Pteranodon flies aboard the ship, proving his story to be true. The film ends with Steve and Elaine sharing a laugh as they look forward to their new life together.

== Characters ==
- Steve; Billy Armitage's tutor (who would have been played by Joel McCrea) the story's main protagonist
- Thorton Armitage; an American tycoon
- Elaine Armitage; Thorton Armitage's socialite daughter
- Billy Armitage; Thorton Armitage's youngest child
- Ned Hallet; Elaine's fiancée (played by Ralf Harolde, the only confirmed cast member)
- Louise Armitage; Billy and Elaine's friendly and overweight aunt
- Benny; a Jewish chef
- Chico; Elaine's pet monkey

== Production ==
O'Brien worked alongside Marcel Delgado on the project for almost a year.

== Legacy ==
Despite his dislike for the film's story, the special effects in the completed footage impressed Cooper and inspired him to hire O'Brien to create the effects in Cooper's film King Kong (1933). Some of the dinosaur scenes planned for Creation were even rewritten and inserted into the King Kong script and most of the dinosaur models O'Brien used in Kong had originally been made for Creation. The shipwreck sequence in Kong's companion production, The Most Dangerous Game, was reportedly salvaged from this film.

In the two-disc 2005 DVD release of King Kong, the surviving footage from Creation is shown, as well as a dramatization of how the entire film might have been like if completed, using a combination of the existing footage, along with production sketches, test stills and a voiceover narrator.

In the remaining footage, two infant Triceratops play tug of war with a vine before their mother separates the two. The loser of the conflict wanders off into the jungle where it views a chimpanzee, a jaguar, and eventually an armed sailor identified by the script as Ned Hallet. Hallet stumbles upon the infant Triceratops and shoots it through the eye. The dying infant screams out to its mother who charges to the rescue, chasing Hallet through the jungle. The final scene in which Ned Hallet is gored to death by the vengeful mother is lost. Merian C. Cooper intended to use the footage in King Kong, but felt that it did not fit in with the rest. An altered scene involving three adult Triceratops, two of which are killed by Kong, while the third one shows up at one side of the log bridge over the chasm into which Kong (on the other side) kills some of the men on the bridge by rolling it back and forth, causing them to fall to their deaths below, does appear in the 1932 Kong screenplay and the film's novelization.

Parts of the remaining footage can also be seen in the computer game Dinosaur Museum by Perspective Visuals and the educational video More Dinosaurs.

Some of the other creatures planned for the film were an Agathaumas, a Styracosaurus and an Ankylosaurus, according to concept art.

=== Influence on Kong ===
- The scene in King Kong in which Kong shakes sailors off a log bridge was inspired by the scene in Creation in which the Arsinoitherium knocks sailors from a log.
- Ann Darrow's abduction by the Pteranodon was heavily inspired by a scene in Creation in which a Pteranodon attempted to abduct Elaine, Steve's love interest.
- Kong's battle with the Tyrannosaurus was taken from a scene in Creation where the Tyrannosaurus battles a Stegosaurus in an ancient golden temple.
- The Brontosaurus swamp chase scene was taken from the scene in Creation were Steve and the sailors get chased by a stampede of Brontosaurus.

== See also ==
- List of stop-motion films
