= Pete Peterson (animator) =

- Peterson on the set of Mighty Joe Young.
- Born: Svend Aage Pedersen; September 30, 1903; Denmark
- Died: February 24, 1962 (aged 58); Los Angeles, California, United States
- Occupation: Special effects technician

Pete Peterson (born Svend Aage Pedersen; September 30, 1903 - February 24, 1962) was an American motion picture special effects and stop-motion animation pioneer, best remembered for his work with Willis H. O'Brien on Mighty Joe Young (1949), The Black Scorpion (1957) and The Giant Behemoth (1959).

== Biography ==
Pete Peterson, who changed to this name in 1945, worked as a grip at RKO studios in Hollywood in the 1940s and was assigned to work on Mighty Joe Young (1949) lighting the miniature sets where technical creator Willis H. O'Brien and his first technician Ray Harryhausen were creating the stop-motion animation of the title character. Peterson became fascinated with the process and experimented at home in his spare time by placing tape on people’s arms and legs to gauge movement and filming the results to better understand the process of animation. As the production began to fall behind schedule Peterson volunteered his own services, and as second technician was responsible for several memorable scenes including the nightclub scene where Joe appears on stage for the first time and the escape in the truck. The film won the 1950 Academy Award for Best Visual Effects. It was while working on this film that Peterson met and married his wife, who died three months later.

Willis H. O’Brien later asked Peterson to assist him on the production of the stop motion animation for The Black Scorpion (1957) and Peterson, who had contracted multiple sclerosis and was unable to continue working as a grip, accepted. The two spent a few months on set in Mexico before returning to California to complete such memorable scenes as the descent into the scorpion’s lair, the train wreck and the final conflict in the stadium. Peterson subsequently reused some of the sets and miniatures from this film to create his own test footage including the later-discovered Las Vegas Monster test footage.

Eugene Louriè, the original director of The Black Scorpion who had hired O’Brien for that film, contacted O’Brien and Peterson again regarding the effects work on The Giant Behemoth (1959), but producer David Diamond hired visual effects supervisors Jack Rabin and Irving Block, who subcontracted the stop-motion animation back to O’Brien and Peterson on a meagre portion of the total $20,000 effects budget. O’Brien and Peterson nevertheless came up with innovative solutions to the problems presented by the limited budget and Peterson’s physical deterioration, which required miniature sets be built close to the ground so Peterson could animate whilst seated. After the film Peterson again worked on his own test footage including the colour Beetlemen test footage.

Peterson was diagnosed with kidney cancer and died whilst in surgery in February 1962, and O’Brien died in November of that same year. Some years after the deaths of Peterson and O’Brien, a group of young animators, including Jim Danforth and Dennis Muren, discovered a trunk containing Peterson’s test footage and models, which they used on the production of Flesh Gordon (1974).

== Test films ==
=== Las Vegas Monster test footage ===
Las Vegas Monster is a 1958 American short black-and-white silent animated test film, animated and directed by Pete Peterson, featuring a giant mutated baboon on the rampage. The film was discovered along with the Beetlemen test footage and some of the models used in these and other productions in a trunk recovered from the wife of a former neighbour of Peterson after his death in 1962. One of the young animators who discovered the trunk was Laine Liska who used the armature of the Las Vegas Monster model to create the Great God Porno animated by David W. Allen, Jim Aupperle, and Robert Maine in Flesh Gordon (1974).

=== Beetlemen test footage ===
Beetlemen is a 1960 American short silent animated test film, animated and directed by Pete Peterson, featuring a group of mutated human astronauts, who were trapped in suspended animation in a pressure chamber, marching over a hill. The film was discovered along with the Las Vegas Monster test footage and some of the models used in these and other productions in a trunk recovered from the wife of a former neighbour of Peterson after his death in 1962. One of the young animators who discovered the trunk was Jim Danforth who used one of the Beetlemen models in Flesh Gordon (1974).

== See also ==
- List of American films of 1958
