= The Dinosaur and the Missing Link: A Prehistoric Tragedy =

- The complete film
- Directed by: Willis H. O'Brien
- Produced by: Herman Wobber
- Cinematography: Willis H. O'Brien
- Distributed by: Conquest Pictures
- Release date: 1917
- Running time: 5 minutes
- Country: United States

The Dinosaur and the Missing Link: A Prehistoric Tragedy is a 1917 American comedy silent short film. It was animated with stop motion by Willis H. O'Brien. The film was distributed by Thomas Edison's film company Conquest Pictures in 1917.

The film is also known as The Dinosaur and the Baboon (American reissue title).

== Plot ==
The film starts with a caveman going to give some flowers to a cavegirl. He fails when he hits a tree. However, he keeps going. However, the "Self Appointed Hero" of the story steals the girl's heart. Meanwhile, a gorilla-like ape called "Wild Willie" the Missing Link is watching them. When the Missing Link goes to hunt for snakes at the lake, where the dinosaur is, the dinosaur kills the Missing Link after a fight and goes away. Then the "Hero" finds the Missing Link and takes the credit for killing Wild Willie.

== Reception ==
Smithsonian Magazine called the film "a strange bit of cinema. Cavemen, the ape-like 'missing link' and an ornery sauropod dinosaur act as the players in this early precursor to films like 1981's Caveman. Crude though they were, these stop-motion creatures created by O'Brien would help launch his film career. Better known as the special effects wizard behind The Lost World and King Kong, O'Brien was among the first filmmakers to resurrect dinosaurs on film, leaving an impressive legacy still carried on by special effects experts today."

== See also ==
- List of films featuring dinosaurs

== Bibliography ==
- Berry, Mark F. (2015). The Dinosaur Filmography. McFarland. p. 74. ISBN 978-1-4766-0674-3.
- Neri, Gilberto, Silent Dinosaurs. Prehistoric Creatures in Early Cinema, 2026, pp. 167, ISBN 979-8180737540
