= Marcel Delgado =

Mexican-American sculptor (1901-1976)

Marcel Delgado (January 16, 1901, in Coahuila, Mexico – November 26, 1976, in Los Angeles, California) was a sculptor and model-maker. His technique revolutionized the stop motion film industry. He is best known for his work on the 1933 film King Kong.

Prior to Delgado, stop motion models where typically made from clay, which was difficult to adjust between shots. Delgado built a skeleton for his models. This skeleton was made from Dural and it was then filled in with foam rubber or cotton cloth and covered with latex to serve as skin, giving his models a more natural and realistic look, while simultaneously making it easier to handle them. Sometimes he also incorporated an inflatable bladder that helped him simulate breathing.

== Early life ==
Delgado's family moved to California in 1910, running away from the Mexican Revolution. He first started sculpting at age 6.

As his family was very poor, Delgado worked most of the time, leaving school behind. He did not learn English until he was 17, a fact that more often than not made his getting a job difficult. In 1921 he split his time working in a convenience store and taking art lessons at the Otis Art Institute (now called Otis College of Art and Design), where he also got a part-time job to pay for his lessons.

== Career ==
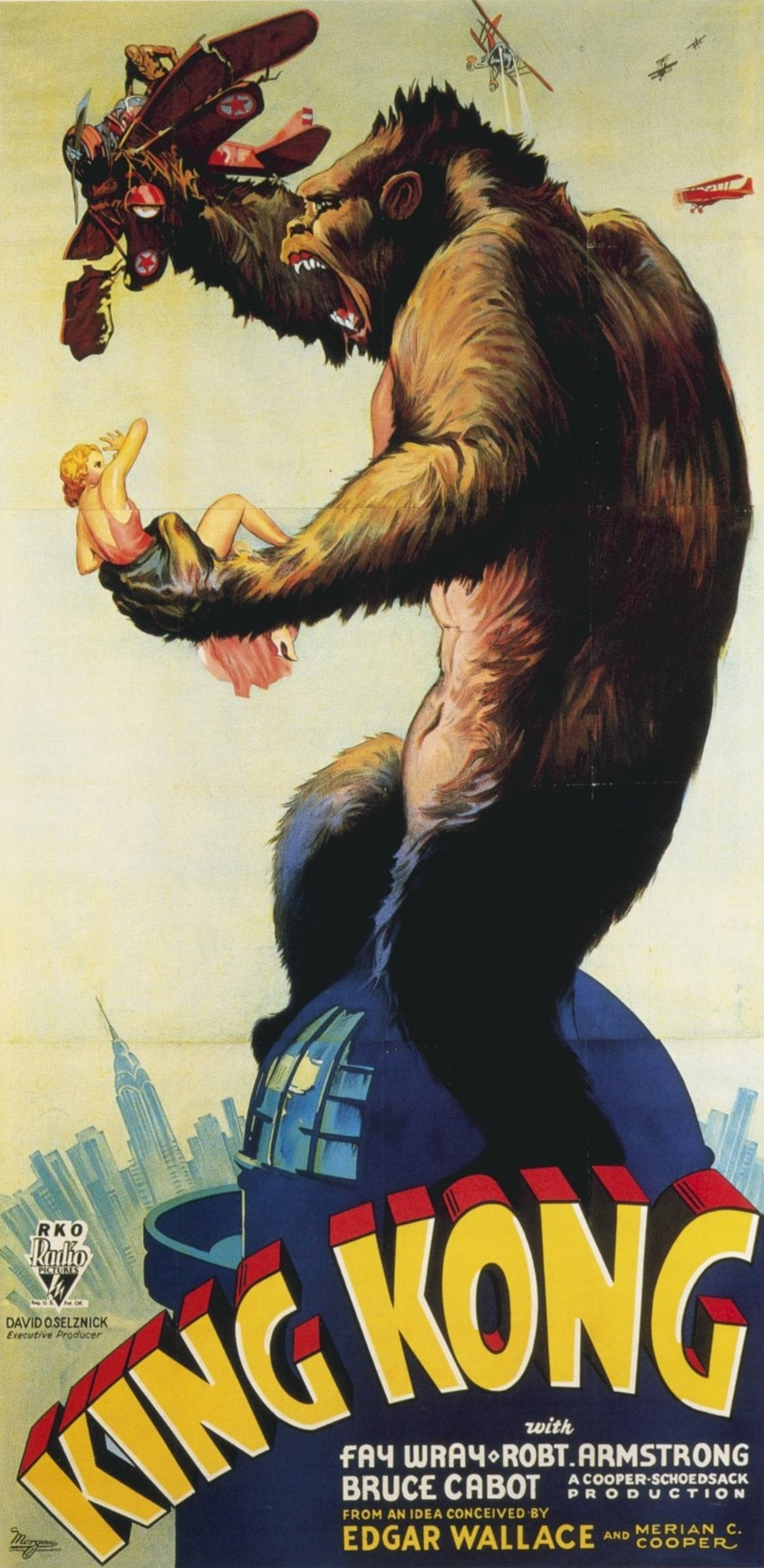
King Kong (1933) poster

While he worked in the Institute he met Willis O'Brien, who worked in special effects for movies in Hollywood. O'Brien was a specialist in building miniature creatures and sets as well as in stop-motion animation. Impressed by Delgado's work, he tried to lure him away to work with him on several occasions, offering four times more than the salary Delgado was making at the time. The answer was always the same, "I don't wanna work in the movies. I want to be an artist".

When O'Brien was about to tackle the biggest challenge in his career, The Lost World, he decided to make one last attempt to gain the services of the young Mexican sculptor. He invited him to spend a day in the First National studio where he was working. He walked Delgado through the whole place and then took him to the workshop where he did all the miniatures' work. "Welcome to your studio", he said, and eventually that became true. Delgado accepted the offer to work with O'Brien just to be able to work in such a place. Years later Delgado said the work area "was a clean, vast and organized place with cameras, lights, and all kind of materials. It was any artist's dream".

Delgado and O'Brien worked together for many years and soon became one of the most respected special effects crews in Hollywood. Their most famous and groundbreaking collaboration was the original King Kong, released in 1933. They refined these techniques in 1949's Mighty Joe Young, which garnered an Academy Award for special effects (awarded to O'Brien).

Delgado retired in 1965 and died on November 26, 1976, in Los Angeles, California.

== Films ==
O'Brien and Delgado's first work together was in The Lost World, but they became famous a few years later with King Kong (1933). Kong's success was followed by a failed sequel, Son of Kong. They also worked on movies like The Last Days of Pompeii (1935) and others.

- The Perils of Pauline (1967) - gorilla costume creator (uncredited)
- Fantastic Voyage (1966) - miniatures (uncredited)
- Mary Poppins (1964) - special effects props (uncredited)
- Dinosaurus! (1960) - dinosaur model constructor (uncredited)
- 20,000 Leagues Under the Sea (1954) - miniatures (uncredited)
- The War of the Worlds (1953) - miniatures (uncredited)
- Mighty Joe Young (1949) - technical staff
- The Wizard of Oz (1939) - miniatures (uncredited)
- The Last Days of Pompeii (1935) - miniatures (uncredited)
- Son of Kong (1933) - technical staff (as Marcell Delgado)
- King Kong (1933) - technical staff, model maker (uncredited), technician (uncredited)
- The Most Dangerous Game (1932) - special props (uncredited)
- Creation (1931 short) - miniatures
- The Lost World (1925) - associate technical director, associate researcher, model construction (uncredited)
