= The Animal World (film) =

- Theatrical release poster
- Directed by: Irwin Allen
- Written by: Irwin Allen
- Produced by: Irwin Allen
- Narrated by: Theodore Von Eltz
- Cinematography: Harold E. Wellman
- Edited by: Robert Belcher; Gene Palmer
- Music by: Paul Sawtell
- Distributed by: Warner Bros. Pictures
- Release date: May 30, 1956 (New York)
- Running time: 82 minutes
- Country: United States

The Animal World is a 1956 American comedy documentary film that was produced, written and directed by Irwin Allen. The film includes live-action footage of animals throughout the world featuring a light-hearted comedic voiceover. The film also incorporates a ten-minute stop motion animated sequence about dinosaurs.

Irwin's intention was to show the progression of life over time, although he noted, "We don't use the word 'evolution.' We hope to walk a very thin line. On one hand we want the scientists to say this film is right and accurate, and yet we don't want to have the church picketing the film."

== Dinosaur sequence ==
The special effects in the film's dinosaur sequence were produced by Ray Harryhausen and Willis O'Brien. Irwin originally planned to film the scenes as a series of static dioramas with plastic models, but Harryhausen suggested that the scenes would be more memorable if they were animated. The dinosaurs that appear include a Stegosaurus, a pair of Ceratosaurus, a Triceratops, a Tyrannosaurus (which doubles as an Allosaurus), and a female Brontosaurus, along with one of her hatchlings.

O’Brien built the dinosaur models and miniature landscapes while the actual animation was performed by Harryhausen. With the stop-motion dinosaur sequence scheduled for only six weeks of filming, Harryhausen used two cameras for the sequence to get more footage in less time, and in interviews after his retirement he stated he ran into a “censorship problem” (apparently with the Hays Office) because it was felt the dinosaur fights were too gruesome, even though, as Harryhausen pointed out, the film's live action sequences show fights between lions and gazelles and the like.

For many years, still shots from the segment were included in View-Master slide show reels. Some of the footage was reused for portions of the Night Gallery season 2 episode "The Painted Mirror," as well as in the 1970 film Trog, and the entire sequence was released as an extra on the 2003 DVD release of The Black Scorpion.

== Reception ==
The film ended up with a profit of over $500,000.

== Comic book adaptation ==
- Dell Four Color #713 (August 1956)

== See also ==
- List of films featuring dinosaurs
