= Willis H. O'Brien =

American special effects technician and animator (1886–1962)

Willis O'Brien
- O'Brien in 1931
- Born: Willis Harold O'Brien; March 2, 1886; Oakland, California, U.S.
- Died: November 8, 1962 (aged 76); Los Angeles, California, U.S.
- Resting place: Chapel of the Pines Crematory
- Other name: "Obie"
- Occupation: Stop motion model animator
- Years active: 1915–1962
- Spouse(s): Hazel Ruth Collette (1925–1930; divorce); Darlyne Prenett (1934–1962; his death)
- Children: 2
- Awards: Academy Award Best Visual Effects (1950); Winsor McCay Award (1997)

Willis Harold O'Brien (March 2, 1886 – November 8, 1962), known as Obie O'Brien, was an American motion picture special effects and stop-motion animation pioneer, who according to ASIFA-Hollywood "was responsible for some of the best-known images in cinema history," and is best remembered for his work on The Lost World (1925), King Kong (1933), The Last Days of Pompeii (1935) and Mighty Joe Young (1949), for which he won the 1950 Academy Award for Best Visual Effects.

== Biography ==
The Dinosaur and the Missing Link: A Prehistoric Tragedy (1917)

R.F.D. 10,000 B.C. (1916)

O'Brien was born in Oakland, California. He first left home at the age of eleven to work on cattle ranches, and again at the age of thirteen when he took on a variety of jobs including farmhand, factory worker, fur trapper, cowboy, and bartender. During this time he also competed in rodeos and developed an interest in dinosaurs while working as a guide to palaeontologists in Crater Lake region.

He spent his spare time sculpting and illustrating and his natural talent led to him being employed first as draftsman in an architect's office and then as a sports cartoonist for the San Francisco Daily News. During this time he also became a professional boxer, winning his first nine bouts but retiring after an unsuccessful tenth. He subsequently worked for the railroad, first as a brakeman and later a surveyor, as a professional marble sculptor, and was assistant to the head architect of the 1915 San Francisco World's Fair, where some of his work was displayed.

During this time he made models, including a dinosaur and a caveman, which he animated with the assistance of a local newsreel cameraman. San Francisco exhibitor Herman Wobber saw this 90-second test footage and commissioned O'Brien to make his first film, The Dinosaur and the Missing Link: A Prehistoric Tragedy (1915) for a budget of $5,000.

Thomas Edison was impressed by the film and O'Brien was hired by the Edison Company to animate a series of short films with a prehistoric theme, these included R.F.D. 10,000 B.C. and Prehistoric Poultry (both 1917) released as part of Conquest Pictures film packages for youth audiences. During this time he also worked on other Edison Company productions including Sam Loyd's The Puzzling Billboard and Nippy's Nightmare (both 1917), which were the first stop-motion films to combine live actors with stop motion models.

These films led to a commission from Herbert M. Dawley to write, direct, co-star and produce the effects for another dinosaur film, The Ghost of Slumber Mountain (1918), for a budget of $3,000. The collaboration was not a happy one and Dawley cut the 45-minute film down to 11 minutes and claimed credit for O'Brien's pioneering effects work, which combined realistic stop-motion animated prehistoric models with live action. The film grossed over $100,000 and Dawley used the cut effects footage in a sequel Along the Moonbeam Trail (1920) and the documentary Evolution (1923), but O'Brien received little financial reimbursement from this success.

Segment from the 1925 film The Lost World animated by O'Brien

The film however did help to secure his position on Harry O. Hoyt's The Lost World. For his early, short films O'Brien created his own characters out of clay, although for much of his feature career he would employ Richard and Marcel Delgado to create much more detailed stop-motion models (based on O'Brien's designs) with rubber skin built up over complex, articulated metal armatures. The models contained a bladder inside the skeleton model that could be inflated and deflated to give the illusion of breathing. Sir Arthur Conan Doyle, who appeared in the prologue to the film based on his novel of the same name, reportedly showed a reel of O'Brien's animation from the film to his friends, claiming it was real footage of living dinosaurs, to try to convince them that his story was based on fact.

O'Brien married Hazel Ruth Collette in 1925; they had two sons together, William and Willis Jr., but the marriage was an unhappy one. O'Brien was reportedly forced into it, and rebelled with drinking, gambling, and extra-marital affairs. The couple had divorced by 1930 and the two boys remained with their mother, who had begun to show unbalanced behaviour. By 1931, Hazel had been diagnosed with cancer and tuberculosis, while William also contracted tuberculosis, which resulted in blindness in one eye and then the other.

Throughout this time O'Brien worked with Hoyt on a series of canceled projects included Atlantis for First National studio, Frankenstein, and Creation for RKO Pictures, which was finally canceled in 1931 with only 20 minutes of effects footage to show for an estimated $120,000 development cost. The studio's head of production, Merian C. Cooper, had recommended the cancellation of O'Brien's project as he thought the story was boring but he was impressed by the effects work and saw how it could be used to facilitate the development of his own pet project about a giant gorilla battling Komodo dragons. O'Brien and the dinosaur models he had created for the canceled project were put to work on what was to become his best remembered film, the iconic King Kong (1933).

The Academy of Motion Picture Arts and Sciences (AMPAS) proposed giving O'Brien an Oscar for his technical effects on King Kong but Willis insisted that each of his crew also receive an Oscar statue, which the AMPAS refused to do, so O'Brien refused to accept the Oscar award for himself. This act of refusing his Oscar hurt O'Brien's reputation as a player in the Hollywood establishment, forever making him a semi-outsider in the industry, and thus whose own film proposals were seldom taken seriously. One of O'Brien's crew was Linwood G. Dunn, who did all of the optical composites for King Kong and Son of Kong (also 1933), and who was a future Treasurer and President of the AMPAS and who revealed this story in private conversations with various visual effects associates years later, long after O'Brien's death.

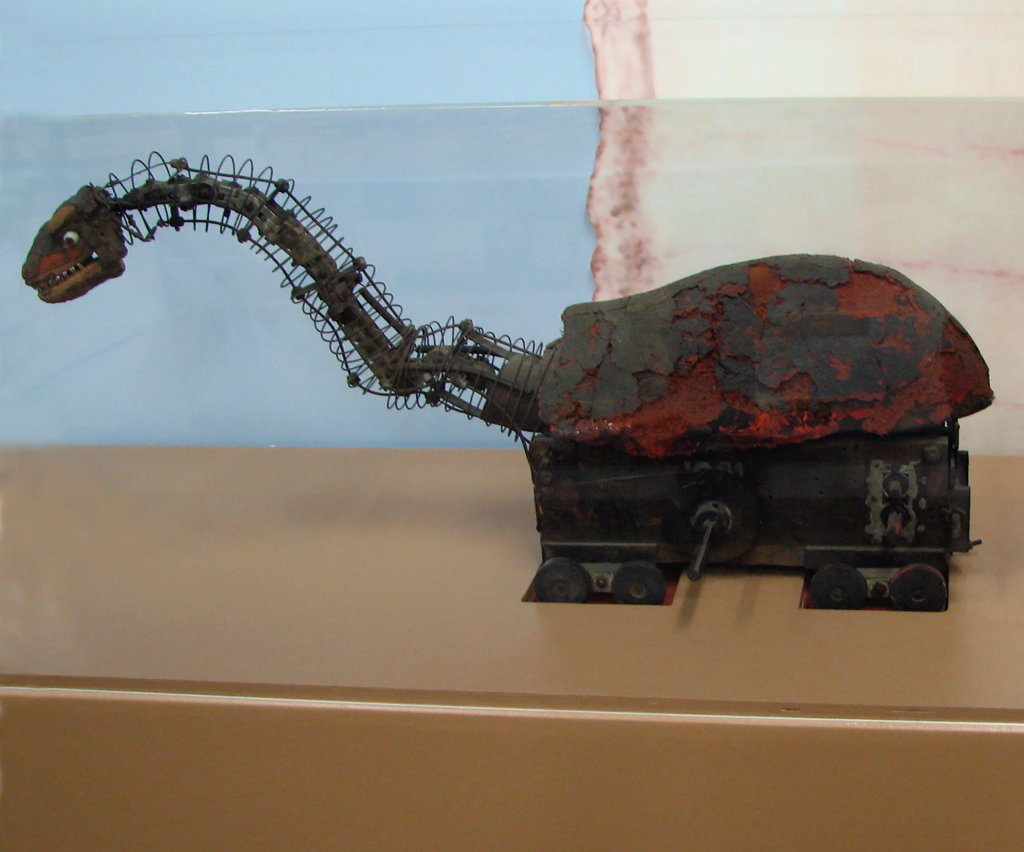
Brontosaurus stop motion armature from King Kong

The success of King Kong led to the studio commissioning the hurried sequel, which O'Brien described as cheesy. With a limited budget and a short production schedule, O'Brien chose to leave the animation work to his animation assistant, Buzz Gibson, and asked the studio not to credit him on the project. While making one of his daily visits to the set, O'Brien, who had remained close to his two sons after his separation from his estranged wife, invited Willis Jr. and the now completely blind William with him to handle the Kong and dinosaur models. A few weeks after this visit O'Brien's ex-wife, Hazel Ruth Collette, shot and killed William and Willis Jr. before turning the gun on herself. She survived the suicide attempt, and by draining her tubercular lung actually extended her life by another year. A publicity photo of O'Brien taken around this time shows the anguish on his face.

Hazel Ruth Collette remained in the Los Angeles General Hospital prison ward until her death in 1934. On November 17 that same year O'Brien married his second wife, Darlyne Prenett, with whom he remained until his death.

O'Brien continued to work with Merian C. Cooper at RKO on a number of projects including the epic The Last Days of Pompeii (1935) and Dancing Pirate (1936), which was O'Brien's first Technicolor production. The two also developed War Eagles about a race of Vikings riding on prehistoric eagles fighting with dinosaurs, but the project was cancelled when Cooper re-enlisted as a colonel in the U.S. Army Air Forces at the outset of World War II. O'Brien went on to do some special effects work, re-using one of the mattes from Son of Kong, on Orson Welles' Citizen Kane (1941) and George Pal's Oscar-nominated animated short Tulips Shall Grow (1942), as well as developing his own project, Gwangi, about cowboys who encounter a prehistoric animal in a "lost" valley, which he failed to sell to the studio.

Mighty Joe Young (1949), on which O'Brien is credited as Technical Creator, won an Academy Award for Best Visual Effects in 1950. Credit for the award went to the film's producers, RKO Productions, but O'Brien was also awarded a statue, this time proudly accepted by him. O'Brien was assisted by his protege (and successor) Ray Harryhausen and Pete Peterson on this film and, by some accounts, left the majority of the animation to them.

O'Brien and his wife developed Emilio and Guloso (aka, Valley of the Mist), about a Mexican boy and his pet bull who save their town from a dinosaur called "Lagarto Grande", which was optioned by producer Jesse L. Lasky Sr., with O'Brien and Harryhausen on board to do special effects, before falling through. O'Brien subsequently worked for Cooper at the new Cinerama corporation with plans to do a remake of King Kong using the new wide-screen techniques but ended up contributing a matte for the travelogue This Is Cinerama (1952) when this project also fell through. O'Brien worked with Harryhausen one last time on the dinosaur sequence for Irwin Allen's nature documentary The Animal World (1956). O'Brien's story ideas for Gwangi and Valley of the Mist were developed into Edward Nassour and Ismael Rodríguez's The Beast of Hollow Mountain (also 1956) but he did not work on the film's effects, which were the first to combine stop-motion and live-action in a color film. O'Brien also worked with Peterson again on The Black Scorpion (1957) and Behemoth, the Sea Monster (aka "The Giant Behemoth") (1959), but the two animators subsequently struggled to find other work.

Allen hired O'Brien as the effects technician on his remake of The Lost World (1960), but he was given little to do as the producer opted for live lizards instead of stop-motion animation for the dinosaurs. One of his story ideas King Kong vs. Frankenstein was developed into Ishirō Honda's King Kong vs. Godzilla (1962) but O'Brien was once again not involved in the production. Shortly before his death, he animated a brief scene for Linwood G. Dunn's "Film Effects of Hollywood" company in It's a Mad, Mad, Mad, Mad World (1963), featuring the male leads and secondary characters dangling from a fire escape and ladder, but he died before the film was released.

O'Brien died in Los Angeles on November 8, 1962. He was survived by his second wife, Darlyne. In 1997, he was posthumously awarded the Winsor McCay Award by ASIFA-Hollywood, the United States chapter of the International Animated Film Society ASIFA (Association internationale du film d'animation). The award is in recognition of lifetime or career contributions to the art of animation. His interment was located at Chapel of the Pines Crematory.

The film The Valley of Gwangi (1969), completed for Warner Bros. by Harryhausen seven years after O'Brien's death, was based on an idea the latter had spent years trying to bring to the screen. O'Brien wrote the script for an earlier version of the story, which was released as The Beast of Hollow Mountain (US 1956), but O'Brien did not handle the effects for that movie.

O'Brien's work was celebrated in March 1983 with the appearance of his wife, Darlene, at a 50th-anniversary event commemorating the day of the first screening of the film at Graumann's (later Mann's) Chinese Theater on Hollywood Boulevard, complete with a screening of a new print of King Kong and a new recreation of the full-scale bust of Kong that appeared 50 years apart at both events in the outdoor lobby of the theater. Three articles in the August 1983 issue of American Cinematographer magazine detailed the 1983 anniversary event.

In March 1984, O'Brien's work was the subject of a special exhibit at the Kaiser Center in Oakland, California. This exhibit included many sketches, artifacts, and photographs from O'Brien's personal collection, some of which had never been seen in public.

In 2005, Peter Jackson produced and directed King Kong. It was filmed in New Zealand and featured visual effects by Weta Digital. It was dedicated to O'Brien and the other key contributors to the original film.

== Filmography ==
=== Silent shorts ===
The Ghost of Slumber Mountain (1918)

Herman Webber production, later sold to Edison:

- The Dinosaur and the Missing Link: A Prehistoric Tragedy (1915) (Reissued in 1917 as The Dinosaur and the Baboon by Edison's Conquest Pictures)

Edison Studio's Conquest Pictures (half-reel shorts):

- Morpheus Mike (1917) (Made in 1915)
- Prehistoric Poultry, The Dinornis or Great Roaring Whiffenpoof (1916) (Note: On page 43 of the book The Making of King Kong: The Story Behind a Film Classic it's mentioned there are two versions of this film.)
- The Birth of a Flivver (1917) (made in 1916)
- R.F.D. 10,000 B.C.: A Mannikin Comedy (1917) full-reel short
- Curious Pets of Our Ancestors (1917)

Unknown releases:

- In the Villain's Power (1917)
- Mickey's Naughty Nightmares (1917)
  - The Nippy's Nightmare and Mickey and his Goat segments. (The first film to combine stop motion and live action).
- Sam Lloyd's Famous Puzzles (1917)
  - The Puzzling Billboard segment

Herbert M. Dawley Productions:

- The Ghost of Slumber Mountain (1918) 2 reels
- Along the Moonbeam Trail (1920) 1 reel

=== Feature films ===
- The Lost World (1925)
- King Kong (1933)
- Son of Kong (1933)
- She (1934, preproduction)
- The Last Days of Pompeii (1935)
- Dancing Pirate (1936, matte painting)
- Going My Way (1944, matte paintings)
- The Bells of St. Mary's (1945, matte paintings)
- The Miracle of the Bells (1948, matte paintings)
- Mighty Joe Young (1949, Academy Award winner)
- This Is Cinerama (1952)
- The Animal World (1956)
- The Beast of Hollow Mountain (1956, O'Brien worked on screenplay only)
- The Black Scorpion (1957)
- The Giant Behemoth (1959, a.k.a. Behemoth, the Sea Monster)
- The Lost World (1960)
- It's a Mad, Mad, Mad, Mad World (1963, posthumous release)

=== Short films ===
- Tulips Shall Grow (1942, Academy Award nominated)

=== Story by ===
- The Beast of Hollow Mountain (1956) *
- King Kong vs. Godzilla (1962)
- The Valley of Gwangi (1969) - based on O'Brien's unproduced Gwangi (1941)

=== Abandoned project ===
- Creation (1931) – Abandoned feature by RKO due to expense and pace. 20 minutes of completed sequences didn't show enough action to warrant a feature film. (Completed footage later released as an 11-minute short in 16mm rental)

=== Unrealized projects ===
- Atlantis (1927): Developed by O'Brien and Harry Hoyt after the success of 1925's The Lost World.
- Frankenstein (1928): Originally considered in 1928, and it would be announced by Willis O'Brien himself in 1934, this would've been an adaptation of the Marry Shelley novel of the same name. The idea of Frankenstein would later be re-used for King Kong vs. Frankenstein after not much went through after that.
- The New Adventures of King Kong (1933): Set during the events of the first King Kong (1933) when Kong was being transported to New York City on the Venture. But due to the underperformance of Son of Kong (1933), the project was dropped.
- The Food of the Gods (1934): Based on the 1904 novel by H. G. Wells, Willis O'Brien planned on adapting the book into film form, but failed to gain interest. Ray Harryhausen would later try his hand in making it into a film in 1961, but the project was dropped again.
- War Eagles (1939): A young WWII pilot crashes in a hidden valley in the Arctic inhabited by dinosaurs and the descendants of a Viking tribe who ride on giant eagles called Erns. He becomes a part of the tribe and helps them defeat a rampaging Allosaurus herd. When he hears that New York City is under attack by Nazis, he convinces them to aid him in his fight against them. A battle between giant eagles, planes, and zeppelins occurs over the city. It would later be adapted into two novels made by Carl Macek and David Conover in 2008 and 2011 respectively.
- Valley of the Mist (1950): Originally titled Emilio and Guloso, then El Toro Estrella (The Star Bull), the story tells of a boy and his pet bull who save their town from a Allosaurus called Lagarto Grande (the Great Lizard). In later drafts the story would have involved men vs. dinosaurs. This would later be reworked into The Valley of Gwangi (1969).
- The Last of the Oso Si-Papu (1950): An earthquake opens a fissure to the legendary Third World of the Hopi Indians, Kuskurza. A world populated by prehistoric monsters. When the Oso Si Papu, a 20-foot monster bear with Gila Monster-like skin threatens a small town, a group of movie makers, some archaeologists, and the local police must find a way to stop the ravaging monster. Special effects artist and author of "Willis O'Brien: Special Effects Genius" Steve Archer has attempted to make this film back in the 1990's, but to no avail.
- The 8th Wonder (1952): A proposed remake of the original King Kong. After the original King Kong was successful re-released in America in 1952, Merian C. Cooper began thinking about the viability of bringing Kong to the Cinerama process in some form. He brought in Willis O'Brien to help develop the project, and Cinerama employee Cunningham to create a new camera system that could capture stop-motion in the widescreen format. However, the project was dropped.
- Umbah (1950s): Treatment by O'Brien about the Lovelock Cave. A second cave system is found behind the Lovelock Cave. When explored a hidden valley is found with large animals, and two giants, Umbah and Tavotz.
- The Last of the Labyrinthodons (1954): Modern-day sea monsters from prehistoric times attack ships.
- King Kong vs. Frankenstein (1958–61): The descendants of Carl Denham and Victor Frankenstein cross paths with Kong and Frankenstein. The two battle each other in San Francisco and fall from the Golden Gate Bridge. Eventually turned into King Kong vs. Godzilla (1962) by Toho Co,.LTD, who purchased the rights to the film from John Beck, to which Willis O'Brien did not find out until production was already released in theaters.
- Elephant Rustlers (1960): About a hunt for elephant thieves in Burma, where the heroes are threatened by giant ferocious lizards.
- The Bubbles (1960–1962): Giant tentacled jellyfish-like creatures appear in Baja, California and start eating up anything in their path.
- Baboon: A Tale about a Yeti (1962): Set in the Himalayas, an expedition finds a yeti and decides to bring it back to civilization.
- The Vines of Ceres – A remote mining operation on the asteroid Ceres sends a deadly sample back to earth that may destroy all of mankind. A follow-up crewed mission discovers the truth behind the deadly attack on the Earth and why it was a planned extinction event all along.

== Bibliography ==
- Archer, Steve. Willis O'Brien: Special Effects Genius. McFarland & Company: Jefferson, 1993.
- Shay, Don. "Willis O'Brien: Creator of the Impossible." Cinefex 7, Jan. 1982, pp. 4–71.
- Neri, Gilberto, Silent Dinosaurs. Prehistoric Creatures in Early Cinema, 2026, pp. 167, ISBN 979-8180737540
