= Lincoln and Parker Film Company =

The Lincoln and Parker Film Company was a short-lived film company established in Worcester, Massachusetts. It acquired assets and films from Thomas A. Edison, Inc. including Conquest Pictures programs. Its New York studio was at 2826 Decatur Avenue, Bronx, NY when Thomas Edison exited his struggling film production business. Originally built for silent films, the facility was upgraded for sound in 1930, and continued in operation until the 1960s.

Edison's son Charles Edison was to serve on the acquiring firm's board of directors. Thomas Edison was to be a consulting editor. The deal also included equipment from the Edison Positive plant in Orange, New Jersey and a million feet of negatives.

Violoncellist Harrison Gibbs Prentice worked for the company.

== Filmography ==
- Chicago Stock Yards (1917), a newsreel clipping
- Cotton Manufacture (1917), a newsreel clipping
- The Canadian Rockies (1917), a newsreel clipping
