= The Ghost of Slumber Mountain =

1918 film by Willis H. O'Brien and Herbert M. Dawley

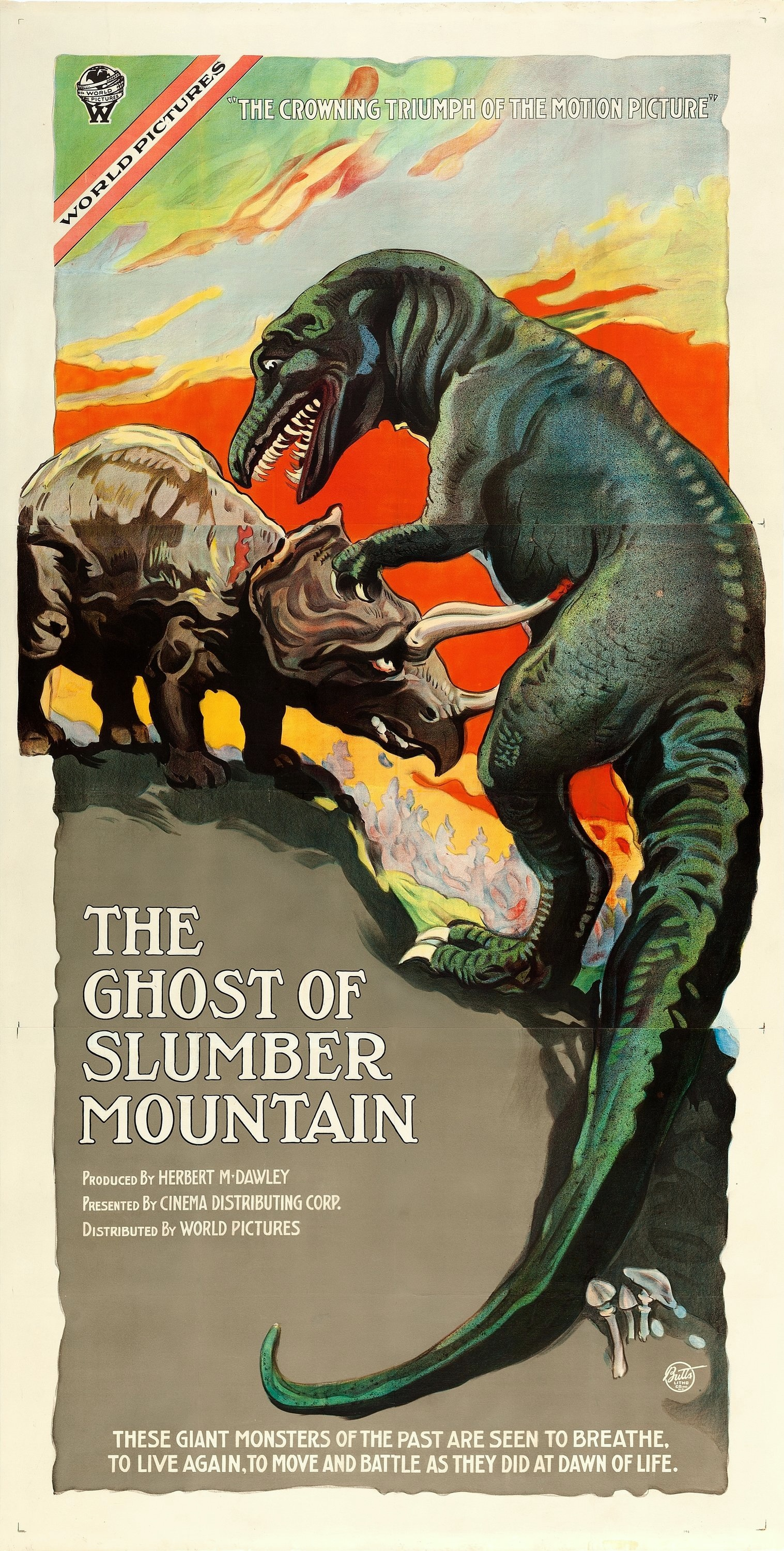
- Theatrical poster to The Ghost of Slumber Mountain
- Directed by: Willis O'Brien
- Written by: Willis O'Brien
- Produced by: Herbert M. Dawley
- Starring: Herbert M. Dawley; Willis O'Brien
- Cinematography: Willis O'Brien
- Distributed by: World Film Company
- Release date: November 17, 1918
- Running time: 40 minutes (original, lost); 19 minutes (restored version)
- Country: United States
- Languages: Silent; English intertitles
- Budget: $3,000
- Box office: $100,000

The Ghost of Slumber Mountain is a 1918 film written and directed by special effects pioneer Willis O'Brien, produced by Herbert M. Dawley, and starring both men. It is the first film to show live actors and stop-motion creatures together on the screen and is often cited as a trial run for The Lost World. An advertising tagline for the film read "These giant monsters of the past are seen to breathe, to live again, to move and battle as they did at dawn of life." [sic] The film attracted the interest of Watterson R. Rothacker, founder of the Industrial Motion Picture Company, who was so impressed by the film's special effects, he joined forces with O'Brien to create the dinosaurs of The Lost World (1925), a classic that advanced the development of special effects techniques.

The Ghost of Slumber Mountain originally took up 3000 feet of film and three reels, equivalent to approximately 40 minutes. However, after the film premiered at the Strand Theater, manager Walter Hayes ordered Dawley to cut the film down to about one reel because it was too long. At one point, the film was cut down to 12 minutes by the producer, and for years this shortened version was the only one thought to exist, but it was eventually restored back to 19 minutes. The rest of the footage is presumed to be lost. The film is available as a supplementary material item on the 2017 The Lost World Blu-ray disc from Flicker Alley. The supplementary material includes The Ghost of Slumber Mountain in a new 2K HD restoration by the "Dinosaur Museum", although one source lists the film's running time at less than 14 minutes. The film as presented on the Flicker Alley Blu-ray runs thirteen minutes after the opening restoration credits are finished.

Researcher Christopher Workman wrote "It has been suggested that the missing footage was deemed too homosexual in subtext, an idea borne out by a scene that did get restored....(in which) Jack tries to persuade Joe to remove his clothes and pose as a faun, but Joe refuses... because there are too many mosquitoes around." (Oddly, the actor who played Joe in the film is unknown.)

Barnum Brown, the renowned dinosaur hunter who discovered Tyrannosaurus rex, was a technical advisor on the film. O'Brien based the dinosaur models used in the film on the paintings of paleoartist Charles R. Knight.

Producer Dawley had hired O'Brien to write, direct, co-star and produce the effects for Slumber Mountain, for a budget of $3,000. The collaboration was not a happy one, and Dawley wound up cutting the 45-minute film down to 12 minutes and claimed credit for much of O'Brien's pioneering effects work on the film. Dawley then used a lot of the cut effects footage in a sequel Along the Moonbeam Trail (1920) and his 1923 documentary Evolution. O'Brien received very little financial reimbursement from the project.

== Plot ==
A scene from the remaining footage

Most of the full plot is unknown. Author and explorer Jack Holmes (Dawley) tells his two young nephews about an adventure he had in the woodlands around Slumber Mountain, near the Valley of Dreams. Jack and his partner Joe (along with their dog Soxie) find a cabin belonging to the late hermit Mad Dick, who Joe once saw carrying a strange telescope-like instrument. That night at their campsite, Jack imagines a voice calling to him which leads him back to the old hermit's cabin. Jack searches the cabin and finds the instrument. Upon doing so, the ghost of Mad Dick (O'Brien) appears and instructs him to use it to look at the peak of Slumber Mountain. The device allows him to look back into the past, seeing a Brontosaurus followed by a strange small winged bird eating a snake. Two Triceratops fight before his eyes, then a Tyrannosaurus kills and partially eats one of the Triceratops. The triumphant beast notices Jack and begins chasing him. Jack shoots the animal to no avail. Just as the creature is about to pounce upon him, Jack wakes up to find himself next to his still sleeping friend Joe at the campsite. It is then revealed that Jack had dreamed it all. The children then tackle him for thinking up such a good tall tale.

== Cast ==
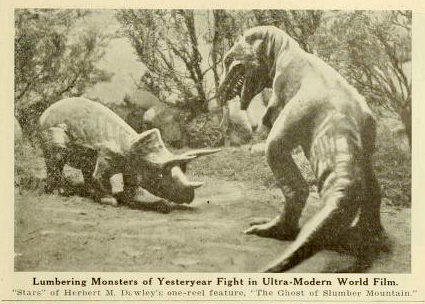
Photograph depicting the fight between the Triceratops and Tyrannosaurus in the film (1919)

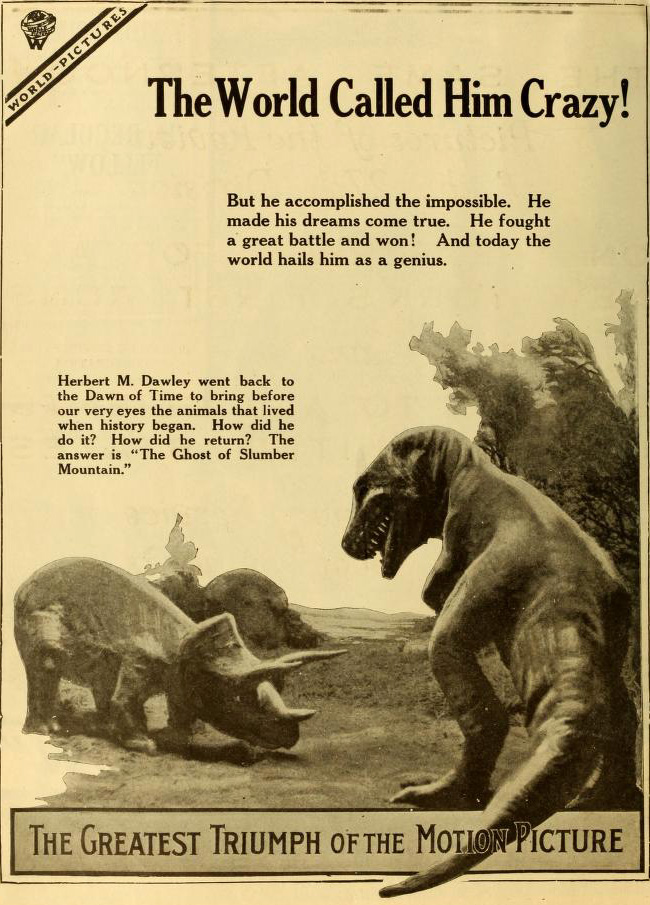
Advertisement (1919)

- Herbert M. Dawley as Jack Holmes, Author / Explorer
- Willis O'Brien as Dick "Mad Dick", The Hermit
- Alan Day and Chauncey Day as The Two Nephews
- Soxie the dog as Himself

== Prehistoric creatures featured ==
- Brontosaurus
- Giant Bird (possibly Phorusrhacos or Gastornis)
- Triceratops
- Tyrannosaurus
- Pteranodon

== Reception ==
The Ghost of Slumber Mountain was a box office hit, grossing over $100,000 on a $3,000 budget. The New York Times called the animated dinosaurs "remarkably lifelike". Variety stated "These dinosaurs....walk, twist, gaze and eat as we might imagine they must have in the long, long, long ago".

The film is available as a supplementary material item on the 2017 The Lost World Blu-ray disc from Flicker Alley. The supplementary material includes The Ghost of Slumber Mountain in a new 2K HD restoration by the "Dinosaur Museum".

What remains of The Ghost of Slumber Mountain was preserved by the Academy Film Archive in 2012.

The scene of the Tyrannosaurus fighting the Triceratops was featured in 3-D Dinosaur Adventure, where it was dubbed over by voice actors to give it a more humorous tone.

== See also ==
- List of films featuring dinosaurs
- List of incomplete or partially lost films
