= Every Boy's Library (Boy Scouts of America Edition) =

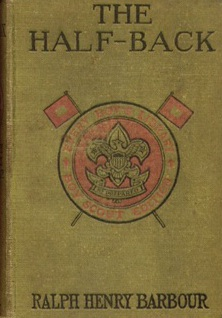
- The Half Back by Ralph Henry Barbour
- Edited by: Boy Scouts of America
- Country: United States
- Language: English
- Publisher: Grosset & Dunlap
- Published: November 1912 to mid-1930s
- Media type: Print
- No. of books: 73

The Every Boy's Library: Boy Scout Edition refers to a collection of 73 books that were published under the backing of the Boy Scouts of America. Every title was selected by the Scouts Library Commission, and were branded towards Scouts and included themes that would be of interest to young boys in the Scouting movement. These re-released many classic novels as well as newer works by those associated with the Scouting movement, include Ernest Thompson Seton and Daniel Carter Beard. This series of reprints was published by Grosset & Dunlap from November 1912 with reprints and editions lasting until the mid-1930s. Each edition includes a letter "To The Public" by then Chief Scout Executive James E. West. 30 original works were commissioned, as referenced by the original list in the back page of each edition.

== Background ==
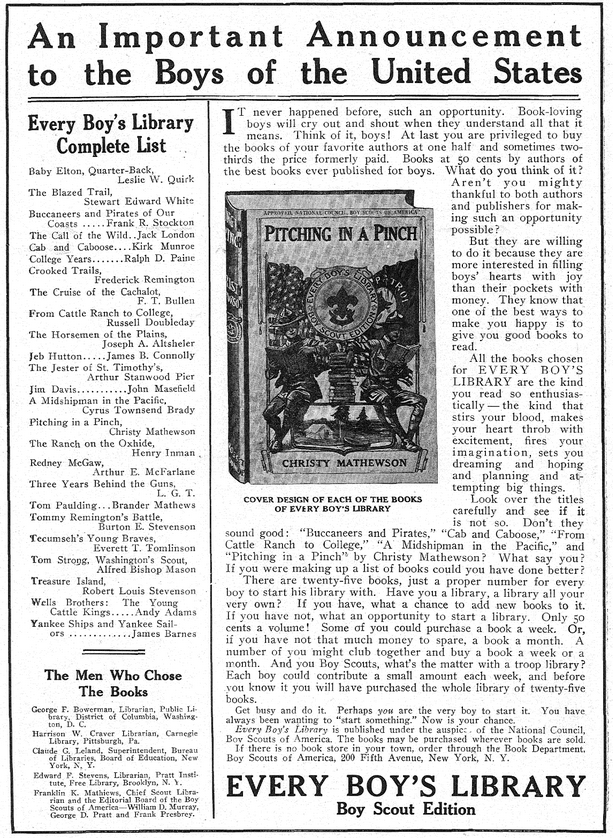
November 1913 Every Boy's Library Advertisement of the Series in Boy's Life

In the early 1900s, cheap novels were flooding the market with often content was as of low quality. These were known as "Nickel Novels" or "Dime Novels" based on the price of these books. Some of these books were aimed at children and youth and some parents were concerned that this would corrupt the minds of their children. This was a view shared by leaders of the Boy Scouts of America as shared in the Fourth Annual Report of the Boy Scouts of America 1913. According to Franklin K. Mathiews, Chief Scout Librarian, Judge Ben B. Lindsey had judged a case involving a gang of boys. Hundreds of "cheap juveniles" (cheap books for the youth) were found in their possession and which corrupted them. In addition, the popularity of Scouting was noticed by authors and publishers who published numerous books with Scouts as characters, and judged of poor by Boy Scouts of America.

In response to this, a Library Commission was formed within the organization. It initially was made up of:

- George F. Bowerman, Librarian at the Public Library in Washington, D.C.
- Harrison W. Craver, Librarian at Carnegie library in Pittsburgh, PA
- Claude G. Leland, Superintendent at the Bureau of Libraries for the New York City Board of Education
- Edward P. Stevens, Librarian at the Pratt Institute's Free Library in Brooklyn, NY
- Franklin K. Mathiews, Chief Scout Librarian and Secretary
- The Editorial Board of the Boy Scouts of America: William D. Murray, George D. Pratt, and Frank Presbrey.

The collection would only contain books that "are of interest to boys". The first 25 volumes would be "works of fiction or stirring stories of adventurous experiences" while later ones may contain more serious material. These books were reprints of popular books previously sold for $1.00 to $1.50. With the assistance of the various original publishers, the Boy Scouts of America was able to reprint these works for 50 cents a volume. Merchandising was handled by Grosset and was widely distributed. It was well received by librarians, public school teachers, authors, publishers and booksellers. The first books were placed on sale in November 1912 and 71,000 were sold in only six weeks.

In parallel to the publication of this new collection, Boy Scouts of America offered a recommendation service for parents who struggled to find quality books for their boys. It was announced by Boy Scouts of America and shared in the pages of Ladies' Home Journal, Woman's Home Companion and The Delineator that if parents sent a letter to the Boy Scouts of America National Headquarters with "descriptions of their boys-age, interests, temperament, attainments, moral qualifications, faults or delinquencies giving some idea of how the boys are inclined to spend their leisure time and the characteristics of the boys with whom they like best to associate" "a course of reading would be prescribed" by the Consulting Book Physician containing quality books.

State Library Commissions in Wisconsin, Indiana, Massachusetts, New York and New Jersey were very interested in the work of this Commission. It was believed that this reading list could be used by public libraries and public schools as the best books for boys.

The work of the Library Commission in their selection of the Every Boy's Library books can be seen in the following paragraph on page 64 of the Report:
While the boy is growing rapidly in brain and body that is the time to give him the stories in which heroes have the characteristics the boy so much admires-men of unquenchable courage, immense resourcefulness, absolute fidelity, conspicuous greatness; the men who do things, big things, wonderful things; the men who conquer and overcome in the face of the heaviest odds, who never turn their back but march breast forward "to do or die." For the boys, that spirit is the stuff of which great manhood is made; and, if with books we would profoundly influence him, we must constantly challenge him with stories of astonishing accomplishments, biographies that hold him spellbound, wonder tales of almost unattainable undertakings achieved.

With this in mind, hundreds of such books were selected to be first published in the Handbook for Boys and provided later to libraries across America for a nominal sum. The Commission also wished to work with Sunday School libraries and with "welfare workers" working with the "juvenile criminal class".

On July 31st, 1913, James E. West, Chief Scout Executive issued a letter to the public announcing the collection. It explained the goal of the collection and thanked the publishers and the Commission for their work in making this collection a reality. It was reprinted in Library Journals and can be found in some copies of the collection.

Price would not remain at 50 cents a volume but would slowly increase. It was listed at 75 cents in 1917. It would reach $1.00 by 1920.

== Finish ==
An early cover featured seen in some ads shows two Scouts in uniform reading books with a pile of books between them. Above was the Every Boy's Library/Boy Scout Edition with the fleur-de-lis with the Flag of the United States on its right and a Patrol flag on its left.

Later, the books featured an olive-green, linen fabric hard cover and bore a seal red and black fleur-de-lis Boy Scout emblem over two crossed signal flags, with the title at the top and the author on the bottom. Some works included an original dust jacket, however, intact copies are increasingly rare. There are also several versions that do not display a BSA seal, but rather have different colored hardcovers with or without an embossed seal on the spine. The series was sold as a fundraiser for the BSA and were sold for fifty cents each.

== Book List ==
The following books were in the collection:

- Adventures in Beaver Stream Camp (Arthur Radclyffe Dugmore)
- Along the Mohawk Trail (Percy Keese Fitzhugh)
- Animal Heroes (Ernest Thompson Seton)
- Baby Elton, Quarter-Back (Leslie W. Quirk)
- Bartley, Freshman Pitcher (William Heyliger)
- Be Prepared The Boy Scouts in Florida (Anthony Weston Dimock)
- Ben-Hur (General Lew Wallace)
- Billy Topsail M.D., A Tale of with Doctor Luke of the Labrador (Norman Duncan)
- The Biography of a Grizzly (Ernest Thompson Seton)
- The Blazed Trail (Stewart Edward White)
- Boat Building and Boating (Dan Beard)
- The Boy Scouts of Black Eagle Patrol (Leslie W. Quirk)
- Boy Scouts of Bob's Hill (Charles Pierce Burton)
- The Boy's Book of New Inventions (Harry E. Maule)
- Brown Wolf and Other Stories (Jack London)
- Buccaneers and Pirates of Our Coast (Frank R. Stockton)
- Cab and Caboose (Kirk Munroe)
- The Call of the Wild (Jack London)
- Cattle Ranch to College (Russell Doubleday)
- College Years (Ralph D. Paine)
- Crooked Trails (Frederic Remington)
- The Cruise of the Cachalot (Frederick T. Bullen)
- The Cruise of the Dazzler (Jack London)
- Danny Fists (Walter Camp)
- Don Strong Patrol Leader (William Heyliger)
- Don Strong of the Wolf Patrol (William Heyliger)
- For the Honor of the School (Ralph Henry Barbour)
- The Gaunt Grey Wolf (Dillon Wallace)
- Grit A-Plenty (Dillon Wallace)
- A Gunner Aboard the Yankee (Russell Doubleday)
- The Guns of Europe (Joseph A. Altsheler)
- The Half-Back (Ralph Henry Barbour)
- Handbook for Boys (Revised Edition) (Boy Scouts of America)
- Handicraft for Outdoor Boys (Dan Beard)
- The Horsemen of the Plains (Joseph A. Altsheler)
- Jeb Hutton (James B. Connolly)
- The Jester of St. Timothy's (Arthur Stanwood Pier)
- Jim Davis (John Masefield)
- Indian Boyhood (Charles A. Eastman)
- Kidnapped (Robert Louis Stevenson)
- Lone Bull's Mistake - A Lodgepole Chief Story (James Willard Schultz)
- The Last of the Chiefs (Joseph A. Altsheler)
- The Last of the Mohicans (James Fenimore Cooper)
- The Last of the Plainsmen (Zane Grey)
- A Midshipman in the Pacific (Cyrus Townsend Brady)
- Pete the Cowpuncher (Joseph Bushnell Ames)
- Pitching in a Pinch (Christy Matthewson)
- The Quest of the Fish-dog Skin (James Willard Schultz)
- The Ranche of the Oxhide (Henry Inman)
- Ransom of Red Chief and Other O. Henry Stories for Boys (O. Henry)
- Redney McGraw (Arthur E. McFarlane)
- Scouting with Daniel Boone (Everett T. Tomlinson)
- Scouting with General Funston (Everett T. Tomlinson)
- Scouting with Kit Carson (Everett T. Tomlinson)
- Tecumseh's Young Braves (Everett T. Tomlinson)
- Three Years Behind the Guns (Lieu. John B. Tisdale)
- Through College on Nothing a Year (Christian Gauss)
- To the Land of the Caribou (Paul Tomlinson)
- Tom Paulding (Brander Matthews)
- Tom Strong, Washington's Scout (Alfred Bishop Mason)
- Tommy Remington's Battle (Burton E. Stevenson)
- Treasure Island (Robert Louis Stevenson)
- 20,000 Leagues Under the Seas (Jules Verne)
- Elliott Gray, Jr.: A Chronicle of School Life (Colton Maynard)
- Under Boy Scout Colors (Joseph Bushnell Ames)
- Ungava Bob (Dillon Wallace)
- Wells Brothers: The Young Cattle Kings (Andy Adams)
- Williams of the West Point (Hugh L. Johnson)
- The Wireless Man (Francis Arnold Collins)
- The Wolf Hunters (George Bird Gannell)
- The Wrecking Master (Ralph D. Paine)
- Yankee Ships and Yankee Sailors (James Barnes)

== Collecting ==
Updated texts are available outlining the complete collection, however Boy Scout collectors frequently reference the rare Kahunas Katalog of the Every Boy's Library – privately published by Joseph Pratt Price, Jr. in 1990. This 538-page scholarly work of investigative bibliographical research provides extensive notes and detailed explanations of variations, printings and editions of all 73 titles in the series. It includes an explanation of the history of the series originally intended as a method of fund raising by the Boy Scouts of America. This work also includes a guide for estimating values of the books in this series, however it has remained elusive as many Boy Scout collectors refuse to share or assimilate the copyrighted work. They are currently valued on average at ten dollars to most collectors.

In 2014, was published The Every Boy's Library Collector's Guide: A Reference for Boy Scouts of America Memorabilia by Michael Fazzino.
