= James A. Wilder =

American artist (1868–1934)

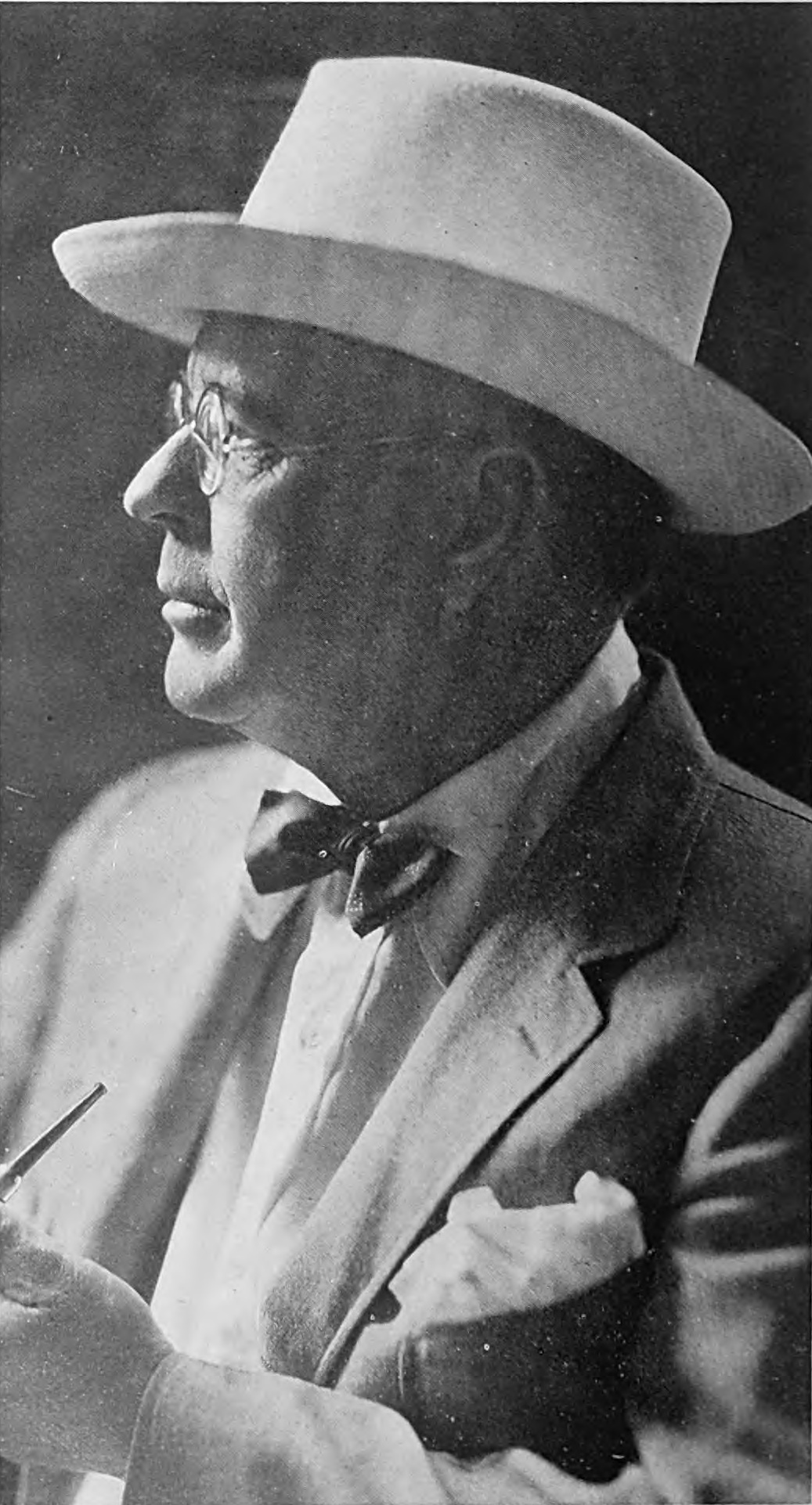

James Austin (Kimo) Wilder (May 22, 1868 – July 4, 1934) was an artist, writer, and scouting pioneer in Hawaii. Wilder was born on May 22, 1868, in Honolulu, Hawaii, the son of shipping magnate Samuel Gardner Wilder. He had five siblings.

Wilder attended Harvard University and Harvard Law School in 1893–1896. Wilder married Sarah Harnden September 12, 1899, in Alameda, California and had two children. His daughter Kinaʻu Wilder (1902–1992) married Charles B. McVay III and had son Kimo Wilder McVay (1927–2001), who managed Don Ho when he popularized the song Tiny Bubbles.

== Background ==
Wilder became an artist and founded the first Boy Scout troop in Hawaii with D. Howard Hitchcock, another artist who married Wilder's cousin.

Wilder was active in Hawaii Scouting and traveled to the eastern United States where he developed Seascouting for older teen scouts and the Pine Tree Patrol System. Seascouting was introduced in 1919.

The James A. Wilder Residence built in 1907 in Honolulu is historic.

In 1917, Wilder wrote a story titled Knights of the Square Table. This was adapted into a Conquest Pictures film of the same title, in which Wilder played a scoutmaster. The film is held by the Library of Congress.

He composed the song, A Sea Scout Chantey.

He painted a portrait of Prince Kuhio that hangs in the 'Iolani Palace's throne room and painted U.S. Congressman William D. Thomas.

Wilder died on July 4, 1934, in Honolulu.

== Bibliography ==
- Jack-Knife Cookery.
- The Pine Tree Patrol.
- Knights of the Square Table.
