= Ralph Henry Barbour =

American writer

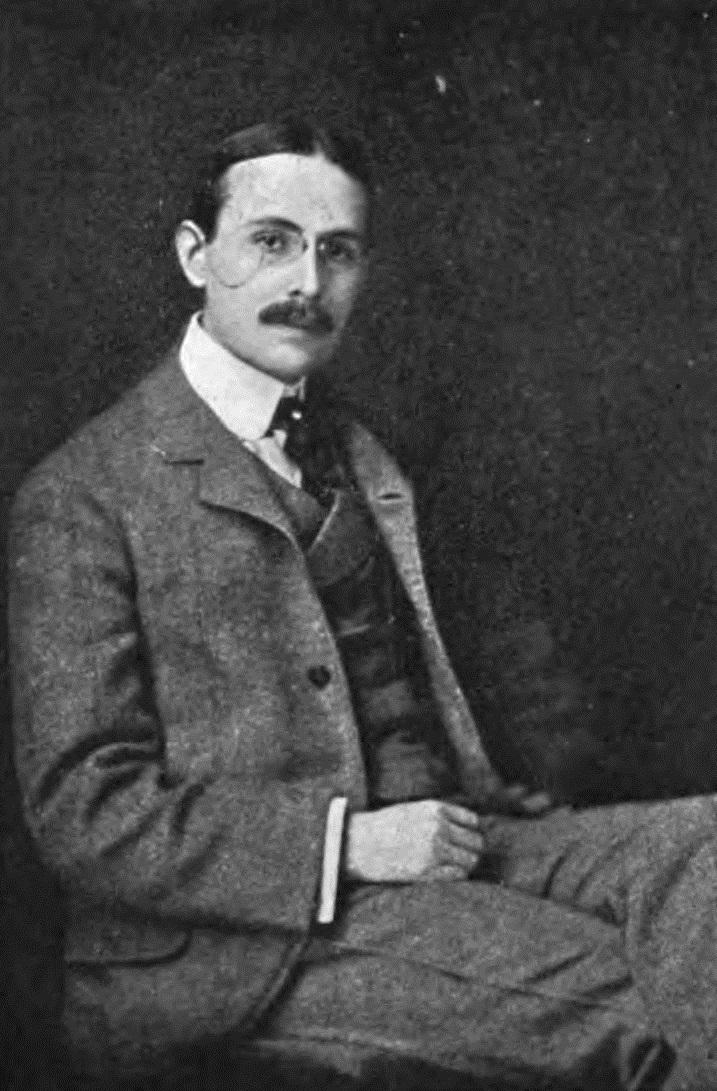
- Born: November 13, 1870
- Died: February 19, 1944 (aged 73)
- Writing career
- Language: English
- Genre: Young adult fiction

Ralph Henry Barbour (November 13, 1870, in Cambridge, Massachusetts– February 19, 1944) was an American novelist, who primarily wrote popular works of sports fiction for boys. In collaboration with L. H. Bickford, he also wrote as Richard Stillman Powell, notably Phyllis in Bohemia. Other works included light romances and adventure.

== Biography ==
During his career, Barbour produced more than 100 novels as well as a number of short stories.

== Sports ==
In 1904 book publisher D. Appleton & Co. issued several sports books with editor Ralph Henry Barbour using information from prior Spalding Athletic Library books by special arrangement from American Sports Publishing.

== Selected works ==
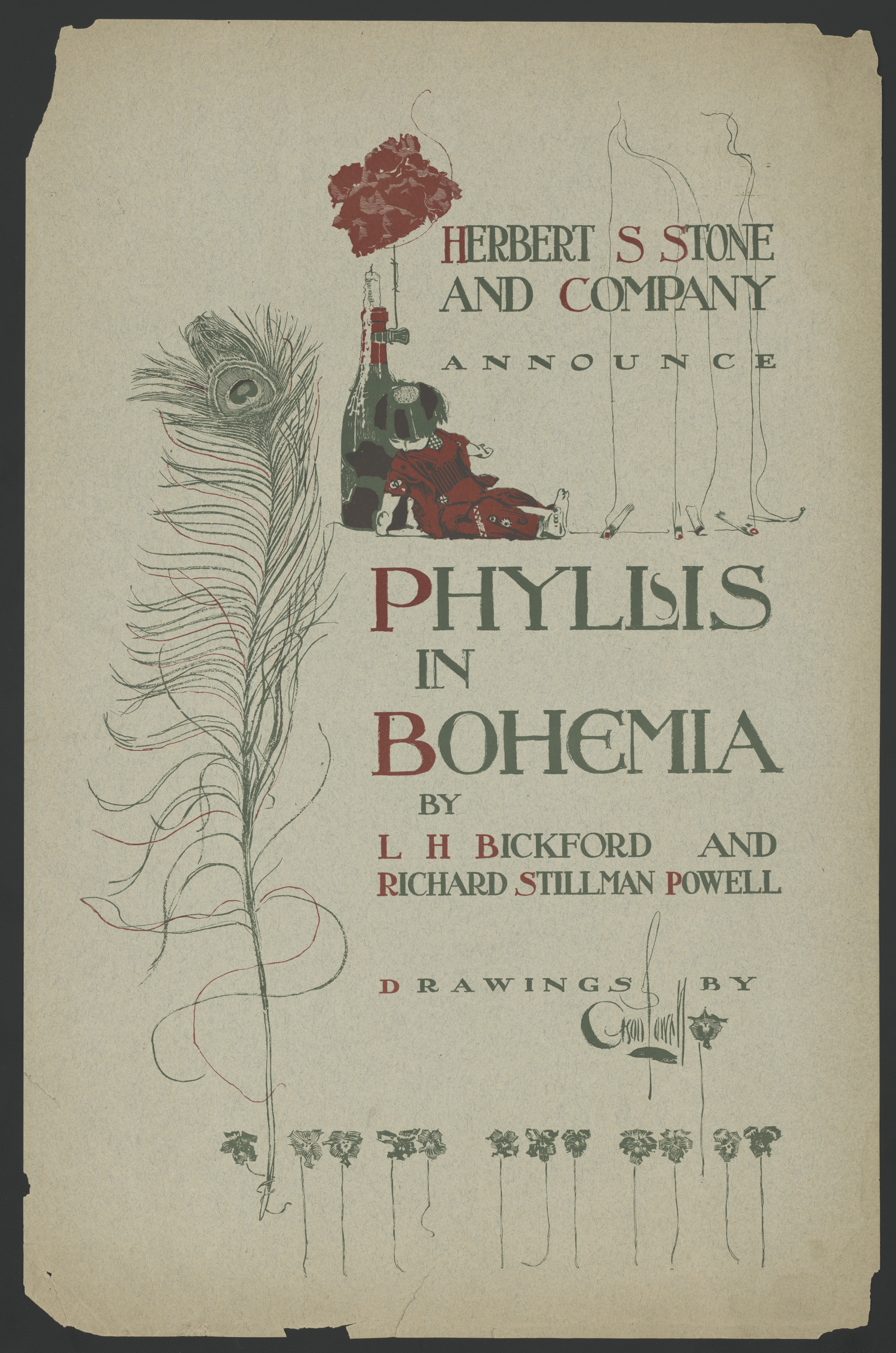
Poster for Phyllis in Bohemia (1897), cowritten with L. H. Bickford

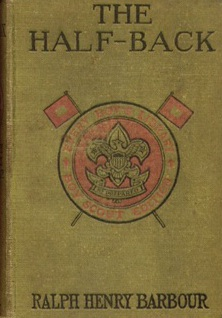
"The Half Back", Every Boy's Library Boy Scout Edition

=== As Richard Stillman Powell ===
- Phyllis in Bohemia, 1897

=== As Ralph Henry Barbour ===
- The Half-Back, 1899
- For the Honor of the School: A Story of School Life and Interscholastic Sport, 1900
- Captain of the Crew, 1901
- Behind the Line: A Story of College Life and Football, 1902
- Weatherby's Inning, 1903
- The Land of Joy, 1903
- The Arrival of Jimpson and Other Stories for Boys About Boys, 1904
- On Your Mark!, 1904
- Kitty of the Roses, 1904
- The Book of School and College Sports, 1904
- An Orchard Princess, 1905
- The Crimson Sweater, 1905
- A Maid in Arcady, 1906
- Four Afoot, 1906
- Holly: The Romance of a Southern Girl, 1907
- The Spirit of the School, 1907
- Tom, Dick and Harriet, 1907
- Harry's Island, 1908
- Forward Pass, 1908
- My Lady of the Fog, 1908
- The Half-Back: A Story of School, Football, and Golf, 1909
- Double Play; A Story of School and Baseball, 1909
- The Lilac Girl, 1909
- Captain Chub, 1910
- Winning His "Y": A Story of School Athletics, 1910
- The Golden Heart, 1910
- Kingsford Quarter, 1910
- The New Boy at Hilltop and Other Stories, 1910
- Finkler's Field: A Story of School and Baseball, 1911
- For Yardley: A Story of Track and Field, 1911
- Joyce of the Jasmines, 1911
- Team-Mates, 1911
- Four in Camp: A Story of Summer Adventures in the New Hampshire Woods, 1912
- Four Afloat Being the Adventures of the Big Four on the Water, 1912
- Weatherby's Inning, 1912
- The Harbor of Love, 1912
- Change Signals: A Story of the New Football, 1912
- Cupid En Route, 1912
- Crofton Chums, 1912
- Lady Laughter, 1913
- Around the End, 1913
- Partners Three, 1913
- The Story My Doggie Told to Me, 1914 Also Project Gutenberg
- Left End Edwards, 1914
- Benton's Venture, 1914
- The Brother of a Hero, 1914
- Heart's Content, 1915
- Danforth Plays the Game: Stories for Boys Little and Big, (1915)
- Left Tackle Thayer, 1915
- The Secret Play, 1915
- The Lucky Seventh, 1915 (?)
- Rivals for the Team: A Story of School Life and Football, (1916)
- The Purple Pennant, 1916
- Left Guard Gilbert, 1916
- Hitting the line, 1917
- Center Rush Rowland, 1917
- The Adventure Club Afloat, 1917
- Winning His Game, 1917
- Keeping His Course, 1917
- For the Freedom of the Seas, 1918
- The Junior Trophy, 1918
- The play that won, 1919
- Full-Back Foster,
- The mystery of the Sea-Lark, 1920
- Joan of the Island, 1920 (with H.P. Holt) at Wikisource
- Quarter-Back Bates, 1920
- Fourth Down, 1920
- The Cruise of the Endeavour, or, Fortunes of War, 1921
- Kick Formation, 1921
- Metipom's Hostage, 1921
- Left Half Harmon, 1921
- Over Two Seas, 1922
- Right End Emerson, 1922
- The Turner Twins, 1922
- For the good of the team, 1923
- Right Guard Grant, 1923
- Nid and Nod, 1923
- Right Tackle Todd, 1924
- The Fighting Scrub, 1924
- Spaniard's Cave, 1924
- Follow the Ball, 1924
- Right Half Hollins, 1925
- Barry Locke, Half Back, 1925
- Bases Full!, 1925
- The Last Play, 1926
- Pud Pringle, Pirate, 1926
- Tod Hale with the Crew, 1926
- Let's Go To Florida!, 1926
- The Long Pass, 1927
- Heading North, 1927
- Tod Hale at Camp, 1927
- Tod Hale at Yale, 1927
- Tod Hale on the Scrub, 1928
- Hunt Holds the Center, 1928
- Comrades of the Key, 1928 (?)
- The Fortunes of the Team, 1928
- Substitute Jimmy, 1928
- Giles of the Mayflower, 1929
- Hero of the Camp, 1932
- The Cub Battery, 1932
- Pirates of the Shoals, 1932
- Skate, Glendale!, 1932
- The Crew of the "Casco", 1933 (?)
- Peril in the Swamp 1934
- Five Points Service, 1935
- Good Manners for Boys, 1937 (?)
- How to Play Better Baseball, 1937 (with Lamar Sarra)
- Hurricane Sands, 1940
- How to Play Better Basketball, 1941 (with Lamar Sarra)
- Mystery on the Bayou, 1943 (?)

== Sources ==
- Author and Bookinfo.com
