= Mighty Joe Young (1949 film) =

Fantasy film by Ernest Schoedsack

- Theatrical release poster
- Directed by: Merian C. Cooper; Ernest B. Schoedsack
- Screenplay by: Ruth Rose
- Story by: Merian C. Cooper
- Produced by: Merian C. Cooper
- Starring: Terry Moore; Ben Johnson; Robert Armstrong; Frank McHugh; Douglas Fowley
- Cinematography: J. Roy Hunt
- Edited by: Ted Cheesman
- Music by: Roy Webb
- Production company: Argosy Pictures
- Distributed by: RKO Radio Pictures
- Release date: July 13, 1949
- Running time: 93 minutes
- Country: United States
- Language: English
- Budget: $1.8 million
- Box office: $1.95 million

Mighty Joe Young (also known as Mr. Joseph Young of Africa and The Great Joe Young) is a 1949 American black-and-white fantasy film distributed by RKO Radio Pictures and produced by the same creative team responsible for King Kong (1933). The film was produced and directed by Merian C. Cooper and Ernest B. Schoedsack, and written by Ruth Rose. It stars Robert Armstrong, Terry Moore, and Ben Johnson in his first credited screen role. Animation effects were handled by Willis O'Brien, Ray Harryhausen, Pete Peterson, and Marcel Delgado. It was released on July 13, 1949, and underperformed at the box office, though reviews were generally positive. In 1950, the film won an Academy Award for special effects.

Mighty Joe Young tells the story of a young woman, Jill Young, living on her father's ranch in Africa. Jill has raised the title character, a large gorilla, from an infant, and years later brings him to Hollywood. The film explores the themes of domesticity, humanization, and primitivism. It was later remade in 1998 with Charlize Theron and Bill Paxton. From 2017 to 2018, Aberystwyth University hosted an exhibition about its production.

== Plot ==
In 1937 Tanganyika territory, Africa, seven-year-old Jill Young is living with her father on his ranch. Two Africans come by with an orphaned baby mountain gorilla. Unbeknownst to her widowed father, Jill trades some of her toys, jewelry, and money for the gorilla and names him Joe Young. When he finds out, her father is initially reluctant to keep the gorilla, but eventually agrees.

Twelve years later, businessman Max O'Hara and a cowboy named Gregg are on a trip in Africa looking for animals to headline in Max's Hollywood nightclub. The men have captured several lions and are about to leave when Joe Young appears, now 12 feet (3.7 m) tall and weighing 4,500 pounds (2,000 kg). When a caged lion bites Joe's fingers, he goes on a rampage. Visualizing Joe as their big nightclub attraction, Max and Gregg try to rope him, but he throws both men from their horses, breaks free, and attempts to attack them. A grown Jill Young arrives, calming Joe. The men meet with Jill, and Gregg becomes smitten with her. Max asks her to bring Joe and be part of his nightclub entertainment. He tells her that Joe and she will be a Hollywood hit and rich within weeks. Dazzled by O'Hara's promises of fame and fortune, the naïve girl agrees to take Joe to Hollywood.

On opening night, Joe lifts a large platform above his head, holding Jill playing "Beautiful Dreamer" on a grand piano. Afterward, Joe has a tug of war with "the 10 strongest men in the world", which he easily wins. Italian heavyweight boxer Primo Carnera tries to box with him, but Joe tosses him into the audience. Joe's popularity grows, and by the 10th week, he is Hollywood's biggest nightclub attraction. By the 17th week, Joe has grown tired of performing and is homesick. Later, during dinner, Gregg and Jill express their love for one another, with Gregg agreeing to return with her to Africa. In his cage, an unhappy Joe tries to ignore three drunks who have sneaked backstage; they offer Joe an open whiskey bottle, and he becomes intoxicated. Taunting him, the drunks burn Joe's fingers with a cigarette lighter. Roaring with pain and rage, he breaks out, wrecking the nightclub's interior. He also smashes the glass of the lion habitat, allowing the lions to escape into the crowded club.

After the drunks accuse Joe of trying to kill them, a court decree orders Joe to be shot. Gregg, Max, Jill, and a friend named Windy devise a plan to get Joe back to Africa using a moving van and cargo ship. Before reaching port, they see an orphanage engulfed in flames. Jill and Gregg help the caretakers save the children. A last group, along with Jill and Gregg, is trapped on the top level. Joe braves the raging fire by climbing an adjacent tall tree, carrying Jill to safety, while Gregg lowers each child by rope to the ground. One child is left behind, so Joe climbs up again, grabbing the little girl. Max assures Jill that because of Joe's heroism, his life will now be spared.

Much later, Max receives home movies from his friends. Jill and Gregg are married and living on their ranch in Africa with Joe. Joe waves "goodbye", along with Jill and Gregg, to Max.

== Cast ==
- Terry Moore as Jill Young
- Lora Lee Michel as Young Jill
- Ben Johnson as Gregg Johnson
- Robert Armstrong as Max O'Hara
- Frank McHugh as Windy
- Douglas Fowley as Jones
- Denis Green as Dan Crawford
- Regis Toomey as John Young
- Paul Guilfoyle as Smith
- Nestor Paiva as Brown
- James Flavin as Schultz
- Primo Carnera as himself

Uncredited performances with dialogue:

- Phil Olafsson as The Swedish Angel
- William Schallert as a gas station attendant
- Charles Lane as a producer
- Ellen Corby as a nurse at the burning orphanage
- Irene Ryan as a southern belle at the bar

== Production ==
=== Conception ===
Mighty Joe Young was produced by Arko, a company formed by John Ford and Merian C. Cooper and owned by RKO and Argosy Pictures. Arko was formed solely for making Mighty Joe Young. John Ford was credited as a co-producer of the film, but left before shooting began. Though Cooper originally conceived of the story, he may have taken inspiration from Toto and I by Augusta Maria Hoyt. He wanted to make a film where a gorilla is raised by a woman, feels affection for her, and faces negative consequences as a result of his affection. This idea eventually evolved into the plot of Mighty Joe Young. It was approved for creation in 1946 by RKO, which was to distribute it.

As production progressed with a budget between $1.2 and $1.5 million, Ernest Schoedsack and Willis O'Brien contributed to the storyline, while Schoedsack's wife, Ruth Rose, wrote the screenplay. She based the characters Gregg and O'Hara on her husband and Cooper, respectively. In planning the film, Cooper aimed for a lighthearted reflection of King Kong. As such, it is considered the third segment in the King Kong trilogy, being preceded by King Kong and Son of Kong. Working titles included The Last Safari, African Cowboy, Mr. Joseph Young of Africa, and The Great Joe Young. Posters bearing the last title were released, but the name was changed on the day the film debuted. The producers considered cancelling the film several times, but after three years, it was completed.

=== Animation models ===
While Mighty Joe Young was in its conception stages in 1945, production designer Willis O'Brien, with Cooper's approval, hired a young man named Ray Harryhausen with whom he had been acquainted for several years. Harryhausen was fascinated by the stop-motion animation in King Kong and had experimented with stop-animation films of his own, showing them to O'Brien, to whom he looked up as a mentor. Mighty Joe Young was Harryhausen's first major film project. Until the film was officially approved in 1946, O'Brien and Harryhausen worked from O'Brien's home. At first, Harryhausen's duties mainly consisted of cutting frames, mounting storyboards, copy typing, and attending story meetings. In these meetings O'Brien presented ideas for the plot.

With the film's approval, O'Brien and Harryhausen moved to an RKO studio in Culver City, where they were able to officially begin production. O'Brien was given a special effects team of 47 people. O'Brien felt that he did not need a team that large, but Hollywood union rules stated that different jobs needed to be done by different people. As a result, the film cost more to make than it would have with a smaller team. Members of the team included O'Brien, Harryhausen, Pete Peterson, George Lofgren, Marcel Delgado, Fitch Fulton, Harold Stine, Bert Willis, and Linwood Dunn. Fewer than ten animators were on the team. Later, Harryhausen explained that few of the animators produced footage that was fit to be used in the final film. Animation took 14 months, from October 1947 to December 1948. Cooper went to the animation set every day.

Joe was animated using posable figures modeled after real gorillas. Each model, made of an aluminum-copper skeleton with 150 pieces, cost nearly $1500. Harryhausen designed the armature with ball-and-socket joints; early models were designed with hinge joints. Using ball-and-socket joints allowed for increased natural joint movement though they required frequent repairs. Engineer Harry Cunningham was put in charge of assembling the armature. Years later, Cunningham denied assembling it, and animator Jim Danforth guessed that Cunningham delegated the task to someone else. Once the armatures were complete, Delgado formed the gorilla's muscles. To do this, he attached foam rubber, cotton, and dental dam to the armatures and covered them with latex rubber to begin molding. Forming the muscles directly onto the armature made it look like the muscles were moving as the model moved, necessitating careful attention to detail while creating the model.

The next step was to add the fur. The fur used on the models was taken from the hide of an unborn calf; the fine hair worked well for a small-scale model of a large animal. O'Brien decided that it needed to be rubberized to prevent the hairs from sticking up when the animators handled the models, a problem that had not been addressed for the King Kong model. Familiar with his patented technique for rubberizing fur, O'Brien hired George Lofgren to prepare the fur. Lofgren stretched the hide, combed the fur, and covered the hairs with a washable adhesive. After the adhesive dried, he placed the hide skin-up in a sealed container with Dermestes larvae, which ate the skin but not the hair and exposed the hair follicles. This done, rubber latex was applied; the adhesive was washed away after the rubber cured. In all, the six models varied from 5 to 16 inches tall. The smaller models were used for long shots of Joe. Harryhausen also created a 15-inch model of Joe's torso for close-ups, but it was never used because the other models sufficed. After filming was completed for the day, Delgado repaired the models. Having multiple models made continued animation possible, while other models were being repaired. Delgado designed and sculpted additional models for lions, horses, and people to be used in stunt scenes.

=== Animation process ===
O'Brien's work on the animation largely involved the planning and preparation, including setting up the background images, while his assistants did most of the stop-motion features. Backgrounds for the animated scenes were created by using both glass paintings and projected images. To make a background of glass paintings, O'Brien layered sheets of painted glass, bringing depth to the image. Further depth was achieved with multiple small-scale props in the foreground. The other background method, projection, required small models so that the projected image could be smaller and therefore more crisp. O'Brien and Cunningham designed and made the ARKO projectors used for the process. Initially, Cooper wanted the film to be shot in Technicolor, but getting the colors to appear correctly on the glass paintings proved to take too much time and risked exceeding the budget. Instead, it was filmed in black and white. Later, they tinted the burning orphanage scene in red, orange, and yellow.

Harryhausen, who did more than 80% of the animation, felt that King Kong's movements were unnatural and decided that Joe's movements should be smoother. To accomplish this, he took pictures and observed footage of gorillas in the Chicago Zoo. Harryhausen did not attempt to imitate the gorillas' movements; instead, he explained that he wanted to determine "how they walked and their little idiosyncrasies". For a time, Harryhausen ate mostly carrots and celery, thinking it would help him feel like a gorilla so he could animate effectively. He preferred animating by himself because it increased his concentration. Eventually, he was nicknamed "one-take Harryhausen" because he had to reshoot few sequences. Some individual scenes took a few days to animate. Among the most difficult was the scene in which Joe sits disconsolately in his cage. The model's movements needed to be slight and facial expressions detailed. Facial expressions were made possible by moving wires inside the head. Scott Wittaker took several months to animate a nightclub scene in which patrons throw coins at Joe. The models and animation are more sophisticated than in King Kong and use more subtle gestures. Despite the increased technical sophistication, the film, like King Kong, features scale issues, with Joe noticeably changing size between many shots. Harryhausen attributed these lapses to Cooper, who insisted Joe appear larger in some scenes for dramatic effect.

As the deadline approached, more animators were hired, including Pete Peterson and Buzz and Carl Gibson. Originally a grip, Pete Peterson had shown interest in the animation process, watching while Harryhausen would animate. On his own, he began to study people's movements by placing tape on their limbs and taking pictures. After some time, Peterson requested to help with animation. Hard-pressed for animators since Cooper pushed for animation to be sped up, O'Brien hired him. Because he had multiple sclerosis and found it difficult to stand, Peterson was able to sit while animating. Peterson quickly learned animation processes, and according to Harryhausen did a better job than some of the previous assistants. His emphasis was on humorous shots with Joe in the nightclub and escape scenes. Cooper hired Buzz and Carl Gibson to further expedite animation. They were put in charge of animating the sequence in which Joe first comes to the safari camp where Gregg and O'Hara are staying. Used to working with the larger models of King Kong, they found working with the smaller models used in Mighty Joe Young to be difficult and left after six weeks. The scenes they animated are not in the completed film. After they left, Harryhausen animated the sequence.

=== Live-action sequences ===
Schoedsack was nearly blind while directing the live-action footage. Assistant director Sam Ruman told Schoedsack what was happening on set so he could direct more effectively. To better know how to implement stop-motion effects, O'Brien watched the live-action scenes. In the safari sequence when Joe knocks over horses, the cowboys had their horses drop; Joe's movements were based on the structure of the fall. In the same scene, when the cowboys try lassoing Joe, the actors tried lassoing a tractor. In the completed scene, the tractor was blocked by the model of Joe. While the adult version of Joe is animated, baby Joe is depicted by a live baby gorilla. No locations in Africa were used in shooting the film; instead, it was shot in New York City, Niagara Falls, Florida, Scotland, Spain, Austria, and Italy. Upon its completion in 1949, Cooper wished he had added more humorous elements. However, Harryhausen disliked Cooper's emphasis on comedy, feeling that it ruined the tone of the film. Moore acted without makeup because her makeup artist was an alcoholic and often had hangovers. Ben Johnson, meanwhile, made his screen debut by playing Gregg.

== Themes ==
=== Domestication and humanity ===
The film has a more domestic tone than its predecessors in the "giant ape" trilogy of King Kong and Son of Kong. Cynthia Erb, who is a Wayne State University associate professor of English and film, suggests that the domesticity may have been influenced by Cooper's business partnership with John Ford, who typically addressed domestic themes in his films. Erb also attributed the increased domesticity to the timing of the film, coming out after World War II. College of Charleston English professor Valerie Frazier attributes this to America's war-weariness. One way the tone was more domestic was by making Joe into a "childlike" character, which Cooper thought would help make the film attractive to children. Joe becomes a sentimental character when he saves the children from the burning orphanage. Psychologist Joseph D. Miller suggests that from a young age, Joe's masculinity is removed by Jill's influence, as well as by their brother-sister relationship. This, he says, removes any idea that the two have a romantic relationship, as King Kong has with Ann Darrow. According to Miller, Joe's sexuality is suppressed by music, as well as the nature of his relationship with Jill. Joe breaks from that suppression during his drunken rampage, but it is short-lived. Miller explains that Joe's sexuality may have been suppressed because film censoring became common.

Cooper told film critic Thomas M. Pryor that Mighty Joe Young is about "the effects of civilization on animals transported from native habitats to such an incongruous jungle as a Hollywood nightclub." English professor Joseph D. Andriano suggests that throughout the film Joe is humanized and some people are bestialized. Andriano and author Jason Barr explain that this is an attempt to create a relatability between humans and other primates. For example, patrons of the nightclub are bestialized in their drunkenness. They seek to objectify Joe, seeing him as their entertainment. Realizing he has objectified Joe by putting him in a nightclub, O'Hara seeks to rectify his actions by concocting a plan to help Joe escape being shot. Barr explains that the "deeply humanized" Joe manifests his humanity through his initial enjoyment of performing, which he views as play. When he becomes depressed after several weeks of performing, however, he displays human-like characteristics. According to Barr his humanity is increased by his rampage because it is a reaction to poor treatment and he is calmed down easily.

=== Racial commentary ===
Frazier sees Joe Young as a successor to the character of King Kong, who with his power and sexual interest in a white woman, represents "the threat of the black other." In contrast to King Kong, Mighty Joe Young "consciously sh[ies] away from potentially polarizing social or political messages." While definite postcolonial implications arose by shipping Joe from Africa to entertain people at a nightclub and then being returned there, the happy ending does little to address these implications. Unlike King Kong, who is entranced by Ann's beauty, Joe Young does not have sexual tension with Jill. For Frazier, both of these changes from the King Kong narrative make Mighty Joe Young less popular than its predecessor. According to Erb, the film portrays Africa as an exotic location, "preserv[ing] to some extent the exploitative impulses inherent in this vision". She explains that it simultaneously employs and exposes stereotypes of Africa. This is often seen through the character O'Hara, who lives in a modern setting, but holds on to primitivist Victorian ideas about Africa. O'Hara tells dramatic stories of his time in Africa, all of which are untrue. His office with decorated with several artifacts, and his nightclub features a "primitivist dancer number". Erb says that the film "offers a moderate parody" of O'Hara's primitivist views. Eventually, O'Hara sees beyond primitivism. Barr explains that Joe's removal from Africa serves "to heighten [his] absurdity and [his] bizarre-ness". At the same time, Joe's rampage through the club signifies his destruction of primitivism, contrasting with his eventual domestication. Erb calls the film "a productive exposure of...primitivist fantasies found in...jungle films".

== Release ==
Trailer

Mighty Joe Young's marketing campaign was run by Terry Turner. The film was advertised on television and radio commercials, including NBC, and at the P.T. Barnum Festival Fun Day Parade in Connecticut. The studio created four different poster designs and multiple lobby cards. Additionally, they sent 11,000 postcards to people, each of which had a message from Joe Young. In New Jersey, a city manager hired a man to dress in a gorilla suit and surf on the beach while holding up promotional signs; a week before the film officially showed in theaters, he also hired a man in a gorilla suit to climb a local movie theater. In New York, a televised parade featured a Joe Young mascot riding on a street float; the float stopped in front of the movie theater, where the mayor greeted the Joe Young mascot. On opening night in one city, a man dressed as a gorilla performed stunts on buildings and tightropes, while "gorilla trucks" drove around New England and New York. Flannery O'Connor, who was living in New York City when the film was released, borrowed aspects of its campaign for her novel Wise Blood. Specifically, she based Gonga the Gorilla off of the campaign's use of men in gorilla suits. Also in the novel, the character Enoch Emery watches a film in which an orangutan rescues children from a burning orphanage, reminiscent of Mighty Joe Young.

Mighty Joe Young premiered on July 13, 1949, in 358 theaters across New England and upstate New York. Its midsummer release was an uncommon practice at the time because producers often thought that people would rather be outside than watch movies. The film opened in fifth place at the US box office. Ticket sales added up to about $1,950,000, but because of production costs, the film made no profit and the company lost $675,000. Once production companies saw its deficiency in the box office, O'Brien struggled to find work in major motion pictures.

== Reception ==
Film critic Thomas M. Pryor in his review for The New York Times said that Merian Cooper and Ernest Schoedsack, as producer and director "... are endeavoring to make all the world love, or at the very least feel a deep sympathy for, their monstrous, mechanical gorilla." A review in Variety had a similar opinion: "Young is fun to laugh at and with, loaded with incredible corn, plenty of humor, and a robot gorilla who becomes a genuine hero. The technical skill of the large staff of experts gives the robot life, both for audience thrills and sympathy." Writing for The Daily Express, Leonard Mosley stated that, though Joe is portrayed by an animation model, he "had much more sympathy than any flesh and blood actor in the film." Motion Picture Herald called Joe "the ingenious creation of Mr. Willis O'Brien." The Daily Mail felt similarly, writing that "the star of this film is a Mr. Willis O'Brien." Screenwriter Paul Dehn wrote that "'Mr. Young' is as real as 'Slavering Sam." Mighty Joe Young was generally not well-liked among viewers who perceived it as a revisitation of King Kong. The Times of London dubbed Joe "the King Kong of 1949". Today's Cinema predicted that the film would "clean-up at popular box-offices". A review in The Hollywood Reporter expressed that the film "leaves much to be desired. It is little more than footage strung together by a plot that rarely makes sense."

=== Current ===
Neil Pettigrew of Cinefantastique in particular praises the scenes where Joe sits disconsolately in his cage, commenting that they are "fluidly animated" and give Joe "a distinct and credible personality". Pettigrew rated them as the fifth of "20 finest stop-motion special effects sequences". Jeff Rovin states that the skill by which Joe was animated contrasts with the skills of the actors and actresses, who, in his view, do not seem to take the film seriously. Kim Newman in Empire says that Joe is "a smoother character than Kong, but he's a pretender rather than a king." Newman adds that "no one in the movie even mentions that there might be something unusual about a sixteen-foot-tall ape".

== Academy Award ==
In 1950 Mighty Joe Young won the Academy Award for Best Visual Effects. The other nominee that year was the film Tulsa, which was nominated for its animation of an oil field. O'Brien initially nominated multiple people he believed should receive the award, including Harryhausen, but Academy Awards had created a policy where only one person could receive the award. O'Brien was sent to accept the award, saying, "Thank you, very, very much." Following the award ceremony Cooper allowed O'Brien to keep the award, even though it was to have gone to him because he was the producer.

== Exhibition ==
Aberystwyth University discovered an album in the archive that contained original artwork, more than a hundred stills, and production photographs. The album, likely created by crew members, was gifted to the university by film historian Raymond Durgnat. The album was displayed at a free exhibition at the Aberystwyth School of Art which ran from November 20, 2017, to February 2, 2018, under the direction of professor Harry Heuser. The exhibition, entitled Recapturing Mighty Joe Young: The Movie! The Memory!! The Make-believe!!!, incorporated slideshows, artifacts, posters, storyboards, paintings, copies of the album pages, and concept art from other 1940s films. Also featured in the exhibition was a board that was signed in January 1948 by forty-five members of the cast and crew. Curator and art historian Harry Heuser points out, "not all of the names listed here appear in the credits on screen. Some have never been associated with the film." The board, illustrated by Scott Whitaker, is a "unique record of a production underway," says Heuser. Animation workshops were also offered; films created during the workshops were featured in the exhibition. The exhibition opened with a presentation from The Ray and Diana Harryhausen Foundation's collections manager Connor Heaney. He presented a history of the film's production and surviving models and artworks held in the foundation's archive before introducing a screening of the movie.

== Sequel and remake ==
Following the release of Mighty Joe Young, Cooper and Sol Lesser contemplated creating a sequel entitled Mighty Joe Young Meets Tarzan. Leland Laurence was to write the screenplay, and the plot was to take place solely in Africa. The film was never completed.

Mighty Joe Young was remade through a collaboration between RKO and Disney and was released in 1998. It was written by Lawrence Konner and Mark Rosenthal and produced by Tom Jacobsen and Ted Hartley. Charlize Theron played Jill and Bill Paxton played Gregg O'Hara. Joe was created with a combination of animatronics, CGI, and a gorilla costume worn by creature performer John Alexander. Joe was designed by Rick Baker and CGI was created by DreamQuest Images. Harryhausen expressed satisfaction with the adaptation.

== See also ==
- King Kong
- List of American films of 1949
- List of fictional primates
- List of stop motion films

== Bibliography ==
- Andriano, Joseph D. (1999). Immortal Monster: The Mythological Evolution of the Fantastic Beast in Modern Fiction and Film. Contributions to the Study of Science Fiction and Fantasy, Number 78. Westport, Connecticut: Greenwood Press. ISBN 0-313-30667-2.
- Archer, Steve (1993). Willis O'Brien: Special Effects Genius. Jefferson, North Carolina: McFarland Classics. ISBN 0-7864-0573-2.
- Barr, Jason (2023). The Kaiju Connection: Giant Monsters and Ourselves. Jefferson, North Carolina: McFarland & Company. ISBN 9781476693514.
- Brierton, Tom (2004). Stop-Motion Puppet Sculpting: A Manual of foam Injection, Build-Up, and Finishing Techniques. Jefferson, North Carolina: McFarland & Company. ISBN 0-7864-1873-7.
- Brogdon, William (May 25, 1949). "Film Reviews: Mighty Joe Young". Variety. p. 8 – via Internet Archive.
- Byrge, Duane (May 7, 2013). "Visual Effects Pioneer Ray Harryhausen Dies at 92". The Hollywood Reporter.
- Cady, Brian (May 21, 2003). "Mighty Joe Young (1949)". Turner Classic Movies. Archived from the original on July 6, 2011.
- Cofer, Jordan (Winter 2010). "Flannery O'Connor's Role in Popular Culture: A Review Essay". Southern Quarterly. 47 (2): 140–157. ProQuest 222238409.
- Cotta Vaz, Mark (2005). Living Dangerously: The Adventures of Merian C. Cooper, Creator of King Kong. New York: Villard Books. ISBN 1-4000-6276-4.
- Eby, Douglas (December 1, 1998). "Mighty Joe Young: Terry Moore". Cinefantastique. 30 (11): 20.
- Erb, Cynthia (2009). Tracking King Kong A Hollywood Icon in World Culture (2nd ed.). Detroit: Wayne State University Press. ISBN 978-0-8143-3430-0.
- "Film Cos. Veering More to Multiple, Regional Openings, Day-and-Date". Variety. July 13, 1949. p. 7 – via Internet Archive.
- Fiscus, James W. (2005). Meet King Kong. Famous Movie Monsters. Rosen Publishing Group. ISBN 978-1404202702.
- Frazier, Valerie (December 2007). "King Kong's Reign Continues: 'King Kong' as a Sign of Shifting Racial Politics". CLA Journal. 51 (2): 186–205. JSTOR 44335418.
- Gleiberman, Owen (December 23, 1998). "Mighty Joe Young". EW.com.
- Hankin, Mike (2008). Ray Harryhausen – Master of the Majicks, Vol. 2: The American Films. Los Angeles: Archive Editions, LLC. ISBN 978-0-9817829-0-4.
- Harryhausen, Ray (1974). Film Fantasy Scrapbook. South Brunswick: A.S. Barnes. ISBN 9780498016325. OCLC 1008040.
- Harryhausen, Ray (June 17, 2006). "Weekend: Pictures with Meaning: Ray Harryhausen, award-winning animator: Scene For Mighty Joe Young, by Willis O'Brien (1949)". The Guardian. Guardian News & Media.
- Harryhausen, Ray; Dalton, Tony (2008). A Century of Model Animation: From Méliès to Aardman. London: Aurum Press. ISBN 978-1-84513-367-2.
- Harryhausen, Ray (2009). Art of Ray Harryhausen. New York: Watson-Guptill. ISBN 9780823084647. OCLC 276908198.
- Harryhausen, Ray; Dalton, Tony (2009). Ray Harryhausen: An Animated Life (2nd ed.). London: Aurum Press. ISBN 978-1-84513-501-0.
- Heuser, Harry (July 25, 2020). "Recapturing Mighty Joe Young: Cast and Crew Signatures". Harry Heuser.
- Heuser, Harry (July 25, 2020). "Recapturing Mighty Joe Young: Introduction". Harry Heuser.
- Jewell, Richard B.; Harbin, Vernon (1982). The RKO Story. London, England: Octopus Books Limited. ISBN 0-517-546566.
- "King Kong's Successor". Life. Vol. 27, no. 4. July 25, 1949. pp. 94–95.
- "Mighty Joe Young (1949): Notes". Turner Classic Movies. Archived from the original on July 6, 2011.
- Mallory, Michael (December 17, 2001). "Oscar's toon record a spotty picture". Variety.
- Massie, Claudia (October 24, 2020). "Fantastic beasts and where to find them: Claudia Massie explores the cinematic majesty and mind-bending visual trickery of stop-motion wizard Ray Harryhausen". Spectator. 344 (10026): 44–45.
- McKenna, A. T. (Fall 2020). "'Anybody with a buck': Terry Turner and the Ecosystems of Film Promotion, 1920–1960". Journal of Cinema and Media Studies. 60 (1): 49–69. JSTOR 27063733.
- Miller, Joseph D. (2005). "Darwin, Freud and King Kong". In Brin, David; Wilson, Leah (eds.). King Kong Is Back!: An Unauthorized Look at One Humongous Ape. Benbella Books. pp. 93–101.
- "National Boxoffice Survey". Variety. July 20, 1949. p. 3 – via Internet Archive.
- Nelson, Cassandra (March 2014). "Manichaeism and the Movies: Flannery O'Connor and the Roman Catholic Response to Film and Television at Midcentury". Literary Imagination. 16 (1): 76–94 – via Oxford Academic.
- Newman, Kim (January 3, 2007). "Mighty Joe Young". Empire.
- Pettigrew, Neil (1999). "20 Stop-Motion FX Highlights". Cinefantastique. 31 (1): 29–31.
- Pryor, Thomas M. (July 28, 1949). "'Mighty Joe Young', Featuring Giant Gorilla, Stars Terry Moore and Ben Johnson". The New York Times. p. 19.
- "Rare 1940s Hollywood artefacts on display at Aberystwyth School of Art – Aberystwyth University". www.aber.ac.uk. November 8, 2017.
- "Rare Hollywood Artefacts on Display for First Time". Cambrian News. December 7, 2017.
- "'Recapturing Mighty Joe Young' at Aberystwyth University | The Ray and Diana Harryhausen Foundation".
- Rovin, Jeff (1977). From the Land Beyond Beyond: The Films of Willis O'Brien and Ray Harryhausen. New York, New York: Berkley Publishing Corporation. ISBN 978-0425035061.
- Stein, Elliott (1977). "The Thirteen Voyages of Ray Harryhausen". Film Comment. 13 (6): 24–28, 64.
- "Top Grossers of 1949". Variety. January 4, 1950. p. 59.
- Variety Staff (April 9, 1997). "Theron gets close to 'Joe'". Variety.
- Walker-Werth, Thomas (Winter 2021). "Ray Harryhausen: Giving New Life to Old Legends". The Objective Standard. 16 (4): 49–55.
- "Willis O'Brien Wins Special Effects: 1950 Oscars". YouTube.
