= Howard Lincoln =

American lawyer, businessman, and baseball executive

- Lincoln in 2007
- Born: February 14, 1940 (age 86); Oakland, California, U.S.
- Education: University of California, Berkeley
- Known for: Former chairman of Nintendo of America, former CEO of Seattle Mariners
- Military career
- Allegiance: United States
- Branch: United States Navy
- Service years: 1966–1970
- Rank: Lieutenant

Howard Charles Lincoln (born February 14, 1940) is an American lawyer and businessman, known primarily for being the former chairman of Nintendo of America and the former chairman and chief executive officer (CEO) of the Seattle Mariners baseball team, representing absentee majority owner Hiroshi Yamauchi until Yamauchi died on September 19, 2013.

== Early life ==
Born in Oakland, California, Lincoln was an active Boy Scout. As a thirteen-year-old boy, he posed for the famous Norman Rockwell painting The Scoutmaster, which was published in a calendar in 1956. In the painting, young Lincoln is on the immediate right of the campfire. Lincoln eventually attained the rank of Eagle Scout and received a Distinguished Eagle Scout Award.

Lincoln matriculated in 1957 at the University of California, Berkeley, where he earned his BA in political science in 1962 and his Juris Doctor degree from University of California, Berkeley School of Law in 1965. From 1966 to 1970, he served as a lieutenant within the United States Navy Judge Advocate General's Corps. He then worked in private practice as an attorney in Seattle, Washington.

== Nintendo ==
Lincoln did legal work in 1981 for Nintendo, culminating in the legal case Universal City Studios, Inc. v. Nintendo Co., Ltd., in which Universal City Studios had sued Nintendo claiming that the video game Donkey Kong infringed upon Universal City Studio's rights to King Kong. Lincoln hired John Kirby to represent Nintendo in the courtroom. Nintendo won the case, as well as successive court appeals.

Lincoln met Yamauchi in 1982 and joined Nintendo in 1983, as its Senior Vice President and General Counsel. He and Minoru Arakawa were instrumental in rebuilding the North American video game industry (after the crash of 1983) with their highly successful marketing of the Nintendo Entertainment System. In 1994, he was appointed its chairman.

As Vice President of Nintendo, Lincoln was involved in litigation with Tengen, a subsidiary of Atari Games, about the rights to Tetris, and defended Nintendo's use of the 10NES lock-out chip. He represented the company in the 1993 United States Senate hearings on video games, during which he promised Joe Lieberman and Herb Kohl he would not release Night Trap on a Nintendo console because it was considered inappropriate for children.

Lincoln announced his retirement from Nintendo in 1999 and departed the company in 2000.

== Seattle Mariners ==
In September 1999, Lincoln became CEO of the Seattle Mariners, serving as the point man for majority investor Hiroshi Yamauchi when it came to making decisions (up until 2008, Lincoln noted that Yamauchi only pushed heavily for the team to pursue three players: Kazuhiro Sasaki, Ichiro Suzuki and Kenji Johjima); it was Lincoln that hired Pat Gillick to serve as general manager for the 2000 season.

Lincoln's tenure as CEO of the Seattle Mariners saw both success and controversy. Lincoln was considered instrumental, along with former senator Slade Gorton, in preserving the team's location in Seattle and negotiating with the city for a new stadium, Safeco Field. His stewardship has seen the team's first post-season appearances, in 1995, 1997, 2000, and 2001, as well as the aggressive expansion of the Mariners into the Japanese market, most noticeably through the acquisition of Japanese superstar Ichiro Suzuki.

Lou Piniella left after the 2002 season and Pat Gillick left the following year. Pinella once described Lincoln and Gillick prior to his departure: "I like Howard personally. I enjoyed working with him. He's a bright guy, a charming guy. But I'll tell you this -- he's bottom line. Howard likes total, total control. Pat wants to win. Howard just doesn't know how." Lincoln disagreed with that remark, stating that he gave the benefit of the doubt to those he had serve as general manager. Lincoln replaced Pinella with Bob Melvin and Gillick with Bill Bavasi, with the latter being considered by Lincoln as a regret. In 2002, the first season without playoff baseball for the Mariners in years, he was quoted as saying the following about the goal set out for the team when it came to acquisitions in or out of season: "You can go to the Series two ways; first, go for it regardless of the financial risk or consequences, the way Cleveland or Florida has; or go for it with a competitive team that plays for championships on a continual basis. The objective of the Seattle Mariners is not to go to the World Series regardless of the financial consequences, that is irresponsible." (this clarification arose after he had been quoted as saying the goal of the team was not to win a World Series but to be competitive every year). From 2003 to 2016, the Mariners went through nine different managers, with none of them reaching the playoffs under Lincoln (who was reported as having kept a notebook of the insults leveled at him up to 2004) as CEO.

In April 2016, Lincoln retired as CEO, concurrent with Nintendo selling most of its stake in the team.

== Philanthropy ==
In addition to Lincoln's business achievements, he is an active philanthropist. He has served as campaign chair for United Way of King County and the Chief Seattle Council of the Boy Scouts of America. He is also a trustee of Western Washington University.

== In popular culture ==
- Lincoln was portrayed by Ben Miles in the 2023 historical fiction film Tetris.
