= Arnold Greenberg (Coleco) =

American businessman

Arnold Greenberg (June 12, 1933 – March 19, 2025) was an American businessman best known as the CEO of Coleco in the 1970s and 1980s. He began his career in law but joined Coleco, a family toy business, in 1966. He worked aggressively to gain a large share of the video game market while maintaining Coleco's position as a manufacturer of other toys. Greenberg's drive to develop and market the Adam Computer in 1982 and 1983 eventually led the company into bankruptcy.

== Early life and career ==
Arnold Greenberg was born on June 12, 1933, in Hartford, Connecticut to Russian-Jewish immigrant parents. His father, Maurice Greenberg, started Coleco.

Arnold Greenberg entered law and practiced until 1966. He then joined Coleco, where he quickly came to dominate the company as its driving force and chief of marketing while his brother, Leonard Greenberg, provided engineering and manufacturing know-how. At this time, Coleco's main business was plastic above-ground swimming pools. Greenberg quickly acquired Eagle Toys, a maker of tabletop sports games, to diversify the company's offerings.

== Greenberg as CEO ==
Greenberg eventually became CEO of Coleco. In 1975, he decided to move Coleco into the video game business. The company developed the Telstar video game console, a home tennis game. This sold well, leading Coleco to the head of the market. Greenberg aggressively developed new games and hired talent from rival companies, keeping Coleco competitive through the 1970s.

Near the end of the decade, Greenberg decided to develop a home console that could play a variety of arcade-quality games. In 1981, Coleco began producing tabletop versions of arcade titles. The home ColecoVision console was released the following year. Greenberg also moved into third-party game development for systems from rivals Atari and Intellivision. His biggest coup was winning the license to Donkey Kong from Nintendo, although this eventually got him embroiled in a court case.

== Later career at Coleco ==
After the video game crash of 1983, Greenberg decided to move into home computing. He put all hope in the Adam Computer. Greenberg rushed the product through development to ship in 1983. As a result, many of the units were defective and had to be returned. Coleco shares fell 22 points. Greenberg swore to rectify the situation, but the damage had already been done.

Meanwhile, in 1983, Greenberg had obtained the license to produce Xavier Roberts's Little People dolls, which Coleco renamed Cabbage Patch Kids. The company produced 2.5 million dolls that year, not anticipating the huge rush for the toys that holiday season. The Cabbage Patch fad lasted until 1985 but was unable to rescue the ailing toymaker. Greenberg tried to salvage his company by purchasing the rights to Trivial Pursuit, but it was too late. Coleco filed for bankruptcy in 1988.

Those who worked with Greenberg have described him as nervous, driven, and short in both stature and temper. One associate described him as a "buttoned-down lawyer who was very creative, very forceful, and willing to take great chances." His associate Michael Katz described him as "incredibly bright and articulate, just a wonderful, spontaneous speaker. I think [he was] a very good leader ... dynamic and very tough and demanding."
