= Coleco Gemini =

Second generation home video game console

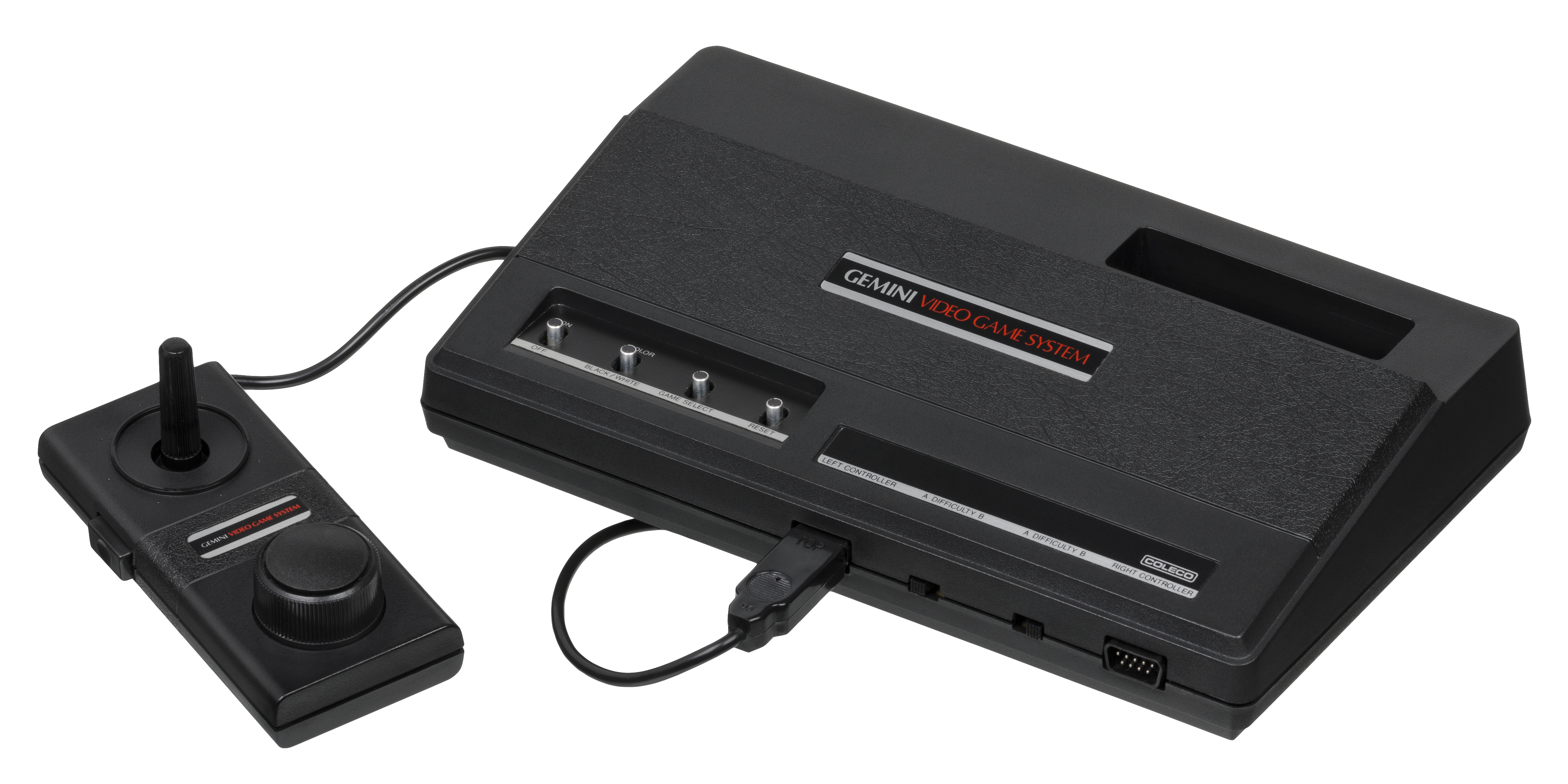
- The Coleco Gemini
- Manufacturer: Coleco Industries, Inc.
- Type: Home video game console
- Generation: Second generation
- Released: 1983
- Media: ROM cartridge
- CPU: MOS 6507 @ 1.19 MHz
- Memory: RAM: 128 bytes
- Display: 160x200, 128 Colors
- Controller input: Combination joystick/paddle controller
- Related: Atari 2600

The Coleco Gemini is an Atari 2600 clone manufactured by Coleco Industries, Inc. in 1983.. It is incompatible with Expansion Module #1, which allows for playing Atari 2600 games on a ColecoVision.

== Technical specifications ==
- Processor: 8-bit 6507
- CPU speed: 1.19 MHz
- RAM: 128 bytes
- Resolution: 160x200, 128 colors

== History ==
In 1982, Coleco released Expansion Module #1 for its ColecoVision video game system. With a custom-made clone of the Atari 2600 TIA chip and off-the-shelf components, the module enabled the ColecoVision to be compatible with Atari 2600 software. Later that year, Atari, Inc. sued Coleco for patent infringement, and the companies wound up settling out of court, with Coleco becoming a licensee of Atari's patents.

== Gemini vs. 2600 ==
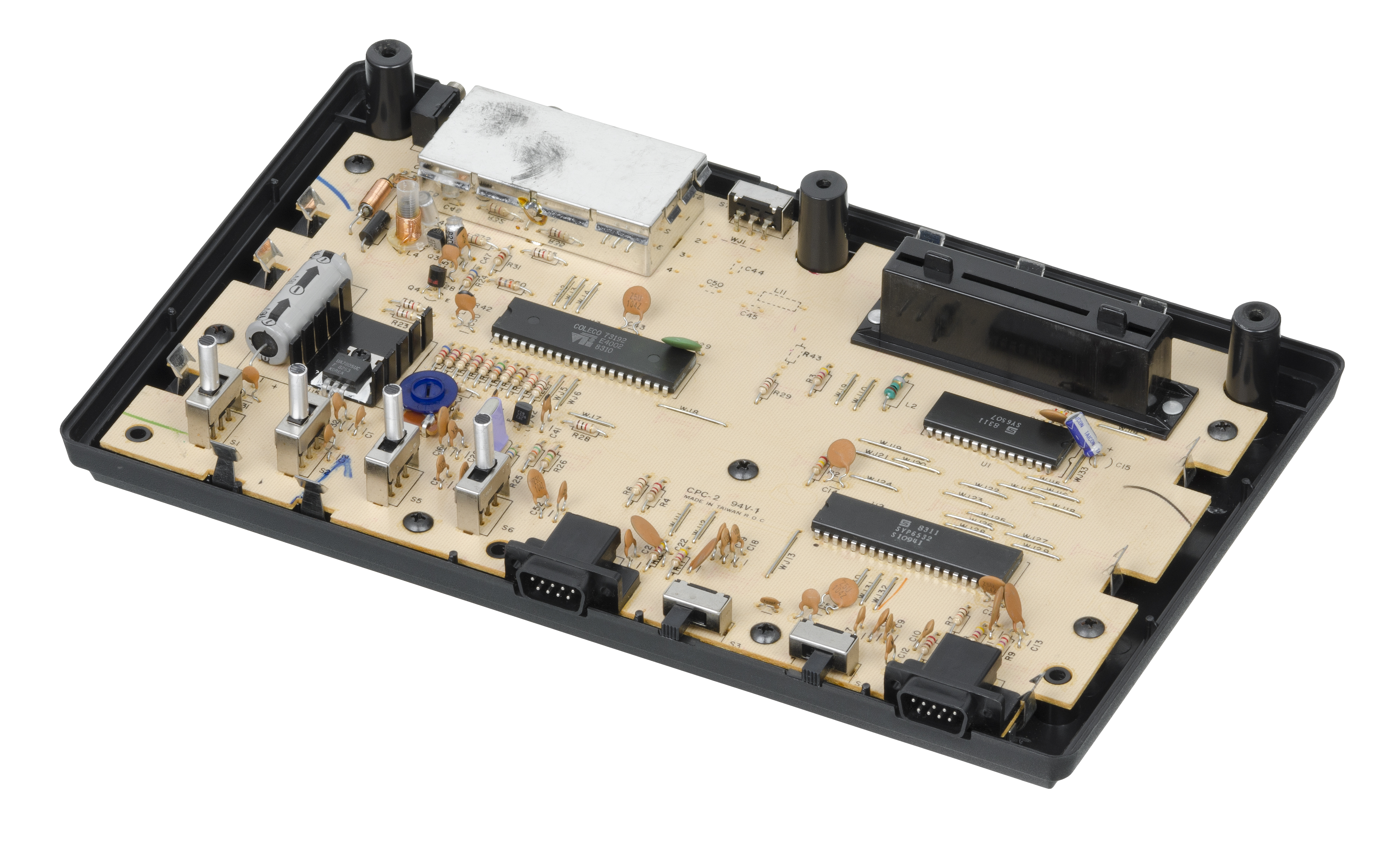
The internals of the Gemini

The main difference between the Coleco Gemini and the Atari 2600 is the controller design. The Coleco Gemini controllers (dubbed the 'Dual Command') featured an 8-way joystick and a 270-degree paddle on the same controller (the joystick was at the top of the controller, and the paddle was at the bottom of the controller). To play paddle games on the 2600, a Y-connector could be used to connect a joystick and paddles to the controller jack at the same time, rather than physically swapping controllers.

The Gemini was more compact than the large faux-woodgrain or gloss black-trimmed consoles sold by Atari at the time. The Gemini also had a different game included with the system. Atari was including its 1982 version of Pac-Man along with Combat (1977). The Gemini initially came bundled with Coleco's 1982 port of Donkey Kong, but at some point also included Carnival, Mouse Trap and Front Line. Sears also offered a version of the Gemini with both Donkey Kong and Mouse Trap included as separate cartridges.
