= Perfection (board game) =

Board game

Get rockin' before the pieces start poppin'!
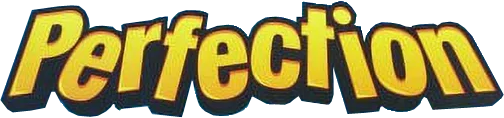
- Other names: Time Shock! Destreza; Rápido
- Designers: Gale Jenkins
- Publishers: Reed Toys; Coleco; Hasbro
- Publication: 1973; 53 years ago
- Years active: 1973–present
- Genres: Game
- Languages: English
- Players: 1–99
- Playing time: 6'
- Age range: 4+

Perfection is a game originally produced by the Pennsylvania company Reed Toys and then by the Milton Bradley company. The object is to put all the pieces into matching holes on the board (pushed down) before the time limit runs out. When time runs out, the board springs up, causing the pieces to fly out. In the most common version, there are 25 pieces to be placed into a 5×5 grid within 60 seconds.

== History ==
Thomas Kinnard Liversidge was the inventor of the board game perfection and owned harmonic Reed Company.

The original Perfection game was patented by the Harmonic Reed Company (later Reed Toys) in 1973. The patent was later transferred to Lakeside Industries, which was purchased by Coleco in 1986. Coleco declared bankruptcy in 1988, after which the remaining assets and IPs were purchased by Hasbro in 1989, who continues to manufacture the game under their Milton Bradley brand.

== Gameplay ==
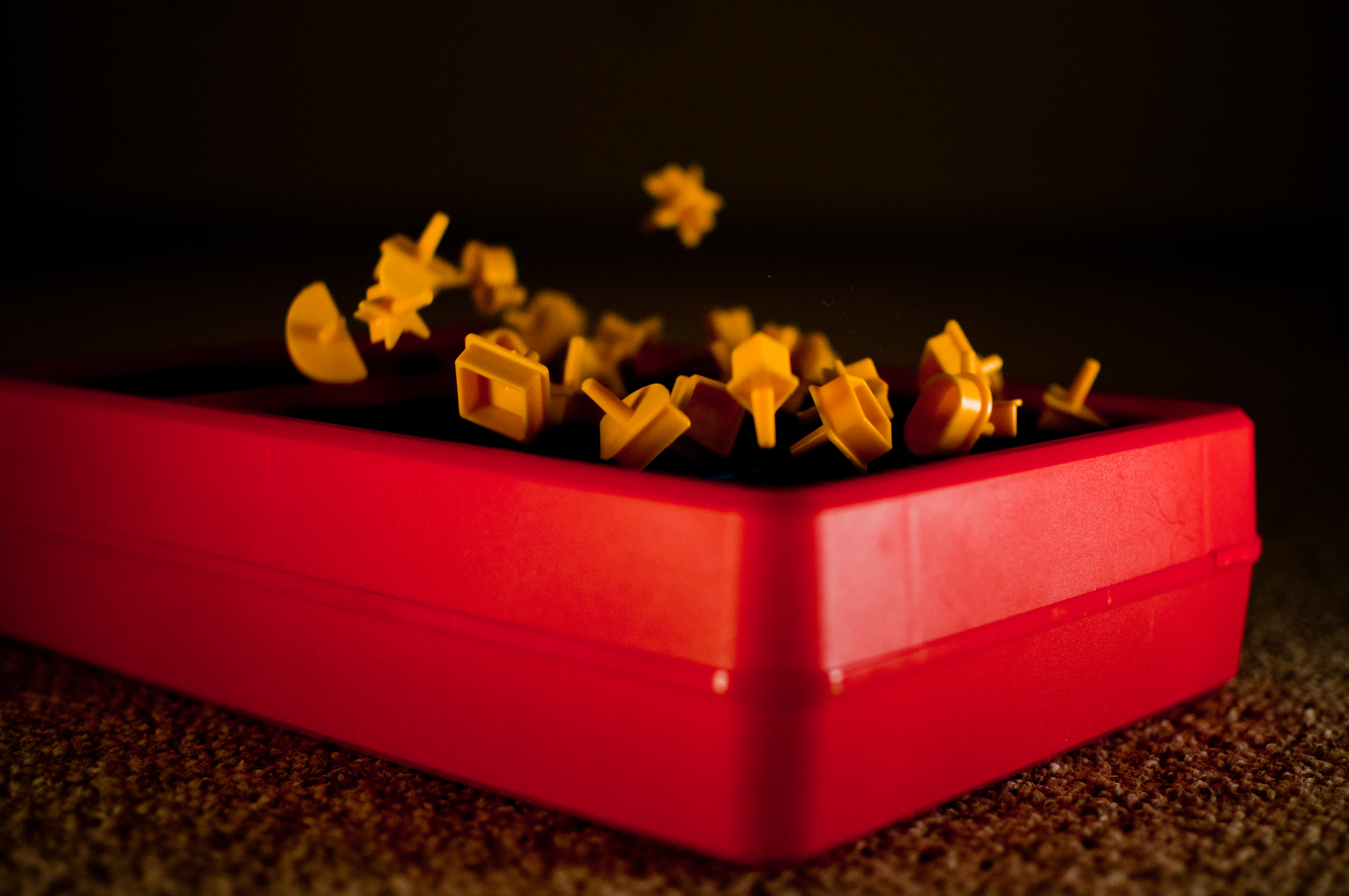
Game pieces burst up from a Perfection board

Each player takes a turn in which they attempt to fit all shapes into the corresponding holes in the game tray. The shapes are mixed and placed next to the game unit with handles facing up, the pop-up mechanism is pushed down, and the timer dial is set to 60 seconds. After moving the switch to START, the timer begins to run and the player must fit the shapes into their holes as quickly as possible. If the player completes this task, they move the switch to STOP and record the time taken. If time runs out, the tray pops up and scatters the pieces in all directions. The winner is the player who fills the tray in the shortest time.

=== Original 1973 version ===
1973 Perfection schematic

The original Perfection game published by Lakeside in 1973 consists of a red and yellow board with 26 shapes. Its "pop-up" mechanism was an ejector plate situated under the shaped holes and lowered by a button labeled PUSH in the center of the board. The board also included a scoreboard with four stackable pegs of different colors. One point was scored for each shape properly placed in their correct holes; if all 26 shapes were inserted before the allotted 60 seconds, the player would stop the timer and one point was also scored for each remaining second left on the clock. For tie scores, pegs were stacked on top of one another.

The original version also included red-colored cardboard "block-out" squares that were used in one of two ways. For beginners and younger players, a chosen number of holes were covered and their corresponding shapes were removed. For advanced players, a chosen number of holes were covered, but all shapes were kept in play.

In 1975, the game was changed to its current format using the "pop-up tray" in which the scoreboard and pegs, red block-out squares and four-point star shape were removed.

=== Piece names (unofficial) ===
Perfection shapes (modern variant) are fitted into a 5×5 game board

Although the instructions do not name each piece individually, players have given them nicknames based mainly on shape.

Perfection shapes
Col Row	A	B	C	D	E
5	Half Moon / Semicircle†	Square	Inverted S†	Hexagon†	Asterisk†
4	Star (Five-Pointed)†	Hot Dog	Right Triangle†	Fidget Spinner / The Y†	Rectangle
3	Parallelogram†	Arch / Rainbow	Circle	Cross Sign†	The S†
2	Pizza Slice†	Trapezoid†	Six-Pointed Star (Hexagram)†	Rhombus†	Octagon
1	Kite	Pentagon†	Tub	The X†	Triangle (Equilateral)

Shapes marked with a dagger (†) are included in Travel Perfection.

1975 and later versions have 25 shapes in a 5×5 grid; the four-pointed star included in the original 1973 version, which had 26 spaces, was removed. A version with a 4×4 grid was sold as Travel Perfection.

== Game variants ==
- Superfection (1975): In this advanced version of Perfection, the object is to assemble 16 two-piece puzzle cubes and place them in the tray within two minutes.
- Challenge Perfection (1978): Two to four players play against each other to be the first to fill their base of 18 shapes. However, the bases are different so that one player could take a piece needed by another player. This version does not feature the pop-up mechanism.
- Head-To-Head Perfection (1987): Two players compete to insert 25 shapes (in a format similar to Superfection) in their pop-up tray first and in the shortest time. Each player has a pop-up bar in front of their base; whoever completes their board first presses the bar to pop-up the opponent's tray and scatter the pieces.
- Perfection (2019, DisneyParks Theme Park Edition): Reduced piece count of 20, using shapes with Disney themes.
- Operation Perfection (2020): Combines buzzer, tweezers, and pieces of Operation with timer and pop-up mechanism of Perfection.

=== Derivative versions ===
Time Shock (Nintendo, 1972) schematic, illustrating how shape location varies with rotation of central ring

In 1972, Nintendo introduced a game with a similar timer and shape-fitting mechanic named Time Shock (タイムショック), which was created by Gunpei Yokoi and featured a two-tier, circular board with 20 spaces. This variant had a central ring, which could be rotated to change the position of the shapes, adding to the challenge.

Another clone, also named Time Shock, was sold by Sears in 1984; it used a 26-cell board similar to the one described in the 1970 patent and published with the original 1973 release. This version is still sold in Japan as Time Crash.

== Rereleases ==
In 1992, the game was relaunched with a new jingle for television advertisements, "Pop Goes Perfection," to the tune of "Pop Goes the Weasel".

In 1996, the game gained a new look and was advertised on Nickelodeon, then on YTV.

In 2025, an unknown user made a web base version online, hosted by GitHub

== International distribution ==
In the United Kingdom, the game and several of its variants was published by Action Games and Toys (Action GT).

A Japanese version of the game, which is known as Time Crash (タイムクラッシュ), uses a 26-cell board arranged similarly to the 1973 version, but with different shapes.
