= Universal City Studios, Inc. v. Nintendo Co., Ltd. =

1983 legal case

Universal v. Nintendo
- Court: United States District Court for the Southern District of New York
- Full case name: Universal City Studios, Inc. v. Nintendo Co., Ltd.
- Decided: December 22, 1983
- Citation: 578 F. Supp. 911

Court membership
- Judge sitting: Robert W. Sweet

Universal City Studios, Inc. v. Nintendo Co., Ltd. was a 1983 legal case heard by the United States District Court for the Southern District of New York by Judge Robert W. Sweet. In their complaint, Universal Studios alleged that Nintendo's video game Donkey Kong was a trademark infringement of King Kong, the plot and characters of which Universal claimed as their own. Nintendo argued that Universal had themselves proven that King Kong's plot and characters were in the public domain in Universal City Studios, Inc. v. RKO General, Inc.

Sweet ruled that Universal had acted in bad faith by threatening Nintendo's licensees and that it had no right over the name King Kong or the characters and story. He further held that there was no possibility for consumers to confuse Nintendo's game and characters with the King Kong films and their characters. Universal appealed the case, but the judgment was upheld. The case was a major victory for Nintendo, which was still a newcomer to the U.S. market. The case established Nintendo as a major player in the industry and arguably gave the company the confidence that it could compete with the giants of American media.

== Background ==
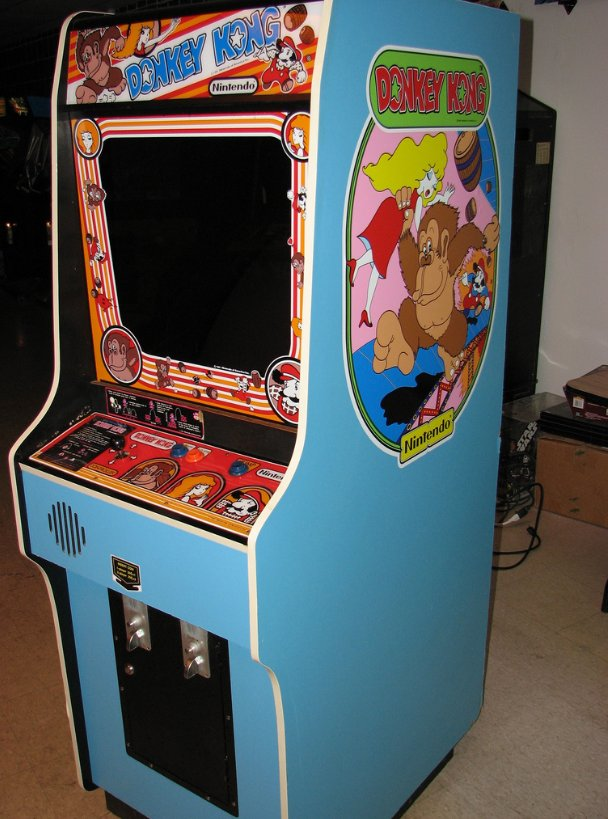
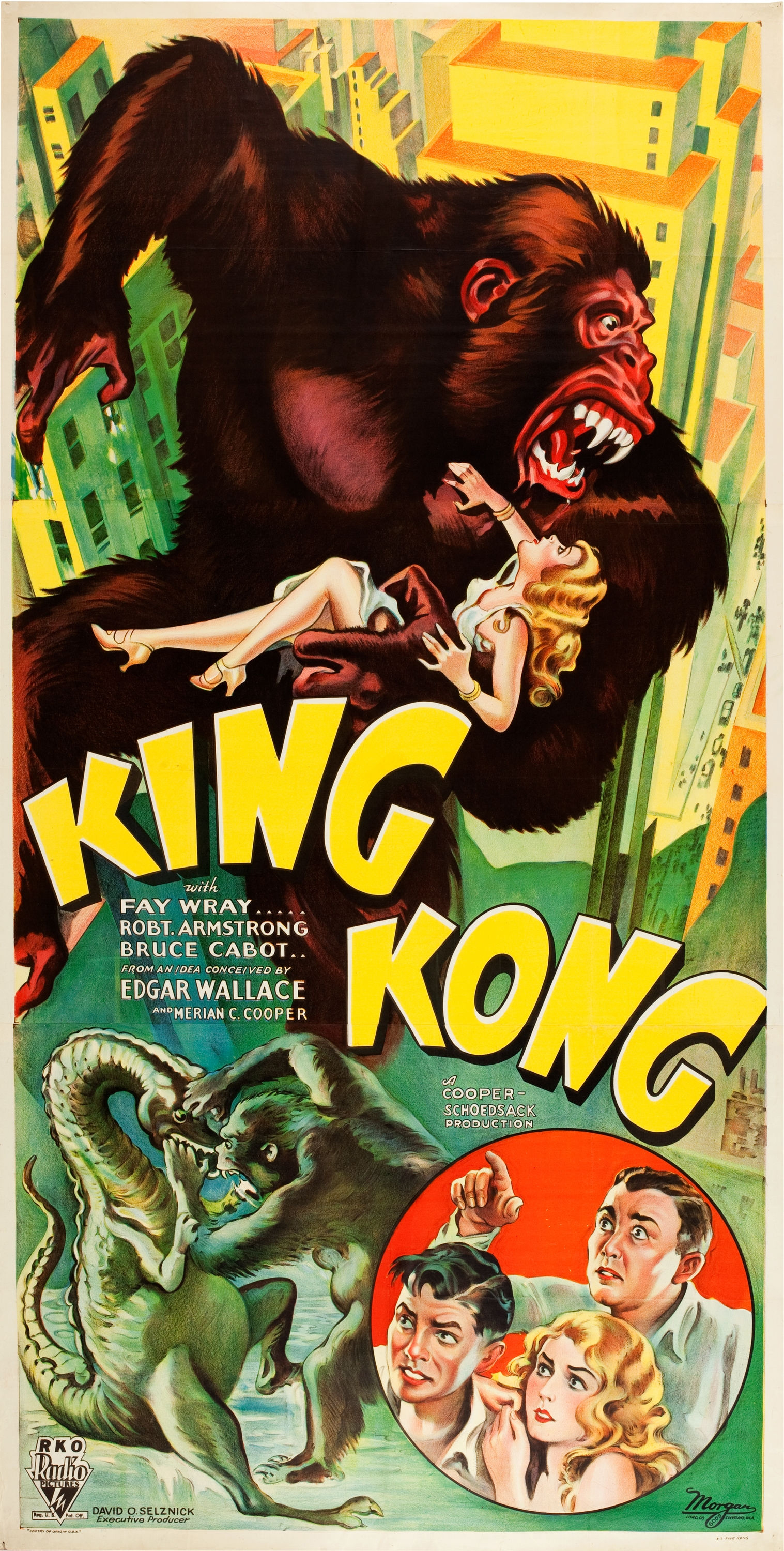
A Donkey Kong arcade machine (left) and a poster for King Kong (right)

In 1982, Sid Sheinberg, the president of MCA and Universal City Studios and a seasoned attorney, was trying to find a way to get his company into the booming video game market. In April, he learned of the success of Nintendo's Donkey Kong video game and sent Robert Hadl, vice president of legislative matters, to investigate. Hadl's analysis was that Donkey Kong's storyline was based on that of King Kong and was thus an infringement of Universal's rights to that film's characters and scenario.

Sheinberg also learned of a licensing agreement between Nintendo and Coleco, a producer of home video game consoles. Sheinberg scheduled a meeting with Coleco president Arnold Greenberg on April 27, ostensibly to discuss possible investment in Coleco. Instead, Universal admonished Greenberg for copyright infringement and threatened to sue if the ColecoVision shipped with Donkey Kong as planned. The next day, Universal telexed Coleco and Nintendo giving them 48 hours to cease marketing Donkey Kong, to dispose of all Donkey Kong inventory, and to hand over all records of profits made from the game. On May 5, Greenberg agreed to pay Universal royalties of 3% of Donkey Kong's net sale price, amounting to six million units and worth about $4.6 million. A week later, he signed an agreement that stated that Universal would not sue Coleco as long as Coleco paid royalties.

Meanwhile, Hadl learned that Tiger Electronics had licensed King Kong for a handheld game. He decided that Universal's earnings from it were too low and that the license's granting of exclusive rights to Tiger would impede the agreement with Coleco. On May 4, Sheinberg sent Tiger a mailgram demanding that they send their game in for further approval. Universal reviewed it and decided that King Kong was too similar to Donkey Kong. On May 8, Sheinberg revoked Tiger's license, but Tiger president O. R. Rissman refused to give in and challenged Universal's claim that it owned the King Kong name.

Nintendo's attorney (and future board member) Howard Lincoln was at first inclined to settle for $5–7 million. Eventually, however, he decided to fight, reassuring the head of the company's U.S. division, Minoru Arakawa, that this was a sign that Nintendo had made it big. On May 6, Arakawa and Lincoln met with Coleco and Universal in Los Angeles. Hadl reiterated his stance that Donkey Kong infringed Universal's rights to King Kong. Lincoln countered that Nintendo had discovered many unlicensed uses of King Kong's name and characters and that Universal's trademark on these was less than 10 years old. In private, Greenberg tried to persuade Nintendo to sign a licensing agreement; he had not told them that he had already done so. By the end of the meeting, Hadl agreed to send a chain of title to Nintendo regarding Universal's ownership of the King Kong name. When this failed to materialize in the next few weeks, Lincoln prodded Universal again. They responded with more demands for royalties.

Lincoln researched the merits of Universal's claims to King Kong and deemed them untenable. Nintendo called for another meeting, which was set up for May 21. Believing that Nintendo was finally caving, Sheinberg intimated that Nintendo might expect future business from Universal if they agreed to settle the matter. Lincoln only repeated Nintendo's position that Universal had no legal basis to make any threats. He recalled later:

Mr. Arakawa and I decided that we would go down and simply tell him [Sheinberg] that we've come to tell you to your face that we would pay you if we thought we were liable, but we had done our homework and we were not prepared to pay anything because we hadn't done anything wrong. We just wanted to essentially look him in the face and tell him that. It seemed the honorable thing to do. As it turned out, maybe Hadl had led him to believe that we had come down to reach some sort of monetary settlement with him. And it was really funny because it was not what he was expecting and his reaction was shock.

Knowing that a court battle lay ahead, Hadl contacted Rissman, the errant Tiger licensee, to compromise on the handheld King Kong game. Hadl wanted to remove the exclusivity provision of the license and to distinguish the handheld game from Donkey Kong so as to weaken any potential counterclaims that one of Universal's licensees had violated Nintendo's intellectual property rights. Rissman complied, giving the hero a fireman hat, replacing barrel graphics with bombs, and making the game platforms straight instead of crooked. This design was approved in early June.

== First District court decision ==
On June 29, 1982, Universal officially sued Nintendo. The company also announced that it had agreed to license the rights to King Kong to Coleco. On January 3, 1983, Universal then sent cease-and-desist letters to Nintendo's licensees offering three options: stop using Donkey Kong characters, obtain a license from Universal, or be sued. Six licensees caved, but Milton Bradley refused to do so. When Ralston Purina's offer of $5,000 for the use of Donkey Kong characters on breakfast cereal was turned down, they also refused to settle.

John Kirby, c. 2010s

Lincoln hired John Kirby to represent Nintendo in court. Kirby had won other big cases for the likes of PepsiCo., General Foods, and Warner-Lambert. Kirby researched the game's development, taking depositions from designer Shigeru Miyamoto and Nintendo president Hiroshi Yamauchi in Japan. Miyamoto claimed that he had in fact called his ape character King Kong at first, as that was a generic term in Japan for any large ape.

Universal City Studios, Inc. v. Nintendo, Co., Ltd. was heard at the United States District Court for the Southern District of New York by Judge Robert W. Sweet. The trial lasted seven days, during which Universal, represented by the New York firm Townley & Updike, argued that the name Donkey Kong could be confused with King Kong and that the plot of the game was an infringement on that of the film. Kirby showed key differences between Donkey Kong and King Kong. He also alleged that Universal had no rights to the King Kong characters and that they had in fact successfully sued RKO Pictures in 1975 in Universal City Studios, Inc. v. RKO General, Inc., wherein they proved that the plot of King Kong was in the public domain (by way of the original film's novelization) and thus opened the way for Dino De Laurentiis' remake.

Sweet ruled that Universal did not have any trademark in King Kong, because King Kong did not designate a single source, and even if King Kong was a Universal trademark, the possibility that anyone would confuse Donkey Kong and King Kong was unlikely. In his opinion, Donkey Kong was "comical" and the ape character "farcical, childlike and nonsexual". The King Kong character, on the other hand, was "a ferocious gorilla in quest of a beautiful woman". Sweet declared that "at best, Donkey Kong is a parody of King Kong".

== First appeal ==
Universal appealed the verdict to the United States Court of Appeals for the Second Circuit. Nintendo and Universal argued the appeals case on May 23, 1984. As evidence of consumer confusion, Universal presented the results of a telephone survey of 150 managers and owners of arcades, bowling alleys, and pizza restaurants who owned or leased Donkey Kong machines. To the question "To the best of your knowledge, was the Donkey Kong game made with the approval or under the authority of the people who produce the King Kong movies?", 18% of those surveyed answered in the affirmative, but to the question "As far as you know, who makes Donkey Kong?", no one named Universal. Universal argued that this was enough evidence to show that consumers were confused about the distinction between the two names.

They also provided six examples from print media of more cases of confusion between Donkey Kong and King Kong. The October 1982 issue of Videogaming Illustrated, for example, was shown to read "our Donkey Kong presentation continues as we look at other gorillas who have had a fondness for women. Prominent among them is King Kong, who has much in common with the video villain". Another example was Craig Kubey's 1982 The Winner's Book of Video Games, which states that "Donkey Kong [is] a video version of the film classic King Kong".

In its decision on October 4, the court upheld the previous verdict. They declared that "the two properties have nothing in common but a gorilla, a captive woman, a male rescuer, and a building scenario". Further, the court ruled that "the 'Kong' and 'King Kong' names are widely used by the general public and are associated with apes and other objects of enormous proportions". As for Universal's survey, the court found it unconvincing, as Universal did not own the "image . . . of King Kong climbing the Empire State Building/World Trade Center with Fay Wray/Jessica Lange in his paw" and that by only soliciting opinions from people who already had Donkey Kong games, the survey failed to establish confusion from potential customers. Finally, the survey asked "an obvious leading question in that it suggested its own answer".

Regarding Universal's printed examples, the court found that:

The statements cited by Universal recognize that the Donkey Kong theme loosely evokes the King Kong films. However, none of the statements remotely suggests that the authors were under the impression that Donkey Kong was connected with the company holding the King Kong trademark.

The court agreed that some consumers were confused about the two marks: "However, the fact that there may be a few confused consumers does not create a sufficiently disputed issue of fact regarding the likelihood of confusion so as to make summary judgment improper".

== Counterclaims and second appeal ==
Nintendo filed its counterclaims as part of its answer to the complaints by Universal in 1982.

Sweet ruled the cease-and-desist letters that Universal had sent to Nintendo's licensees gave the game company the right to seek damages, and so Universal would pay Nintendo $1.8 million for "legal fees, photocopying expenses, costs incurred creating graphs and charts, and lost revenues".

Sweet chastised Universal for bringing this bad faith lawsuit:

Throughout this litigation, Universal knew, as a result of the RKO litigation, that it had no rights to any visual image of King Kong from the classic movie or its remake. Nonetheless, Universal, when it seemed beneficial, made sweeping assertions of rights, attempting to extract license agreements from companies incapable of or unwilling to confront Universal's "profit center".

Nintendo was given the option to either take Universal's licensing profits for their game or accept statutory damages. Nintendo opted for the former, receiving $56,689.41. Nintendo also received damages and attorney's fees.

Sweet also ruled that Tiger's King Kong was an infringement of Donkey Kong:

Donkey Kong's particular expression of a gorilla villain and a carpenter hero (with or without a fire hat) who must dodge various obstacles (whether bombs or fireballs) while climbing up ladders (whether complete or broken) and picking up prizes (umbrellas or purses) to rescue a fair-haired (whether knotted or pigtailed) hostage from the gorilla is protractible against Universal and its licensees.

He ruled against Nintendo's claims to damages from Universal establishing licenses with Nintendo's licensees in those cases where the licensees continued to pay Nintendo.

Nintendo's licensees, Coleco among them, filed their own counterclaims. Universal paid Coleco by buying stock in the company.

Universal and Nintendo both appealed the counterclaims suit. The case was argued on June 16, 1986.

In the decision, rendered on July 15, the court upheld the previous verdicts, ruling that:

First, Universal knew that it did not have trademark rights to King Kong, yet it proceeded to broadly assert such rights anyway. This amounted to a wanton and reckless disregard of Nintendo's rights.

Second, Universal did not stop after it asserted its rights to Nintendo. It embarked on a deliberate, systematic campaign to coerce all of Nintendo's third party licensees to either stop marketing Donkey Kong products or pay Universal royalties.

Finally, Universal's conduct amounted to an abuse of judicial process, and in that sense caused a longer harm to the public as a whole. Depending on the commercial results, Universal alternatively argued to the courts, first, that King Kong was a part of the public domain, and then second, that King Kong was not part of the public domain, and that Universal possessed exclusive trademark rights in it. Universal's assertions in court were based not on any good faith belief in their truth, but on the mistaken belief that it could use the courts to turn a profit.

Nintendo thanked John Kirby with a $30,000 sailboat christened the Donkey Kong along with "exclusive worldwide rights to use the name for sailboats". The title character in Nintendo's Kirby series of video games was named after John Kirby, in honor of his services in the Donkey Kong case. It is rumored that a copy of the first game in the franchise, Kirby's Dream Land, was eventually sent to John Kirby who was amused and flattered.

== Impact ==
Nadia Oxford of 1UP.com concluded that Nintendo's legal victory allowed their up-and-coming company to establish a foothold in America, as well as preparing them for future legal battles with Atari.

== See also ==
- Copyright protection for fictional characters
- Lewis Galoob Toys, Inc. v. Nintendo of America, Inc.
