= Donkey Kong (1981 video game) =

1981 video game

- North American arcade flyer by Leslie Cabarga
- Developer: Nintendo R&D1 (Note: Atari 2600, ColecoVision, and Intellivision versions developed by Coleco; NES version developed by Nintendo R&D2; Atari 8-bit, Apple II, IBM PC, TI-99/4A, VIC-20 and North American Commodore 64 versions developed by Atari, Inc.; MSX, ZX Spectrum, and European Commodore 64 versions developed by Ocean Software; Atari 7800 version developed by Atari Corporation.)
- Publishers: Nintendo: 2600, ColecoVision, Intellivision; NA: Coleco; EU: CBS Electronics Atari 8-bit Atari, Inc. Apple II, IBM PC, TI-99/4A, VIC-20 Atarisoft C64; NA: Atarisoft; EU: Ocean Software CPC, ZX Spectrum Ocean Software 7800 Atari Corporation
- Director: Shigeru Miyamoto
- Producer: Gunpei Yokoi
- Designers: Shigeru Miyamoto; Gunpei Yokoi
- Artist: Shigeru Miyamoto
- Composer: Yukio Kaneoka
- Series: Donkey Kong
- Platform: Arcade: Game & Watch, Atari 2600, ColecoVision, Intellivision, Coleco Mini-Arcade, Atari 8-bit, NES, TI-99/4A, IBM PC, VIC-20, Commodore 64, MSX, ZX Spectrum, Apple II, Amstrad CPC, Famicom Disk System, Atari 7800, Nintendo e-Reader, Game Boy Advance
- Release: July 9, 1981: Arcade; JP: July 9, 1981 (Note: Limited publication on July 9, 1981. Wide release in mid-July 1981.); NA: October 1981; EU: November 1981; Game & Watch; June 3, 1982; 2600; July 1982; ColecoVision; NA: August 1982; EU: 1983; Intellivision; September 1982; NES; JP: July 15, 1983; NA: June 1986; EU: October 15, 1986; TI-99/4A; November 1983; VIC-20; February 1984; C64; NA: March 1984; EU: December 1986; CPC, ZX Spectrum; EU: December 1986; Famicom Disk System; JP: April 8, 1988; 7800; November 1988; e-Reader; NA: November 11, 2002; Game Boy Advance; JP: February 14, 2004; NA: June 7, 2004; EU: July 9, 2004
- Genre: Platform
- Mode: Single-player
- Arcade system: Radar Scope

Donkey Kong (Note: Japanese: ドンキーコング, Hepburn: Donkī Kongu) is a 1981 platform game developed and published by Nintendo for arcades. As Mario (occasionally referred to as "Jumpman" at the time), the player runs and jumps onto platforms and climbs ladders to ascend a construction site and rescue Pauline (occasionally referred to as "The Lady" at the time) from the giant gorilla Donkey Kong. It is the first game in the Donkey Kong series and Mario's first appearance in a video game.

Donkey Kong was created to salvage unsold arcade cabinets following the failure of Nintendo's Radar Scope (1980), and was designed for Nintendo of America's audience. Hiroshi Yamauchi, Nintendo's president at the time, assigned the project to first-time video game designer Shigeru Miyamoto. Drawing inspiration from "Beauty and the Beast" and American media such as Popeye and King Kong, Miyamoto developed the characters and scenario and designed the game alongside chief engineer Gunpei Yokoi. Donkey Kong was the most complex arcade game released at that point, using graphics for characterization, including cutscenes to illustrate a plot, and integrating multiple unique stages into the gameplay. The game pioneered the platform genre before the term existed, is the first to feature jumping, and is one of the first video games with a damsel in distress narrative, after Sheriff. It had a limited release in Japan on July 9, 1981, before receiving a wide release in the region some weeks later.

Although Nintendo of America's staff was initially apprehensive, Donkey Kong was a critical and commercial success, becoming the highest-grossing game of 1981 in Japan and the highest-grossing game of 1982 in the United States. It was ported to the Game & Watch, selling eight million units, while Nintendo licensed the game to Coleco, a developer of arcade conversions for home consoles, selling six million cartridges. It was later ported to the Famicom/Nintendo Entertainment System (NES), which was designed to replicate the arcade unit's technological capabilities; both the game and NES were integral in introducing Japanese video games to Western audiences. Donkey Kong's various ports sold more than 15 million units worldwide. Other companies cloned the game and avoided royalties altogether. Universal City Studios unsuccessfully sued Nintendo, alleging that Donkey Kong violated its trademark of the King Kong franchise.

Donkey Kong is regarded as one of the most important games of the golden age of arcade video games and one of the greatest video games of all time. Its success positioned Nintendo for market dominance during the 1980s and 1990s. The game debuted Mario, who became Nintendo's mascot and one of the world's most recognizable characters. It was mass-marketed through a wide range of products, including breakfast cereal, toys, and television cartoons. The game has been frequently referenced in popular culture and subsequent video games, and maintains an active high score competition.

== Gameplay ==
The first stage, with Mario holding a hammer power-up which he uses to smash barrels

Following 1980's Space Panic, Donkey Kong is one of the earliest examples of the platform game genre, even prior to the term being coined; the U.S. gaming press used "climbing game" for games with platforms and ladders. As the first platformer game to feature jumping, Donkey Kong requires the player to jump between gaps and over obstacles or approaching enemies whilst Donkey Kong throws barrels at the player, setting the template for the future of the genre. With four unique stages, Donkey Kong was the most complex arcade game of the time, and one of the first arcade games with multiple stages, following games such as 1980's Phoenix and 1981's Gorf and Scramble.

In addition to the goal of saving Pauline, the player has a score. Points are awarded for the following: leaping over obstacles; destroying objects with a hammer power-up; collecting items such as hats, parasols, and purses; removing rivets from platforms; and completing each stage according to a steadily decreasing bonus counter. The player starts with three lives with a bonus life awarded at 7,000 points. A life is lost when Mario touches Donkey Kong or any enemy object, falls too far, or lets the bonus counter reach zero. The game ends when all lives are lost.

Each of the four single-screen stages represents 25 meters of the structure Donkey Kong has climbed: 25, 50, 75, and 100 meters. Stage one involves Mario scaling a construction site made of crooked girders and ladders while jumping over or hammering barrels and oil drums tossed by Donkey Kong. Stage two involves climbing a five-story structure of conveyor belts, each of which transport cement pans. The third stage involves the player riding elevators while avoiding bouncing springs. The final stage requires Mario to remove eight rivets from the platforms supporting Donkey Kong; this causes Donkey Kong to fall and the hero to be reunited with Pauline. These four stages combine to form one level.

After each level, the stages repeat with increased difficulty. For example, Donkey Kong begins to hurl barrels faster and sometimes diagonally, and fireballs speed up. The victory music alternates between levels 1 and 2. The fourth level consists of five stages with the final stage at 125 meters.

=== Bugs and exploits ===
The first stage of level 22, the 130th stage overall, is colloquially known as the kill screen because of a programming error that kills Mario after a few seconds, effectively ending the game. In January 2025, a glitch was discovered via a tool-assisted superplay which sometimes allows climbing straight to the top of the kill screen from the starting point. This allows continuing the game until the 135th stage. Due to the limits of the joystick used, it is impossible to perform this trick on an actual Donkey Kong arcade machine within the stage's time limit.

== Plot ==
Donkey Kong is the earliest video game with a storyline that visually unfolds on screen. Set on a construction site in New York City, the eponymous Donkey Kong character is the de facto villain. The hero is a carpenter originally unnamed in the Japanese arcade release, later called Jumpman, then Mario. Donkey Kong kidnaps Mario's girlfriend, originally known as Lady and later renamed Pauline. The player takes the role of Mario to rescue her. This is the first occurrence of the damsel in distress scenario used in countless video games released after.

control panel of Donkey Kong arcade game

The game uses graphics and animation for characterization. Donkey Kong smirks upon Mario's demise. Pauline has a pink dress and long hair, and a speech balloon crying "HELP!". Mario, depicted in red overalls and a red cap, is an everyman character, a type common in Japan. Graphical limitations and the low pixel resolution of the small sprites prompted his design. A mustache implies a mouth, a cap obviates the animation of hair, and colored overalls distinguish his arm movements. The artwork of the cabinets and promotional materials make these cartoon-like character designs even more explicit. Pauline, for example, is disheveled like King Kong's Fay Wray in a torn dress and stiletto heels.

Like Pac-Man (1980), Donkey Kong has cutscenes, but innovates by advancing a complete plot. The game opens with the gorilla climbing a pair of ladders to the top of a construction site, accompanied by a variation on the musical theme from Dragnet. He drops Pauline and stomps his feet, warping the steel beams. He moves to his final perch and sneers. A melody plays, and the level starts. This sequence sets the scene and adds background to the gameplay—a first for video games. At the end of the stage, a heart appears between Mario and Pauline, but Donkey Kong grabs her and climbs higher, causing the heart to break. The narrative concludes when Mario reaches the end of the rivet stage, when he and Pauline are reunited.

== Development ==
original Donkey Kong arcade cabinet

Nintendo of America was founded in 1980 with minor success at importing its parent's arcade cabinets from Japan. In early 1981, its president Minoru Arakawa bet the small startup company on a major order of 3,000 Radar Scope games. Its poor reception in America filled a warehouse with 2,000 unsold Radar Scope machines, so Arakawa requested that the parent company president (and his father-in-law) Hiroshi Yamauchi send a conversion kit of new game software. Yamauchi polled the company's entire talent pool for fresh game design concepts to save the distressed startup. This yielded Shigeru Miyamoto's debut as lead game designer of his Donkey Kong concept, and Yamauchi appointed head engineer Gunpei Yokoi as project supervisor with a budget of $267,000 (equivalent to $946,000 in 2025) according to Miyamoto.

The conception of Donkey Kong can be traced back to early 1980, when Miyamoto made three A4-size sheets briefly explaining the game's content and characters, about five game screen sketches, and a one-sheet diagram of the final animation. Ikegami Tsushinki was subcontracted for most of the development, heavily involved in the game's creation and concept, and to provide "mechanical programming assistance to fix the software created by Nintendo". Nintendo instructed Ikegami to produce a program according to its instructions and put it onto read-only memory (ROM) chips on printed circuit boards. This later led to mutual lawsuits in 1983, as Ikegami asserted ownership over Donkey Kong which Nintendo denied as Ikegami was a subcontractor who had already been paid. Game Machine called it "simply a nuisance tactic" on the part of Ikegami. Production on Donkey Kong began in January 1981 and lasted between 4–5 months, as Miyamoto was focused on developing it for a global market rather than just for Japan.

The game was originally designed to have Mario escape from a maze, and jumping was not yet implemented, making platforming too difficult. The four screens were also supposed to make up a single long stage, but this idea was scrapped due to the inability to implement vertical scrolling. By late March 1981, Nintendo was also pursuing a license to make a game based on the Popeye comic strip, tentatively titled Popeye's Beer Barrel Attack Game. In this iteration of the game, the player, as Popeye, would attempt to rescue Olive Oyl from Bluto in a similar manner to the final game, with the first level being completed by having the player use a jack to bend the top girder upwards, causing the barrels to roll back towards Bluto. After experiencing difficulty portraying the Popeye characters within the limits of the game hardware, Nintendo elected to replace Bluto with a newly created gorilla character before ultimately deciding to make the rest of the game's cast original, reserving the Popeye IP for future use. (Note: The decision to not use the Popeye characters is often erroneously attributed to claims that Nintendo was unable to secure the license from King Features.) Miyamoto came up with many characters and plot concepts, but he settled on a love triangle between a gorilla (originally envisioned as a man in a gorilla suit), a carpenter with a large hammer, and a girlfriend, mirroring the original rivalry between Bluto and Popeye for Olive Oyl. The ape that had originally replaced Bluto would evolve into the titular Donkey Kong, which Miyamoto said was "nothing too evil or repulsive". He would be the pet of the main character, "a funny, hang-loose kind of guy". Miyamoto has named "Beauty and the Beast" and the 1933 film King Kong as influences. Although its origin as a comic strip license played a major part, Donkey Kong marked the first time that the storyline for a video game preceded the game's programming rather than simply being appended as an afterthought. An unrelated Popeye game was released by Nintendo for the Game & Watch the following month, as well as a game called Popeye for arcades in 1982.

Full-scale development began in early April 1981 when then-manager Masayo Oka instructed Minoru Iinuma, Mitsuhiro Nishida, Yasuhiro Murata, and Hirohisa Komanome to stop what they were working on and assemble together in a meeting room for a new project. He explained that the purpose of this development was to use up the large amount of leftover PCB inventory and create a new game that made the most of the hardware capabilities. They were scheduled to complete the game in mid-June of that year. Yamauchi wanted primarily to target the North American market, so he mandated that the game be given an English title, as with many previous Nintendo games. The story of how "Donkey Kong" received its name varies. Several sources cite Miyamoto as the one who named the character; it is claimed that Miyamoto looked in a Japanese-English dictionary for something that would mean "stubborn gorilla", or that "Donkey" was meant to convey "silly" or "stubborn"; "Kong" was common Japanese slang for "gorilla". A rival claim is that the name came from Nintendo's export manager, Shinichi Todori, who was tasked to localize the game in America. Todori picked "Donkey Kong" out of a list containing twenty potential names, with "Donkey" being meant to represent "stupid and goofy". A false urban myth also claimed that the name was originally meant to be "Monkey Kong", but was misspelled or misinterpreted due to a blurred fax or bad telephone connection. In 2001, Miyamoto stated that he thought the name would convey the thought of a "stupid ape". Other potential names for the game included Big Kong, Giant Kong, Mad Kong, Kong on the Run, Kong Chase, Steel Kong, Funny Kong, City Kong, Heart & Kong, Lady & Kong, Attack the Kong, Kong Attacker, Build On, and Family Kong.

Miyamoto had high hopes for his new project. He was not a programmer, so he consulted technicians for feasibility. He wanted to make the characters different sizes, and have different movements and reactions. Yokoi thought Miyamoto's original design was too complex, though he had some difficult suggestions, such as using see-saws to catapult the hero across the screen which was eventually found too hard to program. Miyamoto then thought of using sloped platforms, barrels, and ladders. When he specified that the game would have multiple stages, the four-man programming team complained that he was essentially asking them to implement the game repeatedly. Nevertheless, they followed Miyamoto's design, creating a total of approximately 20 kilobytes of content. Yukio Kaneoka composed a soundtrack to serve as background music for the levels and story events.

The circuit board of Radar Scope was restructured for Donkey Kong. The Radar Scope hardware, originally inspired by the Namco Galaxian hardware, was designed for a large number of enemies moving around at high speeds, which Donkey Kong does not require, so the development team removed unnecessary functions and reduced the scale of the circuit board. The gameplay and graphics were reworked for updated ROM chips; the existing CPU, sound hardware, and monitor were left intact. The character set, scoreboard, upper HUD display, and font are almost identical to Radar Scope, with palette differences. The Donkey Kong hardware has the memory capacity for displaying 128 foreground sprites at 16x16 pixels each and 256 background tiles at 8x8 pixels each. Mario and all moving objects use single sprites, the taller Pauline uses two sprites, and the larger Donkey Kong uses six sprites.

Hiroshi Yamauchi thought the game was going to sell well and phoned to inform Arakawa. Nintendo of America's distributors, Ron Judy and Al Stone, brought Arakawa to the lawyer Howard Lincoln to secure a trademark.

The game was sent to Nintendo of America for testing. The sales manager disliked it for being too different from the maze and shooter games common at the time, and Judy and Lincoln expressed reservations over the strange title. Still, Arakawa adamantly believed that it would be a hit. American staff began translating the storyline for the cabinet art and naming the characters. They chose "Pauline" for the Lady, after Polly James, wife of Nintendo's warehouse manager Don James. Arakawa suggested that the name of "Jumpman", a name originally chosen for its similarity to the popular brands Walkman and Pac-Man, be changed to "Mario" after Mario Segale, the landlord of the original office space of Nintendo of America. These character names were used in promotional materials, although Mario was called Jumpman in the operations manual and instructions. Donkey Kong was ready for release.

The game was completed in mid-June 1981 after debugging and adjustments, shipping a few ROMs for location tests a few days after. Stone and Judy convinced the managers of two bars in Seattle, Washington, to set up Donkey Kong machines. The managers initially showed reluctance, but when they saw sales of $30 a day—or 120 plays—for a solid week, they requested more units. In their Redmond headquarters, a skeleton crew composed of Arakawa, his wife Yoko, James, Judy, Phillips, and Stone converted 2,000 Radar Scope machines to Donkey Kong using conversion kits imported from Japan, consisting of motherboards, power supplies, and marquee graphics. The game officially went on sale in July 1981.

== Ports ==
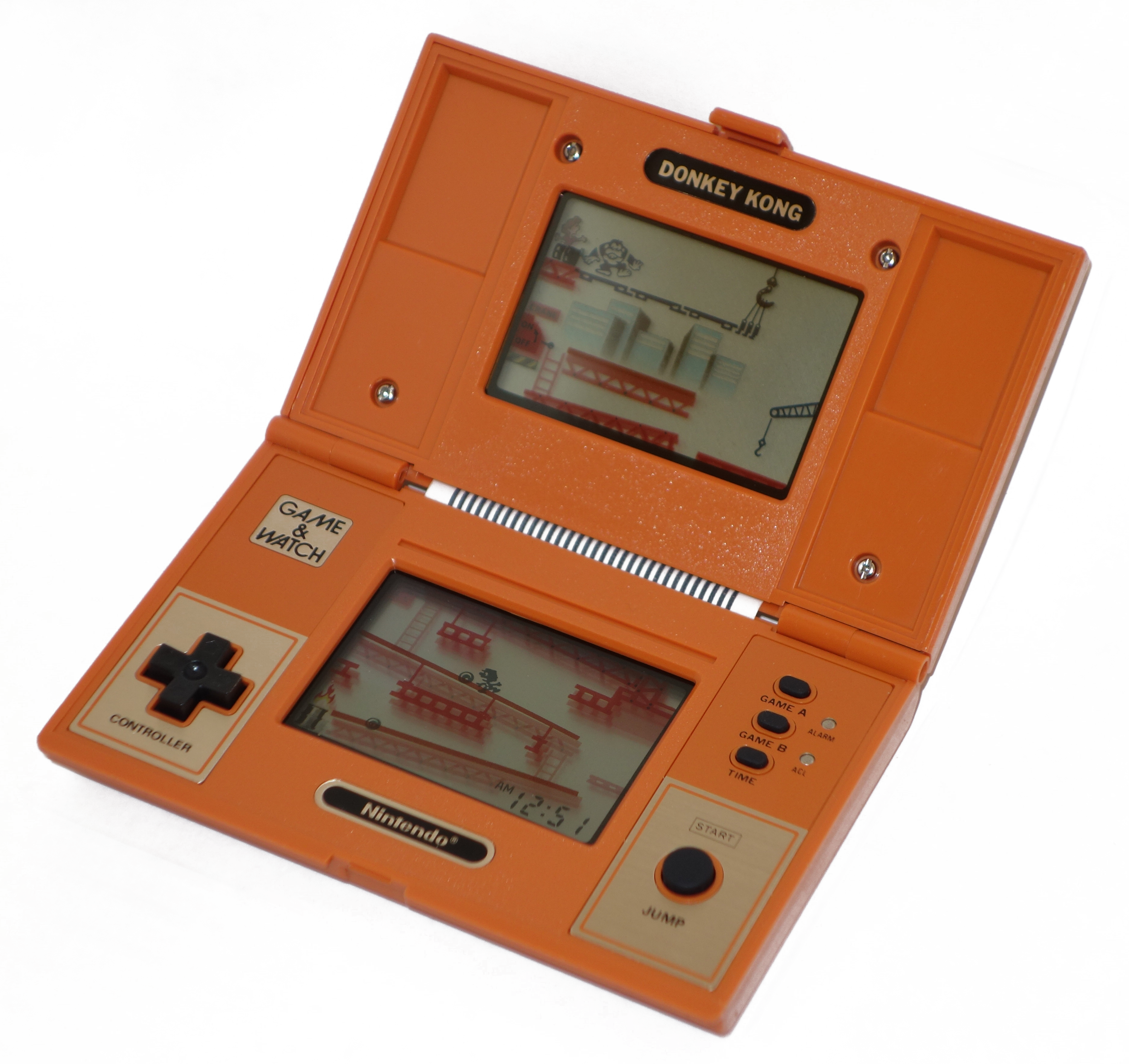
The Game & Watch port of Donkey Kong is the first device to feature the modern D-pad.

=== Coleco ===
Makers of video game consoles were interested. Taito offered a considerable fee for all rights to Donkey Kong, but Nintendo declined after three days of internal discussion. Rivals Coleco and Atari, Inc. approached Nintendo in Japan and the United States respectively. In the end, Yamauchi granted Coleco exclusive console and tabletop rights to Donkey Kong because he believed that "it [was] the hungriest company". In addition, Arakawa believed that as a more established company in the U.S., Coleco could better handle marketing. In return, Nintendo received an undisclosed lump sum plus $1.40 per game cartridge sold and $1 per tabletop unit. On December 24, 1981, Howard Lincoln drafted the contract. He included language that Coleco would be held liable for anything on the game cartridge, an unusual clause for a licensing agreement. Arakawa signed the document the next day, and, on February 1, 1982, Yamauchi persuaded the Coleco representative in Japan to sign without review by the company's lawyers.

Coleco bundled the game with the ColecoVision console, which went on sale in August 1982, though the individual cartridge was also available in stores. In a 2023 interview, former Coleco vice president of product development Bert Reiner said that every ColecoVision was sold with a Donkey Kong cartridge. Coleco offered Atari 2600 and Intellivision versions as well. Coleco's Atari 2600 port was programmed by Garry Kitchen. Kitchen was contracted to port the game through his brother Steve, who had connections to an executive at Coleco. He was given only three or four months to develop the port and worked without sleep for the last 72 hours before shipping. Kitchen received no assistance from Nintendo and minimal aid from Coleco, who only provided him with an arcade machine for temporary use. These factors combined with the limited memory of Atari 2600 cartridges forced him to omit two of the original game's four levels. Coleco's sales subsequently doubled to $500 million and its earnings quadrupled to $40 million. Coleco also released stand-alone Mini-Arcade tabletop versions of Donkey Kong, along with Pac-Man, Galaxian, and Frogger in 1982. Coleco also bundled a copy of Donkey Kong with its Atari VCS clone, the Coleco Gemini, in 1983.

=== Atari ===
Atari, Inc. obtained the license for home computer versions of Donkey Kong and released it for the Atari 8-bit computers. When Coleco unveiled the Adam Computer, running a port of Donkey Kong at the 1983 Consumer Electronics Show in Chicago, Illinois, Atari protested that it was in violation of the licensing agreement. Nintendo president Hiroshi Yamauchi demanded that Coleco president Arnold Greenberg withdraw his Adam port. Greenberg complied, and the port was not published.

The Atari 8-bit conversion of Donkey Kong contains one of the longest-undiscovered Easter eggs in a video game. Programmer Landon Dyer's initials appear if the player dies under certain conditions and returns to the title screen. This remained undiscovered for 26 years until Dyer revealed it on his blog, stating that "there's an Easter egg, but it's totally not worth it, and I don't remember how to bring it up anyway". The steps required to trigger it were later discovered by Don Hodges, who used an emulator and a debugger to trace through the game's code.

=== Famicom/NES ===
The game was ported by Nintendo Research & Development 2 to Nintendo's Family Computer (Famicom) console and released in Japan on July 15, 1983, as one of the system's three launch games. Masayuki Uemura, the Famicom's lead architect, designed the console specifically to faithfully recreate Donkey Kong. After the console was released in the West as the Nintendo Entertainment System (NES) in 1985, Donkey Kong became one of the first titles in the console's Arcade Classics Series, released in June 1986 in North America and on October 15 in Europe. Omitted are the cement factory stage and most of the cutscenes, since early ROM cartridges do not have enough memory. It includes a new song composed by Yukio Kaneoka for the title screen. Both Donkey Kong and its sequel, Donkey Kong Jr., are included in the 1988 NES compilation Donkey Kong Classics.

=== Game Boy ===
A complete remake of the original arcade game on the Game Boy, titled Donkey Kong (referred to as Donkey Kong '94 during development) contains levels from both the original Donkey Kong and Donkey Kong Jr. arcades. It starts with the same gameplay and four locations as the arcade game and then progresses to 97 additional puzzle-based levels. It is the first game to have built-in enhancement for the Super Game Boy system.

== Reception ==
Reception

Review scores
Publication	Score
AllGame	5/5 (Arcade); 4.5/5 (ColecoVision)
Computer and Video Games	Positive (Arcade); 16/16 (ColecoVision); 45% (NES); 32% (VCS)
Computer Games	Positive (Adam); Classic (computers)
Electronic Fun with Computers & Games	A (ColecoVision)
Electronic Games	9/10 (ColecoVision)
Joystik	5/5 (ColecoVision); 1/5 (Atari VCS); 1/5 (Intellivision)
Video Games Player	A (ColecoVision)

Upon release in arcades, Computer and Video Games compared it favorably with King Kong and predicted that it would likely become a success. In his 1982 book Video Invaders, Steve Bloom described Donkey Kong as "another bizarre cartoon game, courtesy of Japan" and said it was one of the "most exciting variations" on Pac-Man's maze theme along with Sega's Frogger due to how players need to "scale from the bottom of the screen to the top" which make them "more like obstacle courses than mazes" since "you always know where you're going — up". In January 1983, the 1982 Arcade Awards gave it the award for the best single-player video game and the Certificate of Merit as runner-up for Coin-Op Game of the Year.

In September 1982, Arcade Express reviewed the ColecoVision port and scored it 9 out of 10. Creative Computing Video & Arcade Games in 1983 stated that "Coleco did a fabulous job" with Donkey Kong, the best of the console's first five games and "the most faithful adaptation of the original video game I have seen". The magazine's Danny Goodman stated that of Coleco's three console versions, the one for the ColecoVision was the best, followed by Atari and Intellivision. Computer and Video Games reviewed the ColecoVision port in its September 1984 issue and scored it 4 out of 4 in all four categories of Action, Graphics, Addiction and Theme. Ed Driscoll reviewed the Atari VCS version of Donkey Kong in The Space Gamer No. 59. Edwards commented that the game is near perfect and that anyone can be caught in Donkey Kong "fever".

=== Commercial performance ===
Donkey Kong was popular worldwide, garnering a positive reaction from consumers, and was a significant commercial success for Nintendo, pulling them out of financial troubles. After the game's initial 2,000 arcade cabinets sold out, more orders were made. Arakawa began manufacturing the electronic components in Redmond because waiting for shipments from Japan was taking too long. The game's success led to Arakawa expanding Nintendo of America. By October, Donkey Kong was selling 4,000 units a month, and by June 1982, Nintendo had sold 60,000 Donkey Kong machines in the United States, earning $180 million. Judy and Stone, who worked on straight commission, became millionaires. Donkey Kong appealed to both sexes; How to Win Video Games (1982) estimated that half of its players were women, while 95% of Defender players were men. Arakawa used Nintendo's profits to buy 27 acres (11 ha) of land in Redmond in July 1982. Nintendo earned another $100 million on the game in its second year of release in America, totaling $280 million in US cabinet sales by 1982 (equivalent to $990,000,000 in 2025).

In Japan, the annual Game Machine charts listed Donkey Kong as the highest-grossing arcade game of 1981, then the sixth highest-grossing arcade game of 1982. Game Machine later listed the game as the 20th most successful table arcade cabinet of September 1983. In the United States, Donkey Kong topped the Play Meter arcade charts in October 1981, setting a weekly earnings record, and it was later listed by RePlay as the highest-grossing arcade game of 1982. It was also among the thirteen highest-grossing arcade games of 1983 in the United States. According to Electronic Games in June 1983, the home versions contributed to the arcade version's extended popularity, compared to the four to six months that the average game lasted. It remained Nintendo's top seller into mid-1983, with steady sales in Japan. A total of 65,000 arcade units were sold in Japan, and 67,000 arcade units in the United States, for a total of 132,000 arcade units sold in Japan and the United States.

Nintendo's Game & Watch handheld version of Donkey Kong released in 1982 sold 8 million units. Coleco had sold 6 million Donkey Kong cartridges for home consoles, grossing more than $153,000,000 (equivalent to $510,000,000 in 2025) (Note: "And we received from Coleco an agreement that they would pay us three percent of the net sales price [of all the Donkey Kong cartridges Coleco sold]". It turned out to be 6 million cartridges, which translated into $4.6 million.) and earning Nintendo more than $5 million in royalties; the bundled ColecoVision version sold 2 million units, while the Atari 2600 version sold 4 million units in 1982 for $100 million, making it one of the best-selling Atari 2600 games. It was also one of the earliest cartridges available for video game rental at certain stores in 1982. Atari's 1987 re-release for the Atari 2600 sold a further 180,523 units for $1,258,282 by 1990. Coleco's Mini-Arcade tabletop versions of Donkey Kong, along with Pac-Man, Galaxian, and Frogger, had combined sales of three million units. In Japan, 840,000 units of the Famicom version were sold; the Famicom Mini version for the Game Boy Advance later had a further 160,000 units sold, for a total of 1 million units sold in Japan. The Atari 8-bit computer version sold 25,502 units in 1986 and 1990. This totals 15,206,025 units sold worldwide for the Game & Watch, ColecoVision, Atari and Famicom ports. As of 2015, all versions of the original Donkey Kong are estimated to have grossed $4.4 billion in revenue.

== Legal issues ==
In April 1982, Sid Sheinberg, a lawyer and the president of MCA and Universal City Studios, learned of the game's success and suspected it might be a trademark infringement of the King Kong franchise. Nintendo was given 48 hours to turn over all profits from the game and dispose of all Donkey Kong inventory. On April 27, he met with Arnold Greenberg of Coleco and threatened to sue over the company's home version of Donkey Kong. On May 3, Coleco agreed to pay royalties to Universal of 3% of their Donkey Kong's net sale price, worth about $4.6 million. Meanwhile, Sheinberg revoked Tiger Electronics' license to produce its King Kong handheld electronic game, but O. R. Rissman refused to acknowledge Universal's claim to the trademark. When Universal threatened Nintendo, Howard Lincoln and Nintendo refused to cave. In preparation for the court battle, Universal agreed to allow Tiger to continue producing its King Kong game as long as they distinguished it from Donkey Kong.

Universal sued Nintendo on June 29 and announced its license with Coleco. The company sent cease and desist letters to Nintendo's licensees, all of which except for Milton Bradley and Ralston Purina agreed to pay royalties to Universal. Universal City Studios, Inc. v. Nintendo, Co., Ltd. was heard in the United States District Court for the Southern District of New York by Judge Robert W. Sweet. Over seven days, Universal's counsel, the New York firm Townley & Updike, argued that the names King Kong and Donkey Kong were easily confused and that the plot of the game was an infringement on that of the films. Nintendo's counsel, John Kirby, countered that Universal had argued in a previous case that King Kong's scenario and characters were in the public domain (by way of the novelization of the 1933 film). Sweet ruled in Nintendo's favor, awarding them Universal's profits from Tiger's game ($56,689.41), damages and attorney's fees.

Universal appealed, trying to prove consumer confusion by presenting the results of a telephone survey and examples from print media where people had allegedly assumed a connection between the two Kongs. On October 4, 1984, the court upheld the previous verdict. Nintendo and its licensees filed counterclaims against Universal. On May 20, 1985, Judge Sweet awarded Nintendo $1.8 million for legal fees, lost revenues, and other expenses, but denied Nintendo's claim of damages from those licensees who had paid royalties to both Nintendo and Universal. Both parties appealed this judgment, but the verdict was upheld on July 15, 1986.

Nintendo thanked John Kirby with the gift of a $30,000 sailboat named Donkey Kong and "exclusive worldwide rights to use the name for sailboats". Kirby, the protagonist of the Kirby series, was named in John Kirby's honor. The court battle also taught Nintendo they could compete with larger entertainment industry companies.

After the release of Donkey Kong Jr., the arcade successor to Donkey Kong, Ikegami sued Nintendo for the unauthorized duplication of the Donkey Kong program code. Nintendo managed to settle the dispute out of court after the two companies came to an agreement. At the time of the suit, computer programs were not considered copyrightable material. The Tokyo High Court gave a verdict in 1989 that acknowledged the originality of program code. Ikegami and Nintendo reached a settlement the following year; the terms of it were never disclosed.

== Legacy ==
In 1996 Next Generation listed the arcade, Atari 7800, and cancelled Coleco Adam versions as number 50 on their "Top 100 Games of All Time", commenting that even ignoring its massive historical significance, Donkey Kong stands as a great game due to its demanding challenges and graphics which manage to elegantly delineate an entire scenario on a single screen. In February 2006, Nintendo Power rated it the 148th best game made on a Nintendo system. In 2017, The Strong National Museum of Play inducted Donkey Kong to its World Video Game Hall of Fame. Today, Donkey Kong is the fifth most popular arcade game among collectors.

=== Impact ===
Donkey Kong spawned a number of other titles with a mix of running, jumping and vertical traversal, a novel genre that did not match the style of games that came before it. The genre was initially referred to as "Donkey Kong-type" or "Kong-style" games, the U.S. gaming press adopted the term "climbing games", and eventually the genre came to be known as platform games. The game was also a milestone in terms of video game storytelling and cutscenes. While there were earlier games that either told a story or used cutscenes, Donkey Kong combined both concepts together to introduce its own new concept: using cutscenes to visually advance a complete story. It also had multiple, distinct levels that progressed the storyline.

Donkey Kong was also one of the first Japanese games brought to Western regions that introduced a surreal concept using cute artwork, a representation of typical Japanese fantasy but unusual to Western audiences. For that reason, Donkey Kong and similar games that followed were briefly called "novelty games" by Western gaming press. Donkey Kong and other such games helped to acclimate Western audiences to Japanese approaches to game design, narrative, and abstraction that would become key elements in the decade that followed with the release of the NES.

Computer and Video Games called Donkey Kong "the most momentous" release of 1981, as it "introduced three important names" to the global video game industry: Nintendo, Shigeru Miyamoto, and Mario. These three figures went on to play a significant role in video game history. Donkey Kong paved the way for the NES, known as the Famicom in Japan. Following the success of Donkey Kong, Nintendo began developing the Famicom, the hardware of which was largely based on the Donkey Kong arcade hardware, with the goal of matching the system's powerful sprite capabilities in a home system. Nintendo wanted the Famicom to match the Donkey Kong arcade hardware, so they took a Donkey Kong arcade cabinet to semiconductor chip manufacturer Ricoh for analysis, which led to Ricoh producing the Picture Processing Unit (PPU) chip for the NES.

=== Competition ===
The 2007 documentary The King of Kong follows the efforts of Steve Wiebe and Billy Mitchell to break the world record for high scores in Donkey Kong. It sparked a resurgence of interest in competitive play, and there has been a string of record breaking Donkey Kong scores since the documentary was released.

=== Re-releases ===
The NES version was re-released as an unlockable game in the first Animal Crossing, both through its Nintendo Space World 2000 demo as well as the final game. It was also released on the Virtual Console for the Wii in 2006 worldwide with a South Korean release in 2008, the Wii U in 2013, and the Nintendo 3DS in Japan in 2012, North America and Europe in 2013, and in South Korea in 2016. The Wii U version is also the last game that was released to celebrate the 30-year anniversary of the Japanese version of the NES, the Famicom. The original arcade version of the game appears in the Nintendo 64 game Donkey Kong 64, and it must be beaten to finish the game. Nintendo released the NES version on the e-Reader in 2002, and for the Game Boy Advance as part of the Classic NES Series in 2004. In 2004, Namco released an arcade cabinet which contains Donkey Kong, Donkey Kong Jr., and Mario Bros. The original arcade version was re-released by Hamster Corporation as part of their Arcade Archives series for Nintendo Switch on June 14, 2018, and the NES version was re-released as one of the launch titles for the Nintendo Classics service on September 19.

Donkey Kong: Original Edition is an update of the NES version that reinstates the cement factory stage and includes some animations absent from the original NES version, and has only ever been released on the Virtual Console. It was preinstalled on 25th Anniversary PAL region red Wii systems, which were first released in Europe on October 29, 2010. In Japan, a download code for the game for the 3DS Virtual Console was sent to users who purchased New Super Mario Bros. 2 or Brain Age: Concentration Training from the Nintendo eShop from July 28 to September 2, 2012. In North America, a download code for Original Edition for the 3DS Virtual Console was sent to users who purchased one of five select 3DS games on the Nintendo eShop and registered it on Club Nintendo from October 1, 2012, to January 6, 2013. In Europe and Australia, it was released for purchase on the Nintendo 3DS eShop in September 2014.

=== Clones ===
Donkey Kong was widely influential and resulted in direct clones and games with similar elements and themes in the early 1980s. The Giant List of Classic Game Programmers lists 17 different Donkey Kong clones released for various home platforms. There were so many games with multiple ladder and platforms stages by 1983 that Electronic Games described Nintendo's own Popeye game as "yet another variation of a theme that's become all too familiar since the success of Donkey Kong". That year Sega released Congo Bongo in arcades, which puts the structure of Donkey Kong into an isometric perspective; coconuts rolled by an ape are Congo Bongo's analog of barrels. Coconuts—tossed by a monkey this time—are also the primary obstacles in the platform levels of Taito's Zoo Keeper from the same year.

Crazy Kong was officially licensed from Nintendo and manufactured by Falcon for some non-US markets. Nevertheless, Crazy Kong machines found their way into some American arcades, often installed in cabinets marked as Congorilla. Nintendo was quick to take legal action against those distributing the game in the US. Bootleg copies of Donkey Kong also appeared in both North America and France under the Crazy Kong, Konkey Kong or Donkey King names. The 1982 Logger arcade game from Century Electronics is a direct clone of Donkey Kong, with a large bird standing in for the ape and rolling logs instead of barrels.

In 1981, O. R. Rissman, president of Tiger Electronics, obtained a license to use the name King Kong from Universal City Studios. Under this title, Tiger created a handheld LCD game with a scenario and gameplay based directly on Nintendo's creation. Epyx's Jumpman (Atari 8-bit, 1983) reuses a prototypical name for the Mario character in Donkey Kong. A magazine ad for the game has the tagline "If you liked Donkey Kong, you'll love JUMPMAN!" Jumpman, Miner 2049er (Atari 8-bit, 1982), and Mr. Robot and His Robot Factory (Atari 8-bit, 1984), focus on traversing all of the platforms in the level, or collecting scattered objects, instead of climbing to the top.

Many home computer clones directly borrowed the gorilla theme: Killer Gorilla (BBC Micro, 1983), Killer Kong (ZX Spectrum, 1983), Crazy Kong 64 (Commodore 64, 1983), Kongo Kong (Commodore 64, 1983), Donkey King (TRS-80 Color Computer, 1983), and Kong (TI-99/4A, 1983). One of the first releases from Electronic Arts was Hard Hat Mack (Apple II, 1983), a three-stage game without an ape, but using the construction site setting from Donkey Kong. Other clones recast the game with different characters, such as Cannonball Blitz (Apple II, 1982), with a soldier and cannonballs replacing the ape and barrels, and the American Southwest-themed Canyon Climber (Atari 8-bit, 1982).

Nintendo attempted to take legal action against unauthorized clones of Donkey Kong, but estimated they lost $100,000,000 (equivalent to $354,000,000 in 2025) in potential sales to these clones. By 1990, Nintendo had successfully won over thirty lawsuits related to Donkey Kong. For example, Nintendo won a 1990 Japanese lawsuit against Falcon Company, which had sold 12,000 counterfeit arcade cabinets in the United States during the 1980s.

=== Franchise ===
Donkey Kong spawned a franchise, beginning with the sequel Donkey Kong Jr. (1982) with the player controlling Donkey Kong's son in an attempt to save his father from Mario. The spin-off Mario Bros. (1983) introduced Mario's brother Luigi in a single-screen cooperative game, set in a sewer, and launched the Mario franchise. The final arcade installment, Donkey Kong 3 (1983), appeared in the form of a fixed shooter, with an exterminator named Stanley ridding the ape—and insects—from a greenhouse.

Nintendo revived the franchise in the 1990s for a series of platform games and spin-offs developed by Rare, beginning with Donkey Kong Country in 1994. Donkey Kong Racing for the GameCube was in development by Rare, but was canceled when Microsoft purchased the company.

In 2004, Nintendo released the first of the Donkey Konga games, a rhythm-based game series that uses a special bongo controller. Donkey Kong Jungle Beat (2004) is a unique platform action game that uses the same bongo controller accessory. In 2007, Donkey Kong Barrel Blast was released for the Wii. It was originally developed as a GameCube game and would have used the bongo controller, but was delayed and released exclusively as a Wii game with no support for the bongo accessory. The Donkey Kong Country series was revived by Retro Studios in 2010 with the release of Donkey Kong Country Returns, and its sequel, Donkey Kong Country: Tropical Freeze, in 2014.

In 2004, Nintendo released Mario vs. Donkey Kong, a sequel to the Game Boy's Donkey Kong, in which Mario must chase Donkey Kong to get back the stolen Mini-Mario toys; Mario vs. Donkey Kong has since continued as its own series, which placed a larger emphasis on the toys in the subsequent installments. Pauline continued to only make appearances in the Mario vs. Donkey Kong series, but after her appearance in Super Mario Odyssey as the Mayor of New Donk City (a large urban area with several references to the original Donkey Kong game), she began to make further appearances in more Mario spinoffs such as Mario Kart and the Mario sports titles.

Over a decade after the release of Tropical Freeze, The Donkey Kong series returned with the release of Donkey Kong Bananza in 2025, the second 3D platformer in the series after Donkey Kong 64 in 1999. In the game, Donkey Kong ventures underground with a teenage Pauline. Throughout the game, there are several references to the original Donkey Kong arcade game, including a throwback stage that recreates the first level, and costumes for Pauline that pay tribute to her appearance in the original game and its flyer.

Donkey Kong appears as a game in the Wii U game NES Remix, which features multiple NES games and sometimes "remixes" them by presenting significantly modified versions of the games as challenges. One such challenge features Link from The Legend of Zelda traveling through the first screen to save Pauline. The difficulty is increased compared to the original Donkey Kong because Link cannot jump, as in Zelda. Super Smash Bros. Brawl and Super Smash Bros. for Wii U include a demo of the NES version of Donkey Kong. A stage called "75m", a replica of its Donkey Kong namesake, has appeared in the Smash series since Brawl. Mario Kart World features a race course called "DK Spaceport" themed after Donkey Kong, where racers drive on platforms and avoid large barrels thrown by a giant, robotic version of Donkey Kong.

=== In popular culture ===
By June 1982, Donkey Kong's success had prompted more than 50 parties in the U.S. and Japan to license the game's characters. Mario and Donkey Kong appeared on cereal boxes, board games, pajamas, and manga. Several animated commercials were produced by FilmFair Studio for the cereal, with Larry Moran as Mario, Jo Belle Yonely as Pauline, and William Marshall as the narrator. In 1983, the animation studio Ruby-Spears produced a Donkey Kong cartoon (as well as Donkey Kong Jr.) for the Saturday Supercade program on CBS. In the show, mystery crime-solving plots in the mode of Scooby-Doo are framed around the premise of Mario and Pauline chasing Donkey Kong (voiced by Soupy Sales), who has escaped from the circus. The show lasted two seasons.

The game's creation and lawsuit with Universal were discussed in the second episode of High Score on Netflix, which also includes an interview with John Kirby, who the episode was dedicated to as he died shortly before its release.

In the 2015 film Pixels, a film where aliens take on the form of 1980s arcade characters as they attack Earth, the alien leader takes on the form of Donkey Kong in the film's climax. In the 2023 Super Mario Bros. Movie, Charles Martinet—Mario's voice actor in the video games—makes a cameo appearance as Giuseppe, who resembles how Mario looked back in Donkey Kong. Giuseppe is also seen playing Donkey Kong on an arcade cabinet, but in the film the game is called "Jump Man", referencing Mario's original name.

In 1982, the songs "Do the Donkey Kong" by Buckner & Garcia and "Donkey Kong" by R. Cade and the Video Victims were released, while the Miami based song "Donkey Kong (Catch You In The Break)" by The Invisibles was released in 1984. Artists like DJ Jazzy Jeff & the Fresh Prince and Trace Adkins referenced the game in songs. Episodes of The Simpsons, Futurama, Crank Yankers, and The Fairly OddParents have referenced the game. Sound effects from the Atari 2600 version serve as generic video game sounds in films and television series. The phrase "It's on like Donkey Kong" was coined by American rapper Ice Cube in 1992, and has been used in various works of popular culture. In November 2010, Nintendo applied for a trademark on the phrase with the United States Patent and Trademark Office.

Fallout 4 includes a holotape game called Red Menace that is inspired by Donkey Kong's levels. The game can be found in Vault 111 and played on the player's Pip-Boy.

== See also ==
- List of platformers
- List of video games featuring Mario
- 1981 in video games
