= John Kirby (attorney) =

American attorney (1939–2019)

- Kirby c. 2010s
- Born: John Joseph Kirby Jr. October 22, 1939; Falls Church, Virginia, U.S.
- Died: October 2, 2019 (aged 79)
- Occupation: Attorney
- Known for: Defending Nintendo from Universal Pictures; Namesake of Kirby
- Spouse: Susan Cullman (m. 2004)
- Children: 3
- Relatives: Edgar M. Cullman (father-in-law)

John Joseph Kirby Jr. (October 22, 1939 – October 2, 2019) was an American attorney. He was most notable for his successful defense for Nintendo against Universal Studios over the copyrightability of the character Donkey Kong in 1984, from which Nintendo subsequently named the character Kirby to honor him.

== Early life and education ==
Kirby was born in Falls Church, Virginia on October 22, 1939, to John Joseph Kirby, a lawyer with the federal government for over 40 years, and Rose L. Mangan Kirby, a homemaker. He had two brothers, Peter Kirby and Michael Kirby, and two sisters, Lisa Greissing and Cecelia Wrasse.

Kirby graduated from Fordham University in 1961, serving as student body president and a Rhodes scholar, earning both a bachelors and a masters degree from Merton College at Oxford University. He also was a Fordham trustee and a trustee fellow. He subsequently earned his Juris Doctor from the University of Virginia School of Law in 1966.

== Career ==
During his younger days, Kirby worked at the United States Department of Justice as the special assistant to the head of the Civil Rights Division, John Doar, during the height of the civil rights movement in the 1960s. At the Department of Justice, where he first worked as a summer intern, he gathered voting records throughout the South that demonstrated evidence of widespread discrimination against African-Americans. His documentation of methods such as literacy tests specifically designed to exclude African-Americans from voting helped form the basis of the Voting Rights Act of 1965. While at the Civil Rights Division, he also found himself personally escorting African-American children into segregated schools, surrounded by federal marshals. Later, he was appointed Deputy Director to the President's Commission on Campus Unrest, founded in the aftermath of the killings of four students at Kent State University.

Kirby eventually left the Justice Department and entered private practice. He argued in front of the Supreme Court and served as the chairman of the historic Wall Street law firm Mudge Rose Guthrie Alexander & Ferdon. After Mudge Rose dissolved in 1995, he joined the international law firm Latham & Watkins LLP, where he would chair their New York Litigation Department until 2004 and serve as head of the New York office's Intellectual Property and Technology Practice Group until 2007. During his four-decade career, Kirby represented a number of notable corporations in legal disputes, among which the likes of PepsiCo., General Foods, and Warner-Lambert.

=== Universal City Studios v. Nintendo ===
Kirby's most well-known case was Universal City Studios, Inc. v. Nintendo Co., Ltd. (1984), which he handled while a partner at Mudge Rose. In this case, he defended Nintendo against litigation from Universal Studios in a dispute revolving around the video game Donkey Kong, which Universal claimed to be an unlicensed use of the titular character from their film King Kong. Kirby won the case, a landmark victory for Nintendo, by presenting evidence that Universal had previously won a legal battle against RKO that said the story and characters of King Kong were in the public domain; thus, Universal had no legal right to claim ownership of the characters and basic scenario (man rescuing a woman from a large ape) when the studio originally threatened legal action against Nintendo. For this defense, Kirby was considered to have "saved Nintendo" during its early growth into video games in the American market.

In thanks for aiding them, Nintendo gave Kirby a $30,000 sailboat, christened Donkey Kong, along with "exclusive worldwide rights to use the name for sailboats." Shigeru Miyamoto also stated that the name of the character Kirby (created by Masahiro Sakurai) was chosen in honor of Kirby. It is rumored that a copy of the game Kirby's Dream Land was eventually sent to Kirby, who was humored and flattered.

== Personal life ==
Kirby was married to Susan Cullman, daughter of Edgar M. Cullman. He had three children from a previous marriage and a stepdaughter.

Kirby died on October 2, 2019, due to complications from myelodysplastic syndrome, aged 79.
