= Donkey Kong (character) =

Video game character

- Donkey Kong and Mario character
- Art from the Donkey Kong 2026 Wall Calendar (2025) by Shigehisa Nakaue
- First game: Donkey Kong (1981)
- Created by: Shigeru Miyamoto
- Designed by: Shigeru Miyamoto; Kevin Bayliss
- Voiced by: See section

In-universe information
- Nickname: DK
- Species: Kong (gorilla based)
- Family: Kong family

Donkey Kong (Note: Japanese: ドンキーコング, Hepburn: Donkī Kongu; [doŋ.kiː koŋ.ɡɯ]) (DK) is a character created by the Japanese game designer Shigeru Miyamoto. A flagship character of the Japanese video game company Nintendo, he is the star of the Donkey Kong franchise and also appears in the Mario franchise. Donkey Kong is a large, powerful gorilla who leads the Kong family of simians. He is stubborn and buffoonish, and attacks using barrels. He wears a red necktie bearing his initials and is accompanied by supporting characters such as his sidekick Diddy Kong, rival Mario, and archenemy King K. Rool.

Donkey Kong debuted as the antagonist of Donkey Kong, a 1981 platform game. He has appeared in many video games, including the original Donkey Kong arcade games, the Donkey Kong Country series of platform games, Mario games such as Mario Kart and Mario Party, and the Super Smash Bros. series of crossover platform fighting games. The original game characterized Donkey Kong as Mario's rebellious pet; games since Country feature him as a player character protecting his stash of bananas. Some games include Cranky Kong, (Note: Japanese: クランキーコング, Hepburn: Kurankī Kongu) an alternative elderly incarnation who breaks the fourth wall. Donkey Kong has appeared in animation, comics, children's books, Super Nintendo World theme park attractions, and merchandise such as Lego construction toys.

Miyamoto designed the original Donkey Kong using Popeye characters, but when Nintendo was unable to obtain the license, he created Donkey Kong to replace Bluto. He designed him as a dumb, humorous antagonist, named donkey to convey stubborn and kong to imply gorilla, and drew inspiration from the fairy tale "Beauty and the Beast" and the 1933 film King Kong. For Donkey Kong Country (1994), the Rare developer Kevin Bayliss redesigned him as a 3D model; this design persisted until he was redesigned for Donkey Kong Bananza (2025). Donkey Kong has been voiced by Mark Betteridge, Grant Kirkhope, Takashi Nagasako, and Koji Takeda in games, and by Soupy Sales, Garry Chalk, Richard Yearwood, and Seth Rogen in animation.

Donkey Kong has been listed among the greatest video game characters. He is one of Nintendo's most enduring characters; the Donkey Kong franchise was Nintendo's first major international success, established it as a prominent force in the video game industry, and remains one of Nintendo's bestselling franchises. Donkey Kong has also been the subject of analysis regarding his similarities to King Kong (which sparked the 1983 Universal City Studios, Inc. v. Nintendo Co., Ltd. lawsuit), his gender role, and his transition from villain to hero.

== Character ==
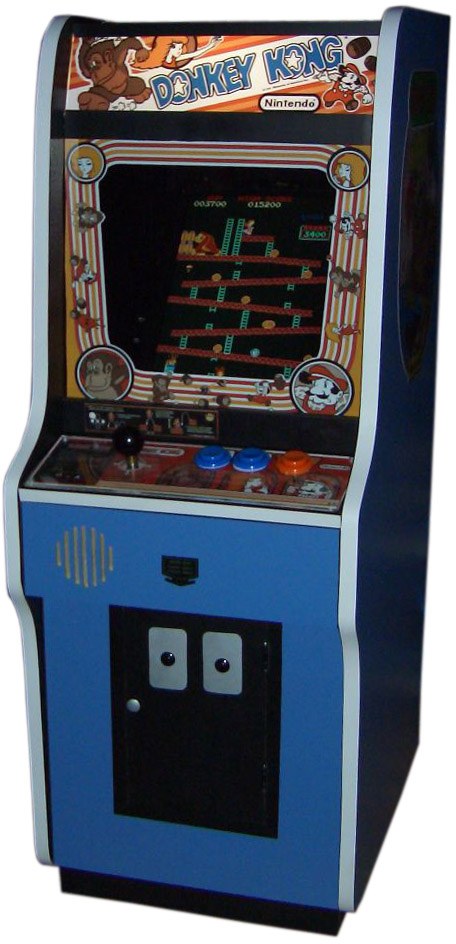
Donkey Kong debuted as the antagonist of the 1981 arcade game Donkey Kong.

Donkey Kong, also known by his initials DK, is the star of Donkey Kong, a video game series and media franchise owned by the Japanese video game company Nintendo. One of Nintendo's flagship characters, he also appears in the Mario franchise as a playable character in Mario Kart and Mario Party games. He is playable in the Super Smash Bros. series of crossover fighting games and makes cameos in other Nintendo franchises, such as Punch-Out!!.

In his debut as the antagonist of Donkey Kong, a 1981 arcade game, Donkey Kong is Mario's rebellious pet gorilla who kidnaps his girlfriend Pauline and climbs a construction site. He appears as Mario's captive in the sequel Donkey Kong Jr. (1982), in which he must be rescued by his son of that name, and returns as the antagonist in Donkey Kong 3 (1983) and Donkey Kong (1994). Beginning with Donkey Kong Country (1994), Donkey Kong games were developed by the British studio Rare until its acquisition by the Nintendo competitor Microsoft in 2002. He was recast as a protagonist starting with Country, though he occasionally appears as an antagonist, such as in Mario vs. Donkey Kong (2004).

Donkey Kong is a large and powerful gorilla who leads the Kongs, a family of simians. He resides in a city in early Donkey Kong games, but the Rare games moved his residence to Donkey Kong Island, an idyllic isle. Donkey Kong weighs 800 pounds (360 kg) in reference to a popular expression, and since 1994 has been depicted wearing a red necktie bearing his initials. Although Donkey Kong was introduced as an antagonist, he is not evil. Nintendo World Report's Pedro Hernandez wrote that, unlike the Mario villains Bowser and Wario, Donkey Kong's villainous acts are the result of jealous temper tantrums rather than malice. He is stubborn, buffoonish, and innocent. He strives to help others and be accepted. Donkey Kong is depicted as lazy and sleeping when he is not adventuring. He protects his stash of bananas from enemies such as the Kremlings, a crocodile army led by his archenemy King K. Rool, and the Tiki Tak Tribe, a group of floating masks. Donkey Kong is frequently accompanied by his nephew and sidekick Diddy Kong, and his girlfriend, Candy Kong.

In his playable appearances, Donkey Kong is a heavyweight. He throws barrels to impede the player's progress in the original game. This trait is retained in his playable appearances, whereby he uses barrels as weapons or to uncover power-ups. Donkey Kong's other tactics include slapping the ground, rolling, clinging onto and climbing surfaces, and swinging on vines. He rides vehicles such as minecarts and barrel-shaped rockets, and animals such as Rambi the Rhino and Enguarde the Swordfish. In Super Smash Bros., Donkey Kong has slow but powerful attacks such as a chargeable punch and a headbutt; IGN's staff liken him to Street Fighter's Zangief.

=== In other media ===
A Donkey Kong cartoon produced by Ruby-Spears aired as part of CBS's hour-long Saturday Supercade programming block in 1983. It follows Mario and Pauline as they attempt to capture Donkey Kong after he escapes from a circus. Donkey Kong appears in Captain N: The Game Master, a DIC Entertainment series that ran on NBC for 34 episodes between 1989 and 1991. He interacts with other Nintendo Entertainment System (NES) characters such as Castlevania's Simon Belmont. The animated Donkey Kong Country (1997–2000), a sitcom, follows Donkey Kong as he attempts to protect a magical artifact, the Crystal Coconut, from King K. Rool.

Donkey Kong is a major character in The Super Mario Bros. Movie (2023), an animated film produced by Nintendo, Illumination, and Universal Pictures. Mario and Princess Peach seek the Kongs' help to stop Bowser from invading the Mushroom Kingdom. The Kongs agree to help after Mario defeats Donkey Kong in an arena fight. Mario and Donkey Kong begin as foes, but learn they both want the respect of their fathers, and Donkey Kong participates in the final battle against Bowser. Donkey Kong makes a cameo in The Super Mario Galaxy Movie (2026), during a montage depicting Yoshi's life in Brooklyn.

Appearances in printed media include Blip, a short-lived American comic book published by Marvel Comics in 1983, a Donkey Kong Country comic published by the British comics publisher Fleetway Editions in 1995, and children's book adaptations of the Country games by Michael Teitelbaum. Donkey Kong appears on Nintendo merchandise, including clothing, toys such as plushes and Amiibo figures, and trading cards. The Lego Group introduced a Donkey Kong Lego figure in a series of Country Lego Super Mario sets in 2023. Donkey Kong also appears as a mascot in a Country-themed area at Universal Studios' Super Nintendo World, which opened in 2024.

=== Cranky Kong ===
The incarnation of Donkey Kong from the arcade games has appeared as a separate character, Cranky Kong, since Donkey Kong Country (1994). Artwork from Donkey Konga (2003).

Donkey Kong Country claims that "Donkey Kong" is a hereditary title and that the Donkey Kong introduced in the Rare games is separate from the arcade games. The original Donkey Kong appears as Cranky Kong, a grumpy, elderly gorilla with a beard and cane. Cranky was initially depicted as extremely thin, which later games toned down while also giving him a thicker beard and fur.

Cranky provides fourth wall-breaking humor that unfavorably compares the games to older ones such as the original Donkey Kong. For instance, Donkey Kong Country's instruction manual features commentary from Cranky denigrating the game, and Donkey Kong Land's (1995) metafictional story transpires due to Cranky's claim that Country was only successful because of pre-rendered graphics. His wife, Wrinkly Kong, was introduced in Donkey Kong Country 2 (1995) and is killed off as a joke in Donkey Kong 64 (1999), appearing in subsequent games as a ghost.

In most games, Cranky appears as a non-player character who provides hints or sells items. He is playable in Donkey Kong Country: Tropical Freeze (2014), in which he can use his cane to bounce on enemies and obstacles. Cranky also appears in spin-offs such as the Donkey Konga games and Donkey Kong Barrel Blast (2007), and a Rabbid incarnation appears in a Donkey Kong expansion pack for Ubisoft's Mario + Rabbids Kingdom Battle (2017). He is a supporting character in The Super Mario Bros. Movie, and an animatronic at Super Nintendo World. On February 20, 2014, to promote Tropical Freeze, Nintendo pretended to have Cranky take over its Twitter account, tweeting wisecracks and image macros.

The Rare Donkey Kong games referred to Cranky as both Donkey Kong's father and grandfather. Nintendo often referred to Cranky as Donkey Kong's grandfather after Rare's acquisition by Microsoft, but The Super Mario Bros. Movie identifies him as Donkey Kong's father. Video game journalists have noted that the inconsistency makes it unclear if the modern Donkey Kong is intended to be an adult Donkey Kong Jr., who does not appear in the Country games.

== Development ==
=== Conception ===
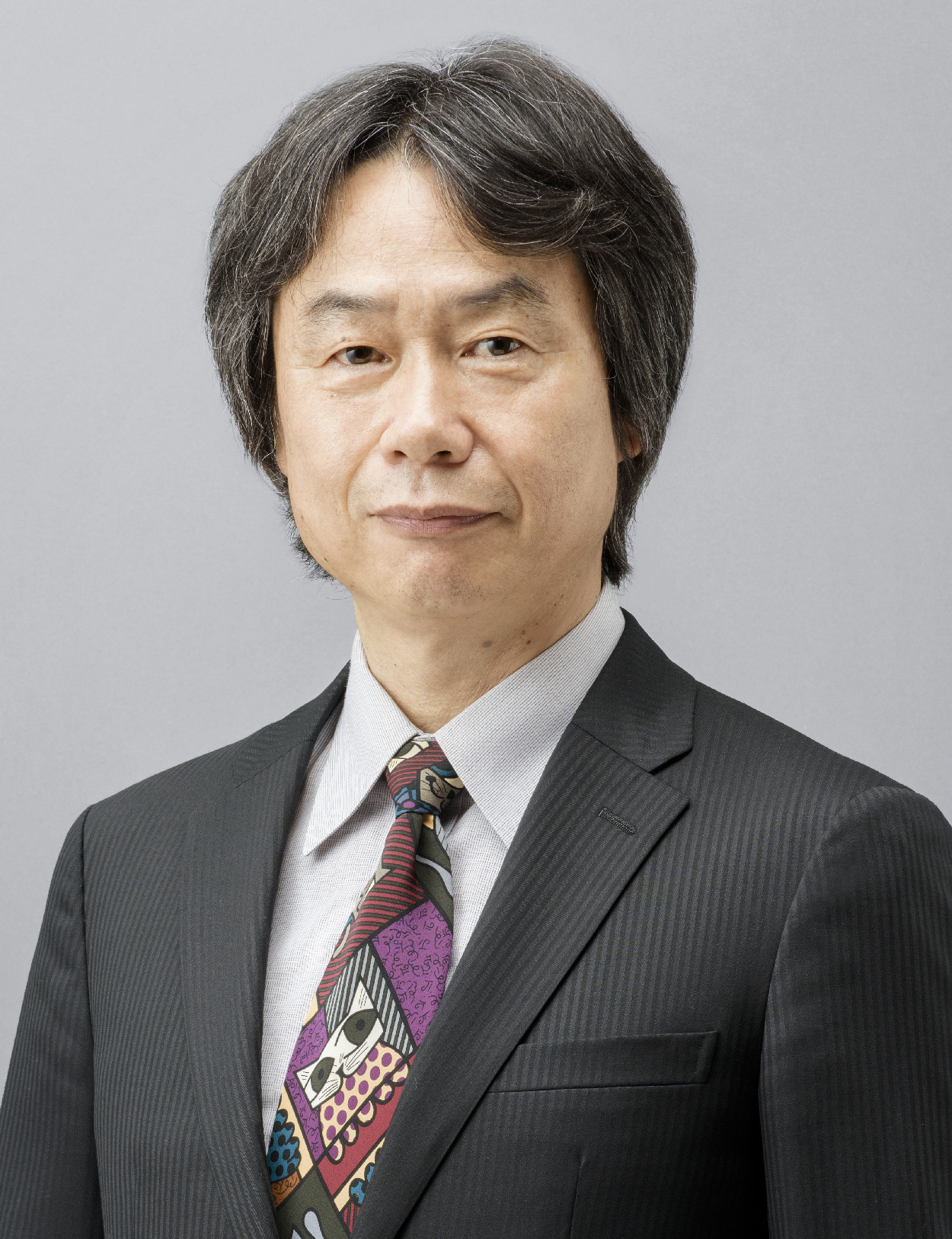
Donkey Kong's creator, Shigeru Miyamoto, in 2015

In 1980, the commercial failure of Nintendo's arcade game Radar Scope put the newly established subsidiary Nintendo of America in a financial crisis. Its founder, Minoru Arakawa, asked his father-in-law, the Nintendo CEO Hiroshi Yamauchi, to provide a game that could repurpose the unsold Radar Scope cabinets. Most of Nintendo's top developers were preoccupied, so the task went to Shigeru Miyamoto, a first-time game designer. Miyamoto found most arcade games of the time dull and wanted to make one that told a story, drawing from his favorite media such as the Shakespeare play Macbeth, the fairy tale "Beauty and the Beast", and the 1933 film King Kong.

Miyamoto devised a love triangle with the characters Popeye, Olive Oyl, and Bluto from the Popeye franchise, but a licensing deal between Nintendo and King Features fell through. Miyamoto created original characters to replace the Popeye ones; Mario and Pauline replaced Popeye and Olive Oyl, and Donkey Kong replaced Bluto. Like Bluto, Donkey Kong was a hairy, brutish character. Miyamoto chose a gorilla—an animal he found "nothing too evil or repulsive"—because he felt it made the scenario more interesting and humorous, and because gorillas are built similarly to humans. "Beauty and the Beast" and King Kong influenced the choice. Concept art that Miyamoto sent to Donkey Kong's programmers at Ikegami Tsushinki indicates that he replaced Bluto with Donkey Kong before removing the other Popeye characters.

=== Name ===
Nintendo considered around 20 names for the character before settling on Donkey Kong. It is a common misconception that "Donkey Kong" is a mistranslation of "Monkey Kong". Donkey was meant to convey stubborn, and Miyamoto believed kong was a generic term for gorilla. Miyamoto called him "King Kong" during development, as, in Japan, it was commonly used to refer to any large ape. One name, "Funky Kong", was later used for a separate character in Donkey Kong Country. Other names considered included "Kong Dong" and "Kong Holiday". Nintendo of America objected to the name "Donkey Kong" because it did not believe donkey could be used to describe an idiot, but Miyamoto liked how it sounded.

Miyamoto is generally credited with coining the name "Donkey Kong", a narrative supported by the David Sheff book Game Over (1993) and interviews with Miyamoto in 2000 and 2016. Conversely, documents from the 1983 Universal City Studios, Inc. v. Nintendo Co., Ltd. lawsuit credit a Nintendo export manager, Shinichi Todori. The documents indicate that Miyamoto's supervisor Gunpei Yokoi asked Todori to title Donkey Kong, and Todori selected donkey after looking for an English equivalent to the Japanese word tonma (とんま) ("fool"). Either Yokoi or Yamauchi approved the name; Todori did not recall Miyamoto having any involvement.

=== Appearances ===
Donkey Kong has appeared in dozens of games. Donkey Kong's popularity quickly led to the production of a sequel, Donkey Kong Jr. Miyamoto, interested in showing the narrative from Donkey Kong's perspective, wanted to make him the player character, but the sprite graphic was too big to easily maneuver, so he created Donkey Kong Jr. The developers made Donkey Kong Mario's captive so they could still feature him at the top of the screen.

After Donkey Kong 3, Donkey Kong's appearances were limited to cameos in unrelated games. Several games featuring Donkey Kong were canceled, including a Sega-developed arcade game, the NES game Return of Donkey Kong, and a Riedel Software Productions-developed CD-i game. Nintendo staff began discussing a Donkey Kong revival as the original game's tenth anniversary approached in 1991. They were unable to start a new game at the time, so they included Donkey Kong Jr. as a playable character in Super Mario Kart (1992). However, the discussions led to the development of the Game Boy Donkey Kong game, released in 1994.

The Game Boy game marked Donkey Kong's first major appearance in over 10 years, before he first appeared as a protagonist in the Super Nintendo Entertainment System game Donkey Kong Country. Though he was not playable in the sequels Donkey Kong Country 2 and Donkey Kong Country 3 (1996), GamesRadar+'s Henry Gilbert wrote that the Country series nonetheless re-established Donkey Kong as one of Nintendo's major characters. During the Nintendo 64 era, Nintendo incorporated Rare's Donkey Kong in Mario Kart 64 (1997), in the party game Mario Party (1998), and in the crossover game Super Smash Bros. (1999). Donkey Kong was a late addition to Mario Kart 64, replacing Kamek from prerelease versions.

Following Microsoft's acquisition of Rare, Donkey Kong mostly appeared as a guest character in other Nintendo franchises, such as Mario Kart, Mario Party, and Super Smash Bros.; the Donkey Kong franchise was mostly limited to spin-offs such as Donkey Konga and Mario vs. Donkey Kong. Donkey Kong did not have another major starring role after Rare's Donkey Kong 64 until Donkey Kong Jungle Beat (2004). After appearing as the final boss of the Wii game Punch-Out!! (2009), Retro Studios briefly revived the Country series with Donkey Kong Country Returns (2010) and Donkey Kong Country: Tropical Freeze. Activision's toys-to-life game Skylanders: SuperChargers (2015) includes Donkey Kong as a playable character in the versions released on Nintendo platforms, and Mario + Rabbids Kingdom Battle features him as the protagonist of an expansion pack.

Tropical Freeze, released for the Wii U in 2014, was the last game starring Donkey Kong for over a decade. Plans for a Nintendo Switch game developed by the Activision developer Vicarious Visions were canceled in 2016. Nintendo began working to reestablish Donkey Kong as a major character in the 2020s, with his prominent role in The Super Mario Bros. Movie and Super Nintendo World's Country area. Donkey Kong Bananza (2025) ended the post-Tropical Freeze hiatus.

=== Design ===
Miyamoto designed Donkey Kong to appear dumb, as he saw him as humorous rather than evil. He described Donkey Kong as a trickster; in his mind, Donkey Kong's motivation was not to hurt Pauline, but to retaliate against Mario, who mistreated him. With the exception of Donkey Kong 3, Donkey Kong's character artwork during the 1980s generally portrayed him as likable, even as a villain. The Game Boy game was the first to depict Donkey Kong wearing a red tie with his initials. For Donkey Kong Country, Rare's Kevin Bayliss redesigned Donkey Kong. Bayliss was asked only to make him look more modern; he had no problems with the existing design, but was nonetheless excited to reinterpret him.

From left to right, the evolution of Donkey Kong's design: the original arcade-era design (1981–1994), Rare's Country redesign (1994–2025), and Nintendo's redesign (2025–present)

Alongside the red tie from the Game Boy game, Bayliss gave Donkey Kong what GamesRadar+'s Bob Mackey described as "menacing, sunken eyes and [a] beak-like muzzle". Bayliss wanted a character that looked believable and could perform animations such as pounding his chest. His initial design was blocky and muscular to make Donkey Kong easy to animate, but became more cartoonish when Nintendo faxed reference material. Bayliss recycled the eye design from those of the Battletoads, characters he had previously designed for Rare. In retrospect, Bayliss felt this made it difficult for Donkey Kong to express emotions besides annoyance.

Miyamoto provided some suggestions, but otherwise left the specifics to Bayliss. Donkey Kong Country marked Donkey Kong's first appearance as a 3D model, and the limitations of technology at the time influenced the redesign. Miyamoto asked that Donkey Kong have eyebrows and tangible fur, but both were infeasible. For the eyebrows, Rare compromised by making the area around Donkey Kong's eyes black. Miyamoto suggested the tie to better convey Donkey Kong's stubbornness. He felt Rare "breathed new life into" Donkey Kong and made him "really cool", but also childish. Because real gorillas move slowly, Rare based Donkey Kong's running animation on a horse's gallop. Steve Mayles rendered Donkey Kong's finalized 3D model in mid-1993.

Nintendo used the Bayliss design for decades in both Donkey Kong and Mario games. Paon reintroduced elements of the arcade-era design for Donkey Kong's appearance in DK: King of Swing (2004), but they were not retained in subsequent games, including King of Swing's sequel Donkey Kong: Jungle Climber (2007). Miyamoto said Nintendo began working to make Donkey Kong more expressive during Jungle Beat's development. Nintendo EPD redesigned Donkey Kong for the Nintendo Switch 2 game Donkey Kong Bananza, although the design first appeared in The Super Mario Bros. Movie and Mario Kart World (2025). It combines elements of the Bayliss design with the original arcade design, with larger eyes, a less angular brow, and lighter fur. EPD wanted to merge the expressiveness of Miyamoto's original design and his more cool and adventurous Country depiction, aiming to remain true to Miyamoto's vision and account for how different generations of fans saw Donkey Kong. Nintendo began updating merchandise and artwork to reflect the redesign in January 2025.

=== Voice ===
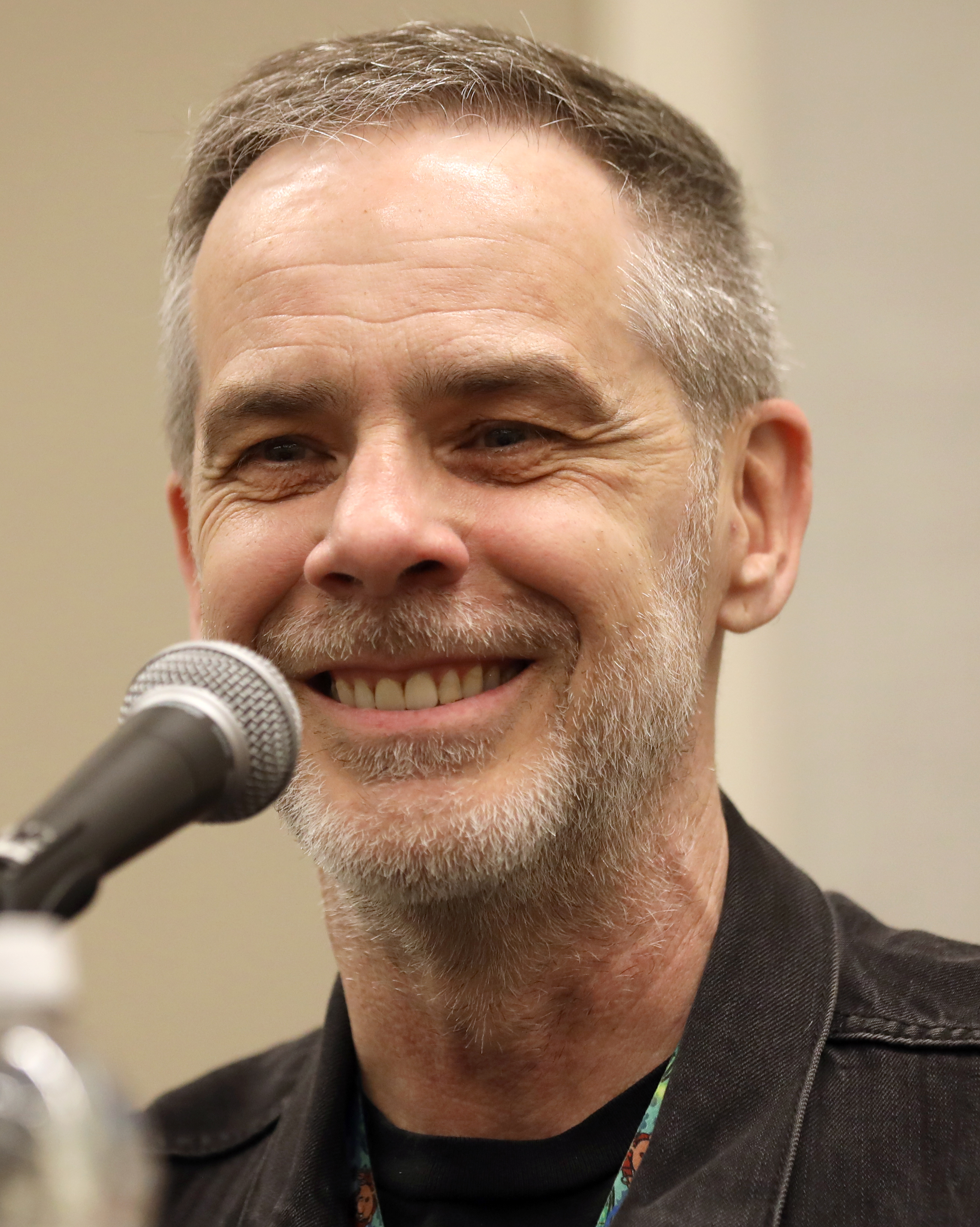
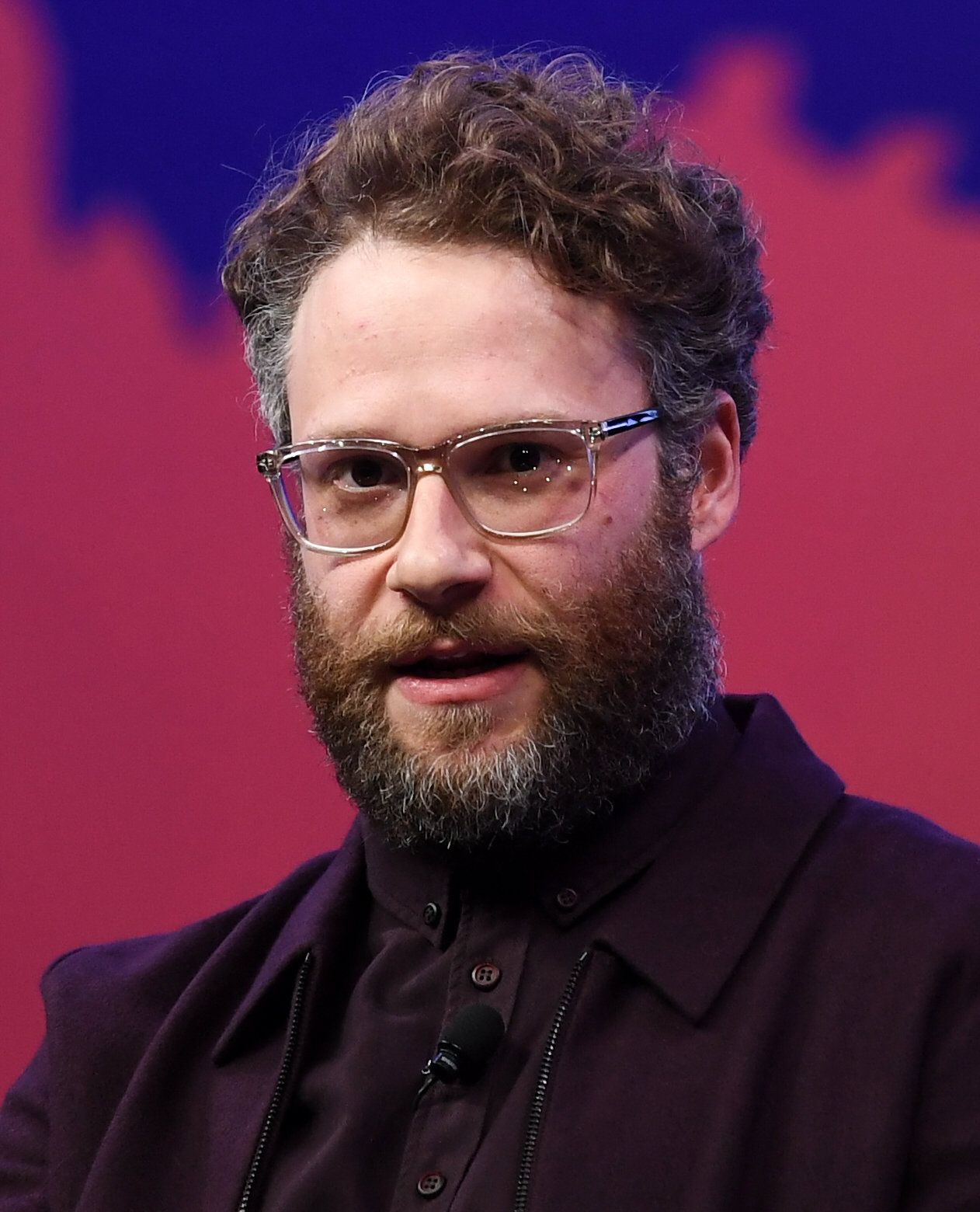
Grant Kirkhope (left) voiced Donkey Kong in many games, starting with Donkey Kong 64 (1999), while Seth Rogen (right) voiced him in The Super Mario Bros. Movie (2023).

Donkey Kong does not have a consistent voice across games, and generally makes gorilla noises instead of speaking in full sentences. Charles Martinet, who voiced Mario and other Mario characters until 2023, also voiced Donkey Kong for the 1994 "Mario in Real Time" trade show attraction. When developing Donkey Kong Country, Rare planned to use real gorilla noises and visited Twycross Zoo near the company's headquarters to record them. The composer David Wise described the visit as "a complete waste of time". Outside of feeding times, the gorillas were too quiet, so a Rare staffer, Mark Betteridge, provided Donkey Kong's voice. Grant Kirkhope voiced Donkey Kong while composing music for Donkey Kong 64; his voice appeared in games such as Mario Kart: Double Dash (2003), the Game Boy Advance port of Donkey Kong Country, and Mario vs. Donkey Kong. Takashi Nagasako, the most prolific Donkey Kong voice actor, voiced him in 37 games from Mario Power Tennis (2004) to Donkey Kong Country Returns HD (2025). In 2025, Koji Takeda, who voiced Donkey Kong in the Japanese dub of The Super Mario Bros. Movie, assumed the role from Mario Kart World onward.

In his early animated appearances, Donkey Kong was voiced by the comedian Soupy Sales and the actor Garry Chalk. Richard Yearwood voiced Donkey Kong in the Donkey Kong Country animated series, and Sterling Jarvis performed his singing voice. Yearwood reprised the role for a fan-made short film in 2023. The actor and comedian Seth Rogen voiced Donkey Kong in The Super Mario Bros. Movie. Rogen, a fan of Donkey Kong since childhood, used his regular speaking voice, as he felt the role did not require an unusual one. He said that, during casting, "I was very clear that I don't do voices. If you want me to be in this movie, then it's going to sound like me and that's it... I think in the film and in the game, all you seem to know about Donkey Kong is that he throws barrels and does not like Mario very much. And that's what I ran with." The directors gave Rogen freedom to approach the role, and most of his directions were to yell and sound angry. Rogen enjoyed the role and expressed interest in reprising it.

== Reception and legacy ==
Donkey Kong is one of the most iconic video game characters, and has been listed as one of the greatest. The original Donkey Kong was Nintendo's first major international success and established it as a prominent force in the video game industry; IGN attributed its success to the popularity of Donkey Kong as a character. Donkey Kong featured a level of narrative depth unprecedented in games at the time, and gave Nintendo its first marketable characters. Donkey Kong was more popular than the protagonist, Mario, and he was the overwhelming focus of merchandise. Nintendo soon began to push Mario as a leading character, and Donkey Kong's popularity faded.

Game Informer's Ben Reeves wrote that Donkey Kong Country reestablished Donkey Kong's independent identity, and USgamer's Jeremy Parish said that it "brought back [Donkey Kong] in true '90s style". It positioned him as a competitor to Sega's Sonic the Hedgehog and other "hip anthromorph" platformer mascots, and was credited with helping Nintendo pull ahead of Sega towards the end of the 16-bit era's console war. GamePro's Lawrence Neves praised Donkey Kong's design for its details, such as his tie moving while he runs, and Total!'s reviewers said the quality of his animations surpassed that of a Disney Animation film. Critics enjoyed Donkey Kong's gameplay dynamic with Diddy Kong. Total!'s reviewers considered Donkey Kong more fun to control, although Hardcore Gaming 101's David DiRienzo found their control differences mostly superficial.

Nintendo World Report's Pedro Hernandez said the first two Country games cemented Donkey Kong as one of his favorite Nintendo characters. He found Donkey Kong endearing for his "innocence and humanity" in his attempts to help and feel accepted, and fascinating due to his in-universe history and expansive family. Country's critical standing declined in the 2000s, journalists deeming its emphasis on visual fidelity over gameplay innovation an example of style over substance. GameSpy's staff disliked the Country Donkey Kong redesign, which they felt was inferior to the unruly yet endearing arcade design, and expressed dismay that Nintendo retained it. GamesRadar+'s Bob Mackey said the design looked fine when considering the limitations of 1994 rendering technology but expressed surprise that Nintendo continued to use it without major alterations. He wrote that by 2014, it had become "increasingly bizarre to see this product of mid-90s technology dropped into games with real-time visuals that handily outclass Rare's pre-rendered relics".

After Rare's departure from the franchise, Donkey Kong's standing declined. Paste's Garrett Martin wrote that his popularity peaked in the early 1980s and mid-1990s, and only Donkey Kong Country Returns came close to matching the sales of the arcade and SNES games. IGN's Jesse Schedeen said that, by 2009, Donkey Kong was only kept relevant by his Super Smash Bros. appearances, as his name had become "almost synonymous with gimmicky games" like Donkey Konga. Schedeen called him one of the most overrated video game characters, and Vice's Ian Dransfield said that games starring Donkey Kong were outclassed by those starring Mario and Rayman.

GamesRadar+'s Scott McCrae said being a Donkey Kong fan was difficult due to the hiatuses between major games, and TheGamer's Adam Starkey said that Donkey Kong had "unfairly remained in Mario's shadow" in the decades following Rare's departure. IGN's Logan Plant wrote that before Donkey Kong Bananza's announcement it seemed as if Nintendo did not care about Donkey Kong. Starkey noted that his 40th anniversary in 2021 passed without acknowledgement from Nintendo, which he joked was "grounds for a HR complaint". He felt one could not celebrate Mario without acknowledging Donkey Kong and found it odd that Bowser had usurped Donkey Kong's role as Mario's nemesis, given the characters' history. Journalists expressed excitement for Donkey Kong's return in Donkey Kong Bananza, and Polygon felt its emphasis on destruction was a natural fit for his character.

Donkey Kong's 2025 redesign was divisive. After it was teased alongside Mario Kart World, TheGamer's Stanley Henley complained that it turned him into a generic "ugly inflatable", reflecting a trend for "aesthetic simplicity over visual flavor" in brands. McCrae described it as "peak Donkey Kong... He's got the goofy look, but still has the ability to look super intense". Bayliss considered the new design superior and said design changes were necessary for characters to endure. He felt there was nothing to debate and that fans should embrace change.

Regarding Donkey Kong's appearance in The Super Mario Bros. Movie, Game Informer's Brian Shea considered Rogen a perfect fit for Donkey Kong, and Mashable's Kristy Puchko said he brought "earnest glee" in his performance. Others felt Rogen's use of his regular speaking voice was lazy. Kotaku's Sisi Jiang called Rogen's explanation for not using a unique voice baffling, as he "seem[ed] to be arguing for a flattening of his own character, rather than building his own creative spin on it". Some critics considered Donkey Kong underused, which they tied to broader criticism that the story was underdeveloped.

=== Analysis ===
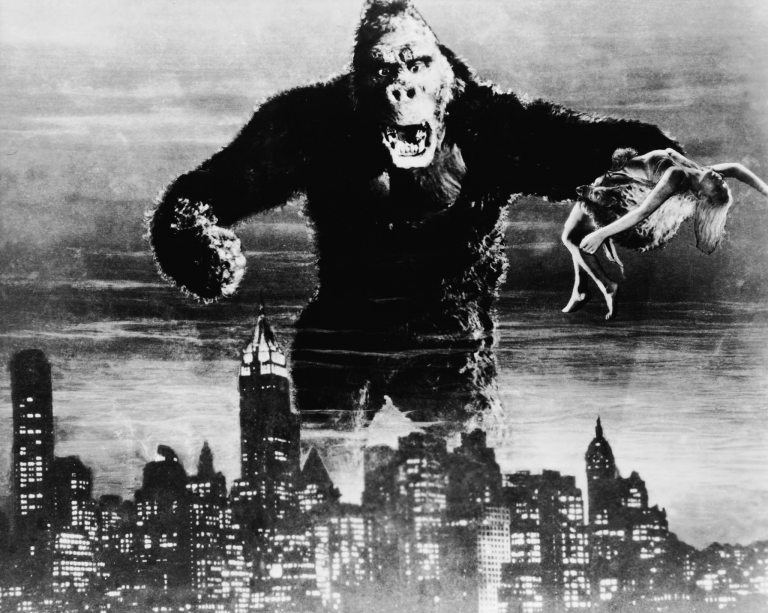
Donkey Kong has been described as a parody of King Kong; their similarities sparked the 1983 Universal v. Nintendo lawsuit.

Donkey Kong has been described as a parody of King Kong, with Hernandez writing that the original game "was almost a mockery of the premise" of the first King Kong film. Whereas King Kong is fearsome, Donkey Kong is silly and foolish. In the Universal City Studios, Inc. v. Nintendo Co., Ltd. lawsuit, Universal alleged that Donkey Kong violated its King Kong trademark. The judge Robert W. Sweet ruled it was unlikely that anyone would confuse the two, as Donkey Kong was "farcical, childlike and nonsexual" compared to King Kong, "a ferocious gorilla in quest of a beautiful woman". He noted stark contrasts between King Kong, who goes on bloody rampages and viciously attacks foes, and Donkey Kong, who bounces and struts to taunt the player and uses humorous obstacles such as cement tubs and pies.

The original Donkey Kong features a simple damsel in distress narrative with traditional gender roles, which Miyamoto reused in his Super Mario and Legend of Zelda games. Donkey Kong, hypermasculine and brutish, kidnaps the passive Pauline, who must be rescued by the "appropriately masculine" hero, Mario. However, due to the cyclical gameplay, the masculine Mario is unsuccessful in defeating the hypermasculine Donkey Kong, who always recaptures Pauline. The Western New England University professor Edward Wesp found this makes Donkey Kong similar to the Looney Tunes character Road Runner, and Mario akin to the perpetually failing Wile E. Coyote. Wesp writes that Mario's "determination and skill... will, in the end, fail to overcome [Donkey Kong]'s brutish power".

Games featuring Donkey Kong as a protagonist depict melodramatic adventures that emphasize action over characterization. According to PopMatters's Erik Kersting, in his initial appearance, Donkey Kong is similar to Nintendo villains such as Mario's Bowser, Zelda's Ganon, and Metroid's Ridley, in that he is animalistic, unclothed, and unrelatable, much like the literary villains Caliban and Gollum. Kersting observed that, in turning Donkey Kong into a protagonist, Donkey Kong Country "domesticated" him, adding the tie to clothe him and supporting Kongs to provide a family. The tie—as well as Donkey Kong's contrast with the crocodilian King K. Rool, a more primitive animal—suggests Donkey Kong possesses sophistication and nobility and does not merely act upon impulse. The Kong family highlights that Donkey Kong cares for others and is past kidnapping. The player thus perceives him as selfless and admirable.

Donkey Kong has been described as inheriting the racial stereotypes associated with the King Kong narrative, specifically using ape imagery to symbolize black men as brutes obsessed with white women. There is no evidence that Miyamoto or Nintendo executives intentionally drew from racial stereotypes when creating Donkey Kong, but the researcher Sam Srauy argued that Donkey Kong "played into pre‐existing racial beliefs in the United States and further set the video game industry on a path dependency toward reifying racism". Srauy wrote that Donkey Kong continued to embody racist tropes after becoming a protagonist, finding his post-Country laziness evocative of the "porch monkey" stereotype.

=== In popular culture ===
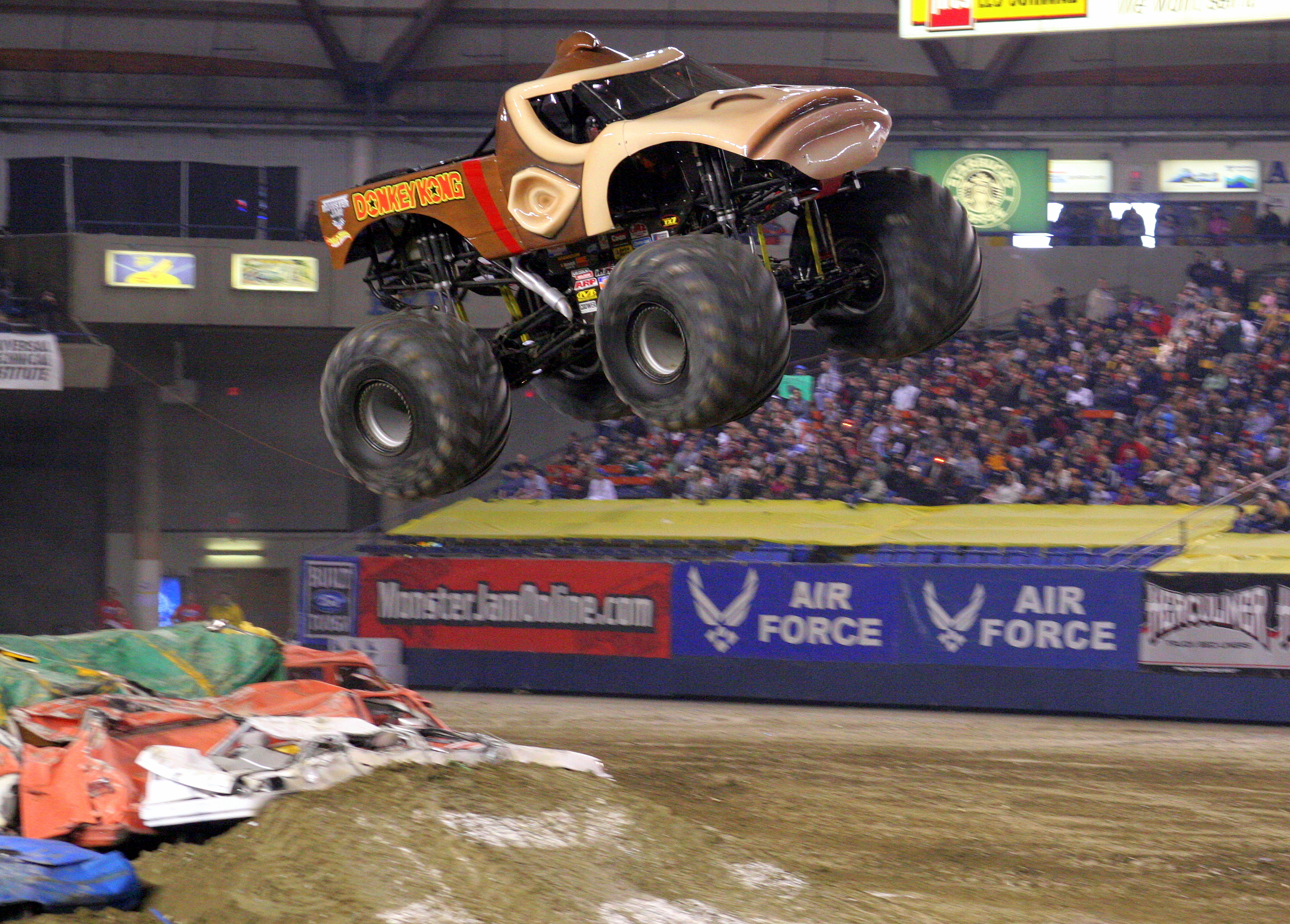
A Donkey Kong-themed monster truck at Monster Jam in 2008

Donkey Kong remains one of Nintendo's bestselling franchises, with 82 million copies sold by 2025. Journalists described Donkey Kong as a mascot for both Nintendo and the video game industry. (Note: Attributed to multiple references: Eurogamer, GamesRadar+, IGN, and Wired) The catchphrase "it's on like Donkey Kong" has entered pop culture vernacular, used in television series, films, music, and news headlines to say something is "going down". In 2007, the Monster Jam racing series obtained the license to use Donkey Kong's appearance for a monster truck. The truck debuted in a December 2007 show in Minneapolis and toured with Monster Jam throughout 2008.

Ralph, the protagonist of the video game-themed Walt Disney Animation Studios film Wreck-It Ralph (2012), was inspired by Donkey Kong. He is introduced as the antagonist of a Donkey Kong-like arcade game and has similar proportions. Entertainment Weekly described him as "a kind of human version of Donkey Kong". The director, Rich Moore, said Ralph was conceived as an animal similar to Donkey Kong, and the animators used Donkey Kong as a reference when designing 8-bit sprites of Ralph.

Donkey Kong appears in Patrick Jean's Pixels (2010), a short film which depicts 1980s video game characters attacking New York City. He reappears in the feature film adaptation Pixels (2015), which expands the premise to depict alien invaders using the characters to conquer Earth. The director, Chris Columbus, said Donkey Kong's inclusion required months of negotiations, and Nintendo granted permission after determining the filmmakers were treating him with respect. The film War for the Planet of the Apes (2017) features treacherous apes nicknamed "donkeys" in reference to Donkey Kong.

Donkey Kong has inspired internet memes, including a 2022 phenomenon in which Twitter users responded to posts from the Pringles account by spamming a picture of Donkey Kong appearing to shoot lightning from his groin. The transgender rights movement adopted Donkey Kong as an icon after the YouTuber Harry "Hbomberguy" Brewis livestreamed a playthrough of Donkey Kong 64 for over 50 hours to raise funds for the British charity Mermaids in 2019, in response to the National Lottery Community Fund considering canceling a £500,000 grant. Kirkhope made a guest appearance during the stream to say "trans rights" in his Donkey Kong voice. Laura Kate Dale, a transgender game journalist, wrote for the BBC that posting images of Donkey Kong became "a powerful act of protest and a way to remind one man that his attempt to remove financial support from the trans community failed" following the livestream.
