= Coleco =

American manufacturer of consumer electronics

Coleco Industries, Inc.

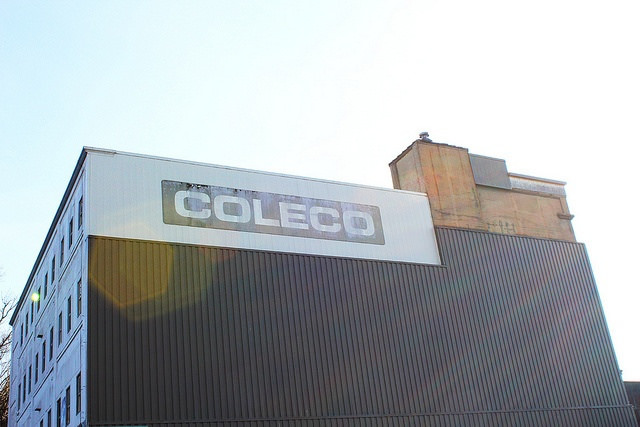
- The abandoned Coleco building in Amsterdam, New York
- Formerly: The Connecticut Leather Company
- Industry: Entertainment; Video game
- Founded: 1932; 94 years ago
- Founder: Maurice Greenberg
- Defunct: 1988; 38 years ago
- Fate: Closed, properties sold
- Headquarters: West Hartford, Connecticut, U.S.
- Key people: Leonard Greenberg; Arnold Greenberg
- Products: Leather goods; Toys; Above ground swimming pools; Video games; Consumer electronics
- Brands: Coleco ADAM; Coleco Gemini; Coleco Telstar; ColecoVision; Cabbage Patch Kids; Sectaurs

Coleco Industries, Inc. (/kəˈliːkoʊ/ kə-LEE-koh) was an American company founded in 1932 by Maurice Greenberg as The Connecticut Leather Company. The name "COLECO" is an abbreviation derived from the company's original name. It was a successful toy company in the 1980s, mass-producing versions of Cabbage Patch Kids dolls and its video game consoles, the Coleco Telstar dedicated consoles and ColecoVision. While the company ceased operations in 1988 as a result of bankruptcy, the Coleco brand was revived in 2005, and remains active to this day.

== Overview ==
=== 1932: origins as The Connecticut Leather Company ===
Coleco Industries, Inc. began in 1932 as The Connecticut Leather Company. The business supplied leather and "shoe findings" (the supplies and paraphernalia of a shoe repair shop) to shoe repairers. In 1938, the company began selling rubber footwear. During World War II demand for the company's supplies increased and by the end of the war, the company was larger and had expanded into new and used shoe machinery, hat cleaning equipment and marble shoeshine stands.

=== 1950s: leather diversification ===
By the early 1950s, and thanks to Maurice Greenberg's son, Leonard Greenberg, the company had diversified further and was making leather lacing and leathercraft kits. In 1954, at the New York Toy Fair, their leather moccasin kit was selected as a Child Guidance Prestige Toy, and Connecticut Leather Company decided to commit to the toy business. In 1956, Leonard read about the emerging technology of vacuum-formed plastic; the company adopted this and it became increasingly successful, producing a wide variety of plastic toys and wading pools.

=== 1961: Coleco Industries, Inc. ===
In 1961, the leather and shoe findings portion of the business was sold, and Connecticut Leather Company became Coleco Industries, Inc, An abbreviation of "Connecticut Leather Company". On January 9, 1962, Coleco went public, offering 120,000 shares of stock at $5.00 a share.

=== 1960s: acquisitions ===
In 1963, the company acquired the Kestral Corporation of Springfield, Massachusetts, a manufacturer of inflatable vinyl pools and toys. This led to Coleco becoming the largest manufacturer of above-ground swimming pools in the world.

In 1966, Leonard persuaded his brother Arnold Greenberg to join the company. Further acquisitions included Playtime Products (1966) and Eagle Toys of Canada (1968). By the end of the 1960s, Coleco operated ten manufacturing facilities and occupied a new corporate headquarters in Hartford, Connecticut.

=== 1970s: financial difficulties and further diversification ===
Coleco experienced financial difficulty during the 1970s, even though sales had grown to $48.6 million in 1971. In 1972, Coleco entered the snowmobile market through acquisition. Lower than expected snowfall that year and market conditions led to very reduced sales and poor profits.

Dozens of companies rushed to introduce game systems after the release of Atari's successful Pong console and the company entered the video game console business with the Telstar. Nearly all of the new game systems were based on General Instrument's AY-3-8500 integrated circuit. General Instrument had underestimated demand, resulting in severe shortages. However, Coleco was one of the first to place an order and therefore one of the few companies to receive the full order. Though dedicated game consoles did not last long on the market, their early order enabled Coleco to break even.

=== Late 1970s: handheld electronic games ===
Coleco continued to perform well in electronics. The company transitioned into handheld electronic games, a market popularized by Mattel. An early success was Electronic Quarterback. Coleco produced two popular lines of games, the "head to head" series of two player sports games (Football, Baseball, Basketball, Soccer, Hockey, Boxing) and the Mini-Arcade series of licensed video arcade titles such as Donkey Kong and Ms. Pac-Man. A third line of educational handhelds was also produced and included the Electronic Learning Machine, Lil Genius, Digits, and a trivia game called Quiz Wiz. Launched in 1982, their first four tabletop Mini-Arcades, for Pac-Man, Galaxian, Donkey Kong, and Frogger, sold approximately three million units within a year. Among these, 1.5 million units were sold for Pac-Man alone. In 1983, it released three more Mini-Arcades: Ms. Pac-Man, Donkey Kong Junior, and Zaxxon.

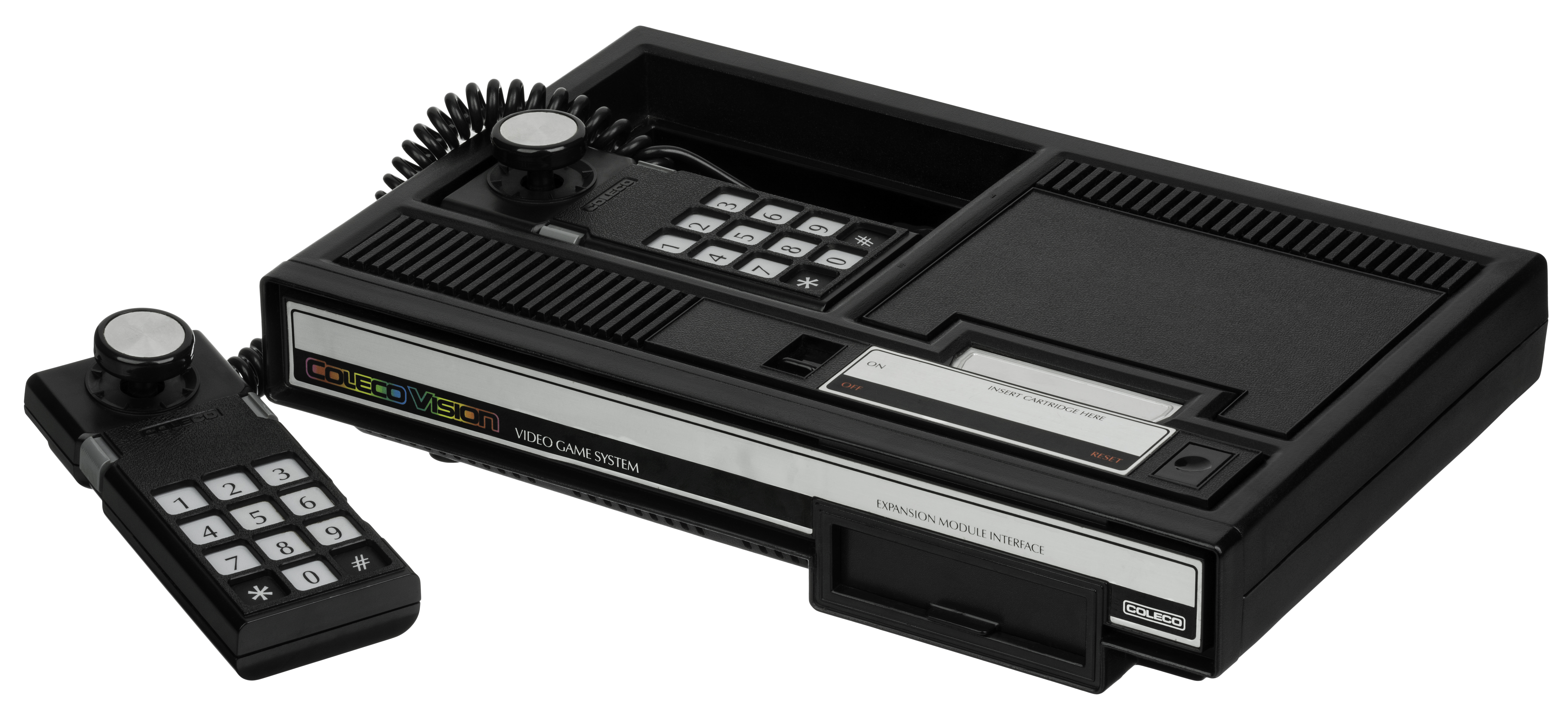
The ColecoVision video game console

Coleco returned to the video game console market in 1982 with the launch of the ColecoVision. The system was quite popular and more powerful than the Atari 2600, and came bundled with a copy of Donkey Kong. The console sold 560,000 units in 1982. Coleco also hedged its bet on video games by introducing a line of ROM cartridges for the Atari 2600 and Intellivision, selling six million cartridges for both systems, along with two million sold for the ColecoVision for a total of eight million cartridges sold in 1982. It also introduced the Coleco Gemini, a clone of the popular Atari 2600, which came bundled with a copy of Donkey Kong. Video games helped Coleco sales to almost triple in 1982 to $500 million, from $178 million the previous year.

When the video game business began to implode in 1983, it seemed clear that video game consoles were being supplanted by home computers. Bob Greenberg, son of Leonard Greenberg and nephew of Arnold Greenberg, left Microsoft where he had been working as a program developer at the time to assist in Coleco's entry into this market. Coleco's strategy was to introduce the Coleco Adam home computer, both as a stand-alone system and as an expansion module to the ColecoVision. The effort failed, in part because Adams were often unreliable due to being released with critical bugs, and in part because the computer's release coincided with the home computer industry crashing. Coleco withdrew from electronics early in 1985.

=== 1983: Cabbage Patch Kids ===
In 1983, Coleco released the Cabbage Patch Kids series of dolls which were wildly successful. In the same year, Dr. Seuss signed a deal with Coleco to design a line of toys, including home video games based on his characters. Flush with success, Coleco purchased Leisure Dynamics (manufacturer of the board games Aggravation and Perfection) and beleaguered Selchow and Righter, manufacturers of Scrabble, Parcheesi, and Trivial Pursuit, in 1986. Sales of Selchow & Righter games had plummeted, leaving them with warehouses full of unsold games. The purchase price for Selchow & Righter was $75 million. That same year, Coleco introduced an ALF plush, based on the furry alien character who had his own television series at the time, as well as a talking version and a cassette-playing "Storytelling ALF" doll.

=== 1988: bankruptcy and sale ===
The combination of the purchase of Selchow & Righter, the disastrous Adam computer, and the public's waning infatuation with Cabbage Patch Dolls all contributed to Coleco's financial decline. In 1988, the company filed for Chapter 11 bankruptcy.

The reorganized Coleco sold off all of its North American assets and outsourced thousands of jobs to foreign countries, closing plants in Amsterdam, New York and other cities.

In 1988, Canada-based SLM Action Sports Inc. purchased Coleco's swimming pool and snow goods divisions.

In 1989, Hasbro purchased most of Coleco's remaining product lines.

== Brand ==
Coleco as a brand name has been owned by several entities since it was created in 1961 by Coleco Industries, Inc.

In 2005, River West Brands, now Dormitus Brands, a Chicago-based brand revitalization company, re-introduced the Coleco brand to the marketplace. In late 2006, the company introduced the Coleco Sonic, a handheld system containing twenty Master System and Game Gear games, including two from the Sonic the Hedgehog series. In 2014, River West Brands established the subsidiary Coleco Holdings for their Coleco-branded projects.

In December 2015, Coleco Holdings announced the development of the Coleco Chameleon, a new cartridge-based video game system; in actuality, a re-branding of the controversial Retro VGS console, whose Indiegogo campaign failed to secure funding when it ended in early November 2015, with only $63,546 raised of its $1.95 million goal. In the press release, it was established that the system would be able to play new and classic games in the 8, 16, and 32-bit styles. The release for the system was announced to be sometime in early 2016, with a demonstration at Toy Fair New York in February. However, some critics suggested that the prototype fell short of its developmental goals and was nothing more than the motherboard of a Super NES model SNS-101 inside an Atari Jaguar case. Later mock images of a prototype posted by AtariAge showed the device utilizing a CCTV capture card in place of a motherboard. After Retro VGS failed to produce a fully working prototype, Coleco Holdings pulled out of involvement with Retro VGS, terminating the project.

== See also ==
- Sectaurs
- Starcom: The U.S. Space Force
