= Pixels (2010 film) =

- Directed by: Patrick Jean
- Written by: Patrick Jean
- Produced by: Johnny Alves; Benjamin Dara
- Cinematography: Matias Boucard
- Production company: One More Production
- Release date: 8 April 2010
- Running time: 2 minutes
- Country: France

Pixels is a 2010 French animated short film written and directed by Patrick Jean. It is about an invasion of New York City by classic 8-bit video game characters, such as those from Space Invaders, Pac-Man and others.

The film won "the Annecy Cristal" (le Cristal d'Annecy) for Best Short Film at the 2011 Annecy International Animated Film Festival.. The short would later be adapted into a feature length film, released in 2015.

== Plot ==
On a Brooklyn sidewalk, a man walks over to a trash can, leaves a 1980s-era television by it and walks away. After a few seconds, the television suddenly reactivates and an 8-bit picture of a bomb appears. When its fuse runs out, the television's screen shatters and releases a cloud of pixels (illustrated as voxels because of the three-dimensionality of the scene). They fly over to Manhattan and form into various characters from arcade video games throughout the 1980s.

Space Invaders start to shoot downwards; on contact, the projectiles cause a delivery truck and a pair of taxis to degenerate into pixels. A cloud of pixels then flies down a subway station, eventually forming into Pac-Man, which devours trains and other stations as it travels through the tunnels. Its progress is shown on the subway status display, similar to the cleared-away dots on the original game screen. Giant recreations of tetrominoes from Tetris then fall from the sky and match up with floors of skyscrapers. One building gets a "Tetris", eliminating several mid-level floors as its top crashes onto the remainder of the building. Recreations of the Vaus from Arkanoid appear and destroy one of the piers of the Brooklyn Bridge, resulting in the structure collapsing. Donkey Kong then throws a barrel from the Empire State Building which knocks down a traffic light and damaging a fire hydrant, the latter of which suddenly sprays out pixelated water, while Frogger is seen trying to cross traffic in the form of pixelated cars.

Finally, a giant pixelated bomb is shown. When it explodes, everything around it becomes pixelated. The effect envelops the entire cityscape and eventually the whole of the Earth, transfiguring it into a single giant pixel, which continues rotating as it drifts away. The end credits are shown as a high score list.

== Feature film adaptation ==
Columbia Pictures and Happy Madison Productions developed a film based on this short, in which the attacking video games behave as an alien invasion rather than a natural disaster. Tim Herlihy and Tim Dowling wrote the script, which Chris Columbus directed. Adam Sandler, Kevin James, Josh Gad, Peter Dinklage, Brian Cox, Ashley Benson and Michelle Monaghan star in the film.

The feature film shot principal photography in Toronto, Canada in June 2014 using downtown streets decorated to resemble Washington DC. It was released on July 24, 2015.

== See also ==
- "Anthology of Interest II", a 2002 episode from the TV series Futurama
