= Space Invaders =

1978 video game

- Japanese arcade flyer
- Developer: Taito
- Publishers: JP/AS/EU: Taito; NA/EU: Midway Manufacturing; AU: Leisure & Allied Industries
- Designer: Tomohiro Nishikado
- Composer: Michiyuki Kamei
- Series: Space Invaders
- Platform: Arcade: Atari 2600, Atari 8-bit, Atari 5200, MSX, Commodore 64, handheld, watch, calculator, Famicom, SG-1000, WonderSwan, VG Pocket, mobile phone, iOS
- Release: July 1978: Arcade; JP: July 1978; NA: November 1978 2600; March 10, 1980 Atari 8-bit; 1980 5200; October 1982 Famicom; JP: April 17, 1985 SG-1000; JP: June 1985 WonderSwan; JP: May 13, 1999 iOS; WW: February 27, 2009
- Genre: Fixed shooter
- Modes: Single-player, multiplayer

Space Invaders (Note: Japanese: スペースインベーダー, Hepburn: Supēsu Inbēdā) is a 1978 fixed shooter video game developed and published by Taito for arcades. Taito released it in Japan in July 1978 and overseas through a partnership with Midway Manufacturing later that year. Space Invaders was the first video game with endless gameplay and the first fixed shooter, setting the template for the genre. The goal is to defeat waves of descending aliens with a horizontally moving laser cannon to earn as many points as possible.

Designer Tomohiro Nishikado drew inspiration from video games such as Gun Fight and Breakout, electro-mechanical target shooting games, and science fiction narratives such as the novel The War of the Worlds, the anime Space Battleship Yamato, and the film Star Wars. To complete development, he had to design custom hardware and development tools to use the features in microprocessor technology, which was new to him. Upon release, Space Invaders quickly became a commercial success worldwide; by 1982, it had grossed $3.8 billion ($11 billion in 2025-adjusted terms), with a net profit of $450 million ($1.3 billion in 2025 terms). This made it the best-selling video game and highest-grossing entertainment product at the time, and the highest-grossing video game yet. It is also one of the highest-grossing media franchises of all time.

Space Invaders is considered among the most influential and best video games, having ushered in the golden age of arcade video games, as well as Japan's long-lasting success in the video games industry. It inspired several notable game designers to join the industry and has influenced numerous games. The game has been ported to several platforms, including the 1980 Atari 2600 version. The port to the Atari 2600 quadrupled the console's sales and became the first killer app for video game consoles. The pixelated aliens have become pop culture icons. The game has spawned many sequels and remakes, inspired numerous pieces of art and music, been parodied across media, and been the focus of several pieces of legislation to limit access to video games.

== Gameplay ==
The player-controlled laser cannon (bottom center) shoots the aliens (center) as they descend. Game statistics, like the current score and remaining lives, are tracked above and below the playing field.

Space Invaders is a fixed shooter in which the player moves a laser cannon, referred to as a "Laser Base", horizontally across the bottom of the screen and fires at a group of the titular alien invaders overhead. The invaders begin as five rows of eleven—the amount differs in some versions—that move left and right as a group, advancing on the shooter by shifting downward each time they reach a screen edge. The goal is to eliminate all the invaders by shooting them. Regardless of how many game lives the player has remaining, the game ends if the aliens reach the bottom of the screen.

The aliens attempt to destroy the player's cannon by firing projectiles, which costs the player a game life if successful. The game ends after all lives are depleted. The laser cannon is partially protected by stationary defense bunkers that are gradually destroyed from above by the invaders; the bottom will be destroyed if the player fires when beneath one. As the invaders are defeated, their movement, as well as the accompanying music, speeds up. Defeating all the aliens brings another wave that starts lower, a loop that can continue endlessly. A special "mystery ship" will occasionally move across the top of the screen and award bonus points if destroyed.

== Development ==
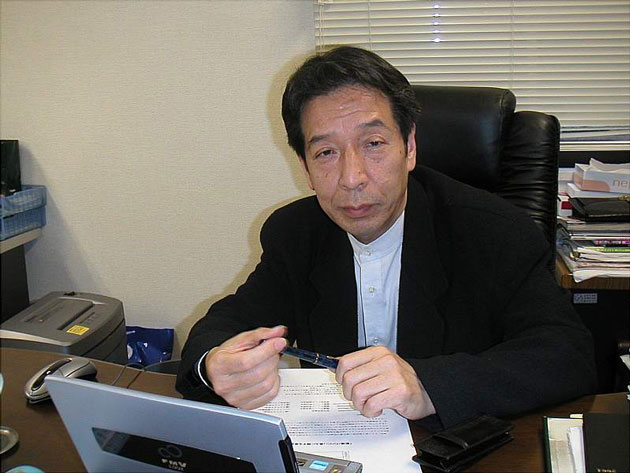
Tomohiro Nishikado (shown in 2011) designed Space Invaders' gameplay as well as the arcade cabinet's custom computing hardware.

Space Invaders was developed by Japanese designer Tomohiro Nishikado, who spent a year designing it and developing the necessary hardware to produce it. Because he worked alone and handmade many of the development tools, the process incurred minimal costs. Taito originally did not credit a designer as anonymity was a required part of Nishikado's contract with the company.

The game was a response to Atari, Inc.'s 1976 arcade game Breakout. Nishikado noted that Breakout-style games were very popular in Japan in 1977. He was a fan of the game and aimed to create something better. The developer wanted to adapt the same sense of achievement and tension from destroying targets one at a time, combining it with elements of target shooting games. The game uses a similar layout to that of Breakout but with different game mechanics; rather than bounce a ball to attack static objects, players are given the ability to fire projectiles at moving enemies.

To improve the design, Nishikado felt the targets should have an interesting shape. Early enemy designs included tanks, combat planes, and battleships. Nishikado was not satisfied with the enemy movements; technical limitations made it difficult to animate flying. The designer believed animating human characters would have been easier to program, but he considered shooting them immoral. Nishikado also said that shooting people was frowned upon. After seeing the release of the 1974 anime Space Battleship Yamato in Japan, and seeing a magazine feature about the 1977 Star Wars, he thought of using a space theme. Nishikado drew inspiration for the aliens from the novel The War of the Worlds and created initial bitmap images after the octopus-like aliens. Other alien designs were modeled after squids and crabs. After creating the pixel art, Nishikado created a tool to animate two frames of movement for each character and adjusted the design on-screen with a light pen. He added the bunkers and the mystery ship to the playing field afterward.

Nishikado added several interactive elements that he found lacking in earlier video games, such as enemies reacting to the player's movement and returning fire, and a game over triggered by the enemies killing the player character rather than simply a timer running out. He replaced the timer, typical of arcade games at the time, with descending aliens who effectively served a similar function, where the closer they came, the less time remained for the player. During the process, Nishikado wanted the game's difficulty to increase the longer the game progressed; he reasoned this kept the gameplay fresh and that the game would earn less if players could play for extended periods. He relied on feedback from his coworkers to balance the difficulty; in retrospect, Nishikado stated that without their input he would have made the game less challenging because he struggled to play it. The game was originally titled Space Monsters after a popular song in Japan at the time, "Monster", but was changed to Space Invaders by the designer's superiors.

=== Hardware ===
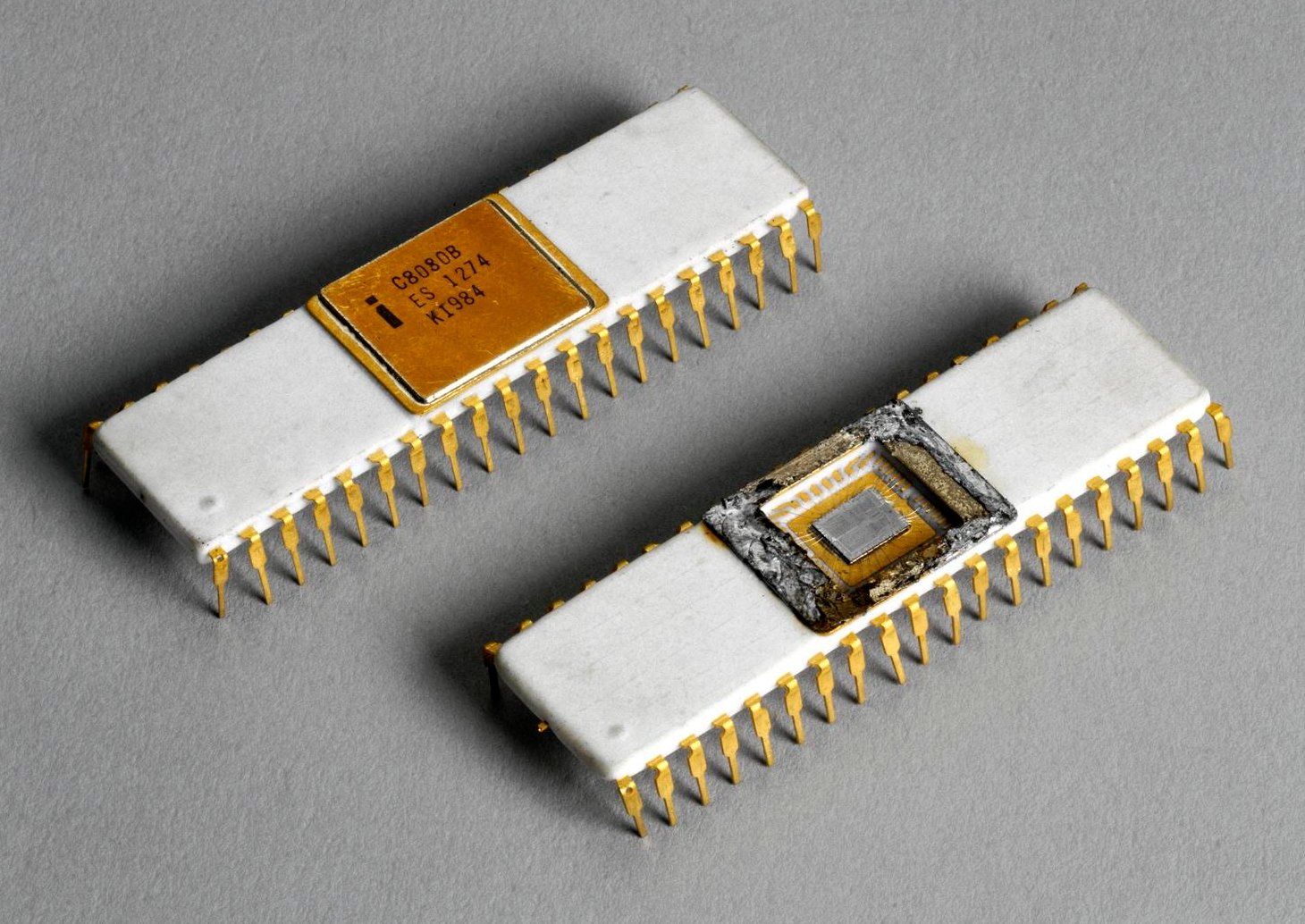
Nishikado adopted the Intel 8080 microprocessor (pictured) into development in order to display improved graphics and animation.

Nishikado designed his own custom hardware and development tools for Space Invaders. The game uses an Intel 8080 central processing unit (CPU) and displays raster graphics on a CRT monitor using a bitmapped framebuffer. The game outputs monaural sound hosted by a combination of analog circuitry and a Texas Instruments SN76477 sound chip.

The adoption of a microprocessor was inspired by the 1975 arcade game Gun Fight, Midway's microprocessor adaptation of Nishikado's earlier discrete logic game Western Gun, after the designer was impressed by the improved graphics and smoother animation of Midway's version. At the time, Taito had licensed Midway's technology to use in its games. Nishikado used Midway's arcade board as a motherboard and created additional boards and circuitry to expand the capabilities.

As microprocessors were manufactured in the United States, Nishikado had to rely on his English skills, which he described as limited, to translate the reference material. He dedicated about six months to studying American games and mastering using a microcomputer. While planning the game, Nishikado made iterative improvements to the hardware. He attributes his previous experience working with integrated circuits and learning assembly language during his university studies with helping him learn how to interact with the new hardware.

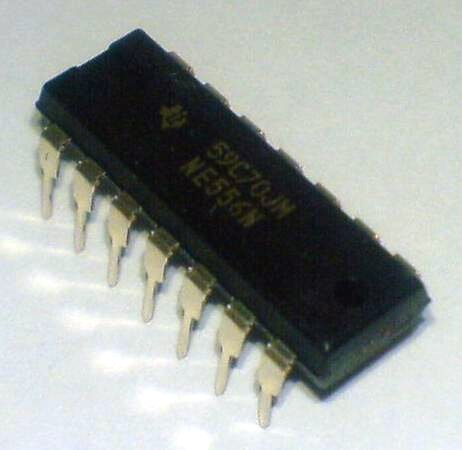
Michiyuki Kamei used the 556 timer IC (pictured), which he used previously in Super Speed Race, to generate the sound of the invaders' movement.

To add audio, Nishikado worked with Michiyuki Kamei, who created sound effects for Taito's games. Kamei spent four to five months on the audio circuitry for Space Invaders while also working on another game, Blue Shark. As management had prioritized Blue Shark, his work on Space Invaders was hurried in order to have both games ready for an unveiling event in the summer of 1978. Kamei decided to reuse parts and designs from other Taito games to meet the deadline. He replaced resistors and capacitors to adjust the pitch and duration of sound effects he created for Blue Shark. To create the invaders' moving sound effect, Kamei reused the 556 timer integrated circuit from Super Speed Race. Kamei felt the first invader sound effects were too comical and changed it after seeing the monster on the cabinet artwork and receiving feedback from Nishikado. Aiming to emulate the Jaws shark theme, he added resistors to the circuit in order to lower the effect's pitch. Texas Instruments had recently provided Taito free samples of the SN76477 sound chip, which Kamei inspected. Despite the higher cost, he chose it to produce the mystery ship's sound effects because the smaller chip saved space on the board.

Despite the specially developed hardware, Nishikado was unable to program the game as he wanted—the Control Program board was not powerful enough to display the graphics in color or move the enemies faster—and considered the development of the hardware the most difficult part of the process. While programming, Nishikado discovered that the processor was able to render each frame of the alien's animation graphics faster when there were fewer aliens on the screen. Since the alien's positions updated after each frame, this caused the aliens to move across the screen at an increasing speed as more were destroyed; the accompanying audio sped up as well. Rather than design a compensation for the speed increase, he decided to keep this undocumented feature as a gameplay mechanism. In retrospect, Nishikado noted that this aspect made the game more interesting and compensated for the hardware's limitations.

The cabinet artwork features large humanoid monsters absent from the game, which Nishikado attributed to the artist basing the designs on the original Space Monsters title rather than referring to the in-game graphics. In the upright cabinets, the graphics are generated on a hidden CRT monitor and reflected toward the player using a semi-transparent mirror, behind which is mounted a plastic cutout of a moon bolted against a painted starry background. The backdrop is visible through the mirror and thus appears "behind" the graphics. Both Taito's and Midway's first Space Invaders releases have black-and-white graphics with strips of transparent orange and green cellophane over certain portions of the screen to add color to the image. Later Japanese releases feature a rainbow-colored cellophane overlay; later versions had a color monitor and an electronically generated color overlay.

== Release ==
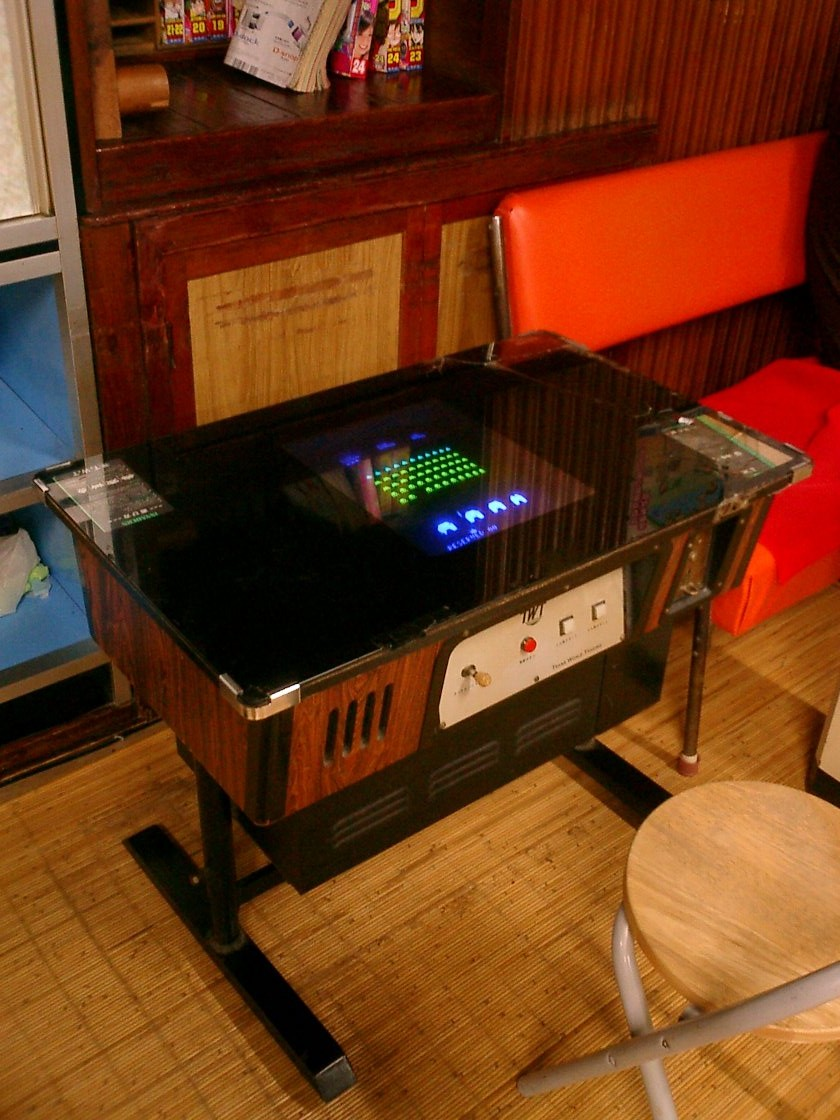
Cocktail table arcade cabinet

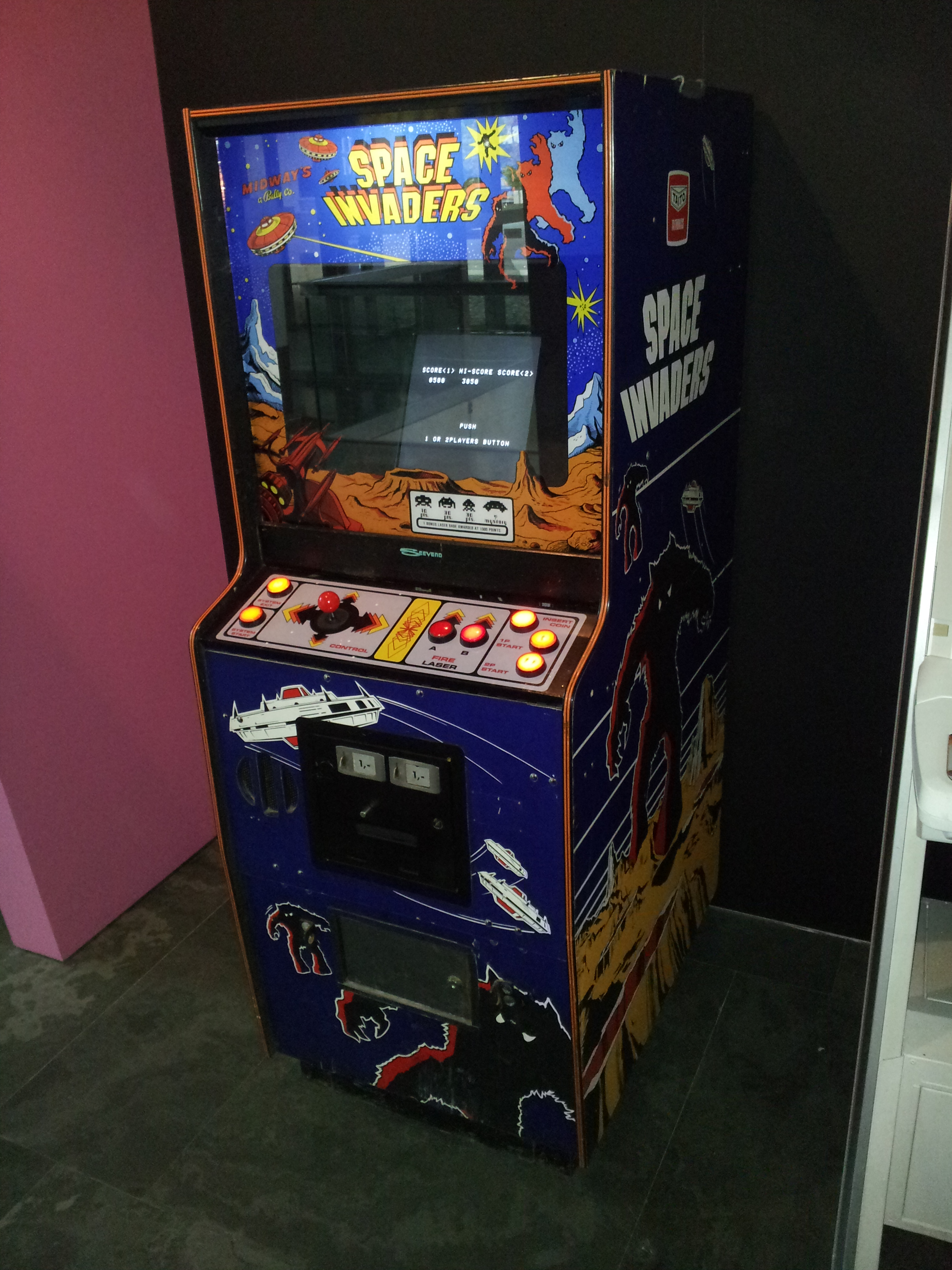
Modified upright arcade cabinet (Note: The cabinet pictured has been retrofitted with extra, illuminated buttons, an LCD monitor, and artwork from Midway Manufacturing's North American iteration of the game. The background effect has also been removed.)

Taito released Space Invaders in several types of arcade cabinets, some of which have since become collector's items.

Taito first officially published Space Invaders for purposes of copyright in April 1978. The company unveiled the game to businesses in June 1978. The focus of the event was Blue Shark, which Taito management believed would be more successful, and Space Invaders was included later during the event planning. By July 1978, the company began mass-producing the game and had released it. Taito first released an upright arcade cabinet, which it announced in August 1978. The next month, the company released a cocktail-table cabinet version, which was named T.T. Space Invaders in Japan to indicate it was a "table-top" version. Taito then submitted a trademark request for the game's name with the Japan Patent Office on September 18, 1978.

Soon after release, the developers became aware of a bug with the coin mechanism. Since only a few hundred units had been released at the time, Taito was able to apply a fix by replacing the machines' read-only memory (ROM). Taito also received requests to repair the game's audio, which Kamei discovered resulted from the loudspeaker's paper diaphragm breaking from usage. The company replaced the diaphragms in existing machines with a more durable version and included the upgrade in future arcade cabinets. A gameplay bug was discovered that prevented the invaders' attacks from harming the laser cannon at very close range. Although a programming fix was possible, Taito's management decided against a second ROM replacement; by then, the game's wide-spread popularity made it cost prohibitive. Players eventually adopted the bug as a strategy and named it "Nagoya shooting" (Note: 名古屋撃ち, Nagoya uchi) and "Wall of Death".

The company had installed over 100,000 machines in Japan by the end of the year. To cope with the demand, Taito licensed the overseas rights to Midway for distribution outside of Japan near the end of 1978. Midway released upright and cocktail versions. By December 1978, Taito had to import Midway cabinets into Japan to meet the country's demand. It added Japanese instruction cards to the cabinets and referred to them as Space Invaders M. The company also released a color version of T.T. Space Invaders that same month. Success prompted Taito to invest in manufacturing and expand globally, leading the company to found a subsidiary, Taito America, in the United States in 1979. Taito then filed a trademark request for its arcade game with the United States Patent and Trademark Office on December 10, 1979. The company produced 200,000–300,000 units for the Japanese market by June 1979 and increased production to 25,000–30,000 units per month with Taito projecting to manufacture 400,000 machines in Japan before the year end. By the end of 1979, an estimated 750,000 Space Invaders machines were installed worldwide, including 400,000 in Japan and 85,000 in the United Kingdom. Within a year of releasing in the United States, 60,000 units were in the country; the number of units in the United States eventually reached 72,000 by 1982. Nishikado wanted to design newer hardware to stay competitive, but the widespread demand led Taito to support the existing Space Invaders hardware by creating new games compatible with it. This provided other companies time to develop technology that could match Taito's. Space Invaders cabinets have since become collector's items, with the cocktail and cabaret versions the rarest. At the end of 2003, Taito announced plans to produce 10,000 Space Invaders cabinets to sell again for the game's 25th anniversary.

The 1980 port to the Atari 2600 was the first official licensing of an arcade game for consoles and became the first killer app for home video game consoles after quadrupling the system's sales. Other official home releases include a 1980 conversion for Atari 8-bit computers and a 1982 release for the Atari 5200 console. Taito released its own version for the Nintendo Famicom in 1985 exclusively in Japan. By 1982, versions of Space Invaders were available for handheld electronic game devices, tabletop dedicated consoles, home computers, watches and pocket calculators.

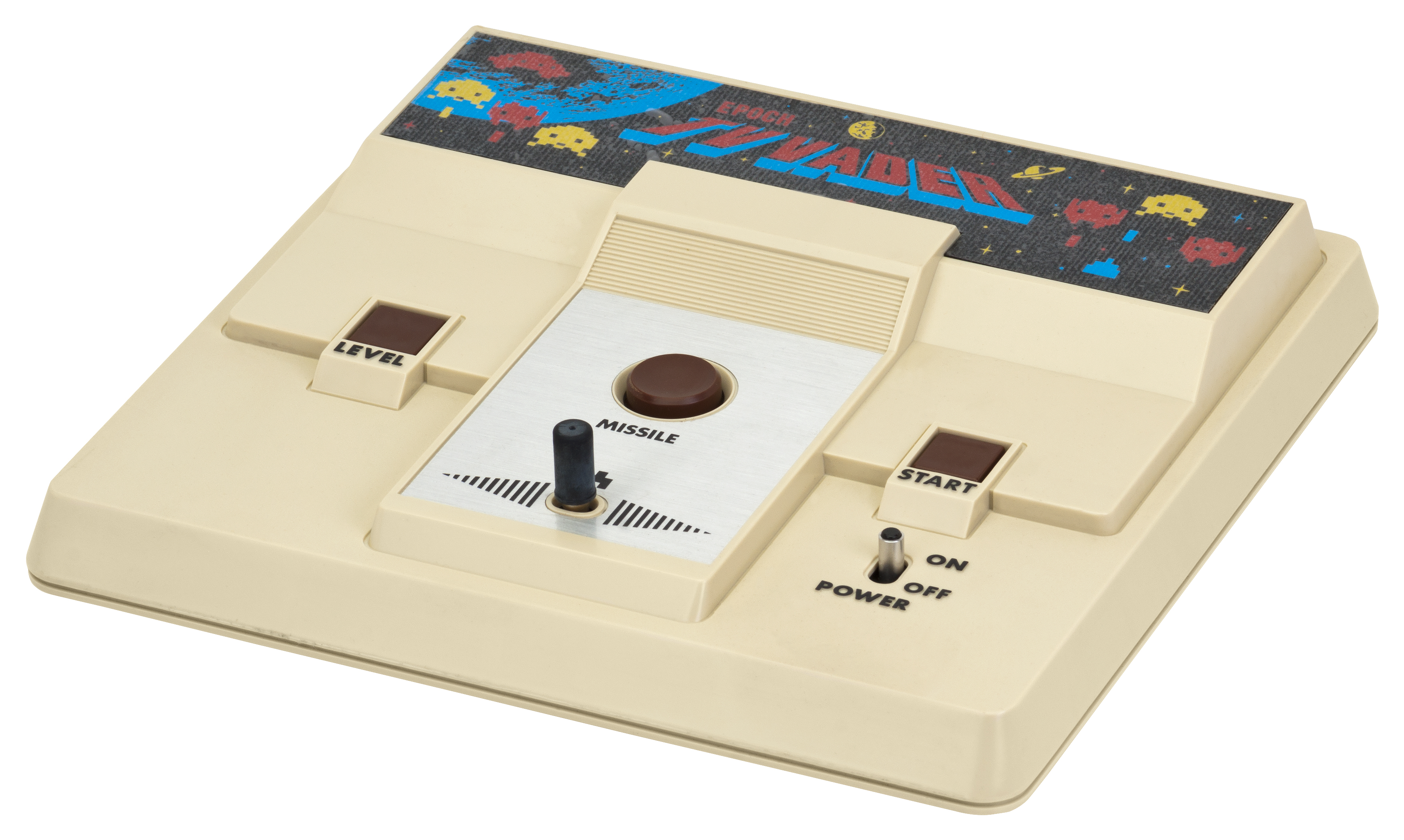
In Japan, Epoch Co. released the Epoch TV Vader in 1980 as a Space Invaders clone that could be played at home.

More than a hundred Space Invaders video game clones were released for various platforms. At the time, software and video games were not formally recognized as copyrighted works under Japanese copyright law. After the company won a case involving a sequel (Space Invaders Part II) in the Tokyo District Court in December 1982, Taito could pursue legal action against unauthorized reproductions. Clone examples include the 1979 Super Invader for Apple computers, Epoch Co.'s 1980 TV Vader dedicated home console, and the 1981 TI Invaders for the TI-99/4A computer; the latter became the top-selling game for its platform by the end of 1982. Prior to its industry dominance, Nintendo's foray into arcade games consisted of clones of existing popular games, including the 1979 Space Invaders clone Space Fever. The influx of clones led to the term "Invader game" to identify the generic classification of games. Unofficial copies dominated the video game market in South Korea, and the market demand for the machine's hardware spurred the early growth of Korea's semiconductor industry.

== Reception ==
Space Invaders initially received mixed responses from within Taito and little interest from Japanese amusement arcade owners. Nishikado's colleagues praised it, applauding his achievement while queuing up to play, whereas his bosses predicted low sales as games often ended more quickly than timer-based arcade games. While amusement arcade owners initially rejected it, pachinko parlors and bowling alleys adopted the game; Space Invaders caught on in those businesses, with many parlors and alleys installing additional cabinets. Within months, the game became so popular that specialty video arcades, referred to as "Space Invaders Parlours" and "Space Invaders Houses", opened with nothing but Space Invaders cabinets.

A year after its release, Space Invaders became the arcade game industry's all-time best-seller. It remained the top arcade game for three years through 1980. By the end of 1978, the game had grossed Taito US$670 million (equivalent to $3.3 billion in 2025) in Japan alone. By June 1979, each arcade machine was earning an average of $46 (equivalent to $204 in 2025) per day. Space Invaders' popularity propelled it to become the first game that recouped a United States arcade machine's owner within a month of purchasing; prices ranged from $2,000 to $3,000 per machine in 1982. It had grossed more than $1 billion by 1979 (equivalent to $4.9 billion in 2025). In 1981, the game earned $7.7 million weekly in arcades in the United States, second only to Pac-Man. The Arcade Awards ceremony was created that same year to honor the best video games, with Space Invaders winning the first Best Coin-Op Electronic Game award. By 1982, it had grossed $2 billion (equivalent to $6.67 billion in 2025), with a net profit of $450 million (equivalent to $2.22 billion in 2025). This made it the best-selling video game and highest-grossing "entertainment product" of its time, with comparisons made to the then highest-grossing film Star Wars, which had grossed $486 million, with a net profit of $175 million in the early 1980s. By 1982, it had grossed $3.8 billion, equivalent to over $13 billion as of 2016. Space Invaders earned Taito profits of over $500 million by 2008 (equivalent to $748 million in 2025).

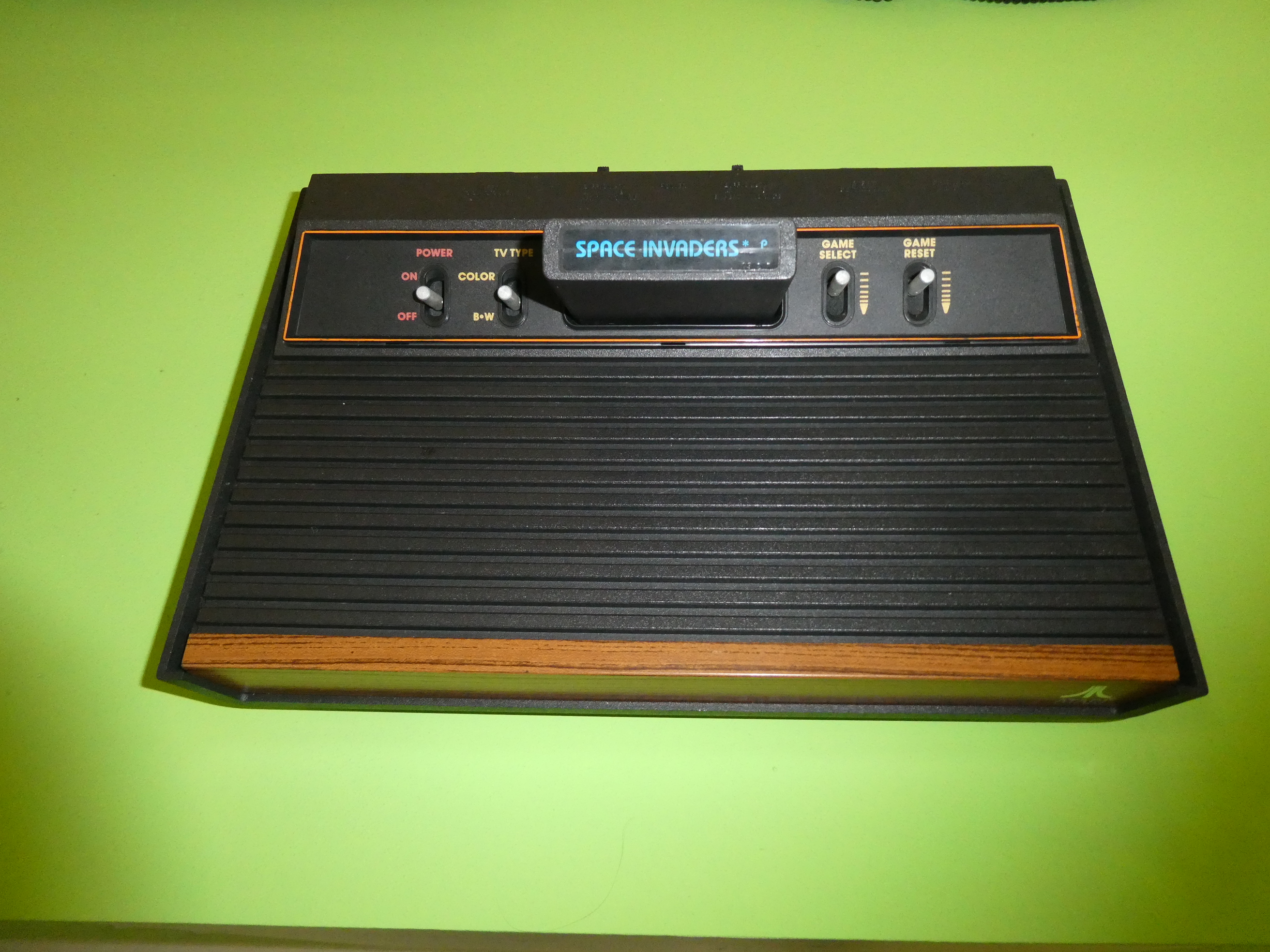
Atari 2600 home console with a Space Invaders cartridge, one of the system's best selling games, at the Etopia Centre for Arts & Technology

Ports have received mixed reviews; the Atari 2600 version was successful, while the Famicom version was poorly received. After selling over 1.0 million units its first year, the Atari 2600 port sold over 4.2 million copies by the end of 1981, becoming the best-selling Atari 2600 game until the 1982 Atari version of Pac-Man released. By 1983, the Atari 2600 version had sold almost 6.1 million cartridges. Bill Kunkel and Frank Laney in Video magazine found the variants on the arcade game interesting but suggested that purists will probably focus on the original version of the game included. Media writer Howard J. Blumenthal suggested that it requires skilled agility and hand-eye coordination and concluded that it was "a highly competitive reaction game, and one of the best available." Electronic Games magazine writers rated the game a perfect ten overall, noting high rankings for single-player gameplay, while only finding the game's graphics and sound to be merely good. The writers also reviewed the port for Atari's 8-bit home computers, complimenting the game for its excelling gameplay while finding its graphics and sound and enjoyment as a one-player game to be merely "good". Conversely, an editor for the Personal Computers & Games book found this version to be unfaithful to the original game, recommending Roklan's Deluxe Invaders for an experience more attuned to Taito's arcade game.

=== Retrospective ===
Reception

Review scores
Publication	Score
AllGame	Arcade: 5/5; Atari 5200: 4/5; SNES: 4/5
Eurogamer	Arcade: 9/10
Games World	Game Boy: 80%

Awards
Publication	Award
Arcade Awards	Best Coin-Op Electronic Game (1980)
VideoGames	Runner-up for Best Game Boy Game (1994)
The Times	Most Influential Video Game Ever (2007)

The game has received a positive retrospective reception decades after its release. In rating the arcade release a perfect five stars, Brett Alan Weiss of Allgame noted Space Invaders' groundbreaking features and quick success in the United States. While he pointed out the arcade version's simple graphics and level of engagement haven't aged well, Spanner Spencer of Eurogamer lauded the game's historical impact. He further described Space Invaders as the epitome of fundamental gameplay with "no frills" that retro game enthusiasts seek.

Ports of the original received generally positive reviews from video game publications. Weiss rated two of the console ports favorably but slightly lower than the arcade. Comparing it to the Atari 2600 version, Weiss complimented the gameplay of the Atari 5200 release, commenting that the different gameplay is a welcome change from the arcade game, but questioned why both Atari console versions were so similar. Writing for Entertainment Weekly, Aaron Morales ranked it the third top game for the Atari 2600 in 2013, citing how it demonstrated that good ports were possible on the console. Reviewing the Super Nintendo Entertainment System release, Weiss praised the quality of the graphic's reproduction as well as how enjoyable the different modes are to play. Conversely, he noted how simplistic the visual are by contemporary standards and commented that players unfamiliar with older games would find it "archaic". Games World magazine's four reviewers—Dave Perry, Nick Walkland, Nick Roberts, and Adrian Price—praised the release for the Game Boy handheld console. While several noted the nostalgia as a major selling point, they also said that the basic gameplay was dated. Perry and Roberts drew attention to its improved graphics when played on the Super Game Boy, which they considered the best way to play it. Writing for Polygon in 2019, Jeremy Parish ranked this version the 21st-greatest Game Boy game.

Numerous publications have ranked Space Invaders among the most important video games. Editors from Flux and Next Generation magazines listed it on their respective lists of top video games in 1995 and 1996. Flux magazine staff ranked Space Invaders the top game and lauded the scenario for deviating from the contemporary trend of reality-based simulations. They noted that while most games are classics for being either revolutionary or pure, Space Invaders was both. In placing the game at number 97, Next Generation editors wrote that it "provides an elegance and simplicity not found in later games." In 2021, Keith Stuart of The Guardian listed it as the third-greatest video game of the 1970s.

Several publications have regarded Space Invaders as an influential game. Ryan Geddes and Daemon Hatfield of IGN listed it as one of the "Top 10 Most Influential Games" in 2007, citing it as a source of inspiration to video game designers and the impact it had on the shooting genre. Writing for The Times Online, Michael Moran ranked it the "most influential video game ever" in 2007, citing its "immensely addictive" gameplay and explosive effect on the industry's growth. In describing it as a "seminal arcade classic", IGN's Levi Buchanan listed the game as the number eight "classic shoot 'em up" that same year. 1UP.com's Rowan Kaiser ranked it the third "Most Influential Game of All Time" in 2011, calling Space Invaders "the first video game as a video game, instead of merely a playable electronic representation of something else" like earlier arcade games. Space Invaders was inducted into the World Video Game Hall of Fame in 2016. Nishikado noted that he had little attachment to the game for twenty years following its release. He previously considered an earlier game, the 1974 Speed Race, his favorite project over Space Invaders. After learning how much the game is still played and appreciated decades later, he changed his opinion in the 2010s, recognizing Space Invaders as his best work.

== Legacy ==
=== Remakes and sequels ===
Space Invaders has been remade on numerous platforms and spawned many sequels. Re-releases include ported and updated versions of the original arcade game, some of which feature different graphics and additional gameplay options. Sequels feature several modes of gameplay and integrate new elements into the original design. Bally released a pinball version in 1980 with no elements of the arcade game present and the aliens resembling the xenomorphs from the film Alien; Bally was successfully sued over the resemblance to H. R. Giger's designs. It became the third highest-grossing pinball machine of 1980 in the United States. Super Impulse released a miniature version in 2017 as part of its Tiny Arcade series. For the series' 45th anniversary, Numskull Designs created another miniature arcade cabinet in 2023, released in the company's Quarter Arcades line.

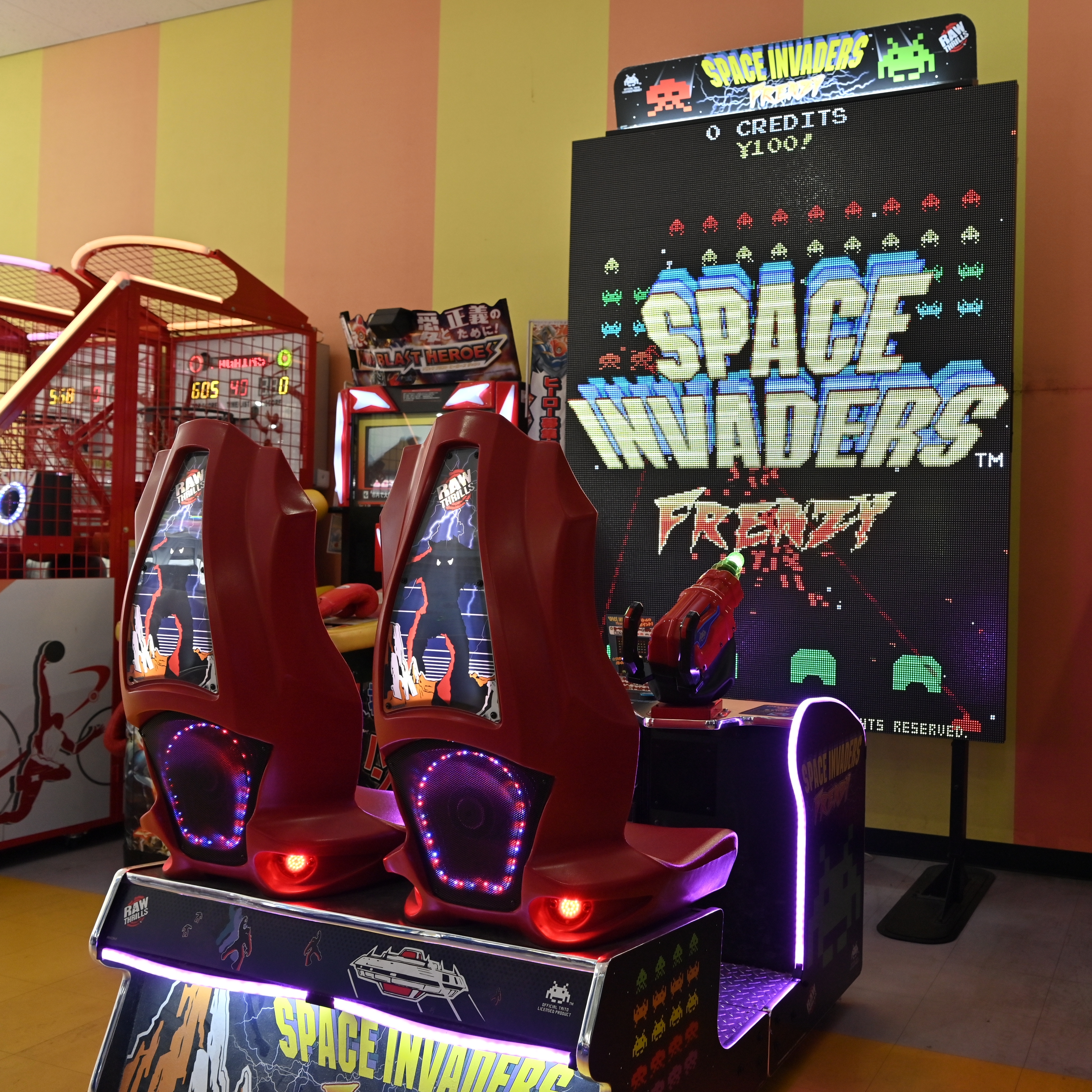
The 2017 Space Invaders Frenzy integrated electro-mechanical gameplay in a sit-down arcade machine.

Taito has released several arcade sequels. The first was Space Invaders Part II in 1979 featuring color graphics, an attract mode, new gameplay elements, and added an intermission between gameplay. This was released in the United States as Deluxe Space Invaders (also known as Space Invaders Deluxe), but featured a different graphical color scheme and a lunar-city background. Another arcade sequel, Space Invaders II, was released exclusively in the United States. It was in a cocktail-table format with very fast alien firing and a competitive two-player mode. During the summer of 1985, Return of the Invaders was released with updated color graphics and more complex movements and attack patterns for the aliens. Subsequent arcade sequels included Super Space Invaders '91, Space Invaders DX, and Space Invaders '95, each introducing minor gameplay additions to the original design. Several of the arcade sequels have become collector's items, though some are considered rarer. In 2002, Taito released Space Raiders, a third-person shooter reminiscent of Space Invaders. Space Invaders Extreme, released on the Nintendo DS and PlayStation Portable in 2008, integrates musical elements into the standard gameplay. A 2008 spin-off for WiiWare, Space Invaders Get Even, allows players to control the aliens instead of the laser cannon in a reversal of roles. Later arcade releases include Space Invaders Frenzy in 2017 and Space Invaders Counter Attack in 2020. Both games feature two-player electro-mechanical gameplay with a large amount of invaders.

Space Invaders and its related games have been included in video game compilations. Space Invaders Anniversary was released in 2003 for the PlayStation 2 and included nine Space Invader variants. A similar game for the PlayStation Portable, Space Invaders Pocket, was released in 2005. Space Invaders, Space Invaders Part II and Return of the Invaders are included in Taito Legends, a compilation of Taito's classic arcade games released in 2005 on the PlayStation 2, Xbox, and PC. Super Space Invaders '91, Space Invaders DX, and Space Invaders '95 were included in Taito Legends 2, a sequel compilation released in 2006. In 2025, Blaze Entertainment announced it would release a Taito-themed Alpha bartop arcade and a Taito cartridge for the Evercade handheld game console, both of which include Space Invaders among other classic Taito games. Hamster Corporation digitally released the game the same year as part of its multi-platform Arcade Archives series for the Nintendo Switch and PlayStation 4, as well as their Arcade Archives 2 series for the Nintendo Switch 2, PlayStation 5 and Xbox Series X/S in December 2025. The company's president, Satoshi Hamada, considered Space Invaders an iconic game that grew the industry, which he felt made it the best choice for the Arcade Archives' 500th milestone.

=== Industry impact ===
"Space Invaders and games like it represent the roots of everything we see today in gaming. It represents the birth of a new art form, one that literally changed the world. Space Invaders is important as an historical artifact, no less than the silent films of the early twentieth century or early printed books."

— Video game developer Warren Spector on Space Invaders' industry impact

Figures in the video game industry have highlighted Space Invaders's milestones and the impact they have had. Shigeru Miyamoto, the longtime general manager of Nintendo Entertainment Analysis & Development, considers Space Invaders the most revolutionary video game. Video game historian Alexander Smith described Nishikado's design of "allowing targets to attack the player" without a timer as "a new paradigm in video games." Developer Eugene Jarvis noted that many games "still rely on the multiple life, progressively difficult level paradigm" of Space Invaders and that the game's characters, story, and action "laid the groundwork for a whole generation" of video games. Parish credits Space Invaders as the first to capitalize on quirky characters, noting that the alien characters' "charm" and "rudimentary sense of personality" helped video games break away from a "realistic simulation" design style—previous games were predominantly inspired by sports and racing. Video game journalists Brian Ashcraft and Jean Snow attribute the introduction of multiple video game lives to Space Invaders. While several publications have credited the game for introducing the concept of saving high scores, the 1976 coin-op video game Sea Wolf implemented the feature first, though also allowed the player to reset it by pushing a button.

Electronic Games writers observed an increase of science fiction and space-themed games following Space Invaders' release. They noted that many built upon its gameplay through iterative changes, like Galaxian and derivatives with a similar style, while others drew inspiration from Space Invaders but took the design in new directions, such as Atari's Asteroids and Activision's Laser Blast. Scott Osborne of GameSpy noted the derivative design of Namco's 1979 Galaxian and 1981 Galaga games but acknowledged that their innovative changes and refinements made the games very successful in their own right. The game's influence extended to the development of Williams Electronics's first game, the 1981 Defender; early versions drew heavily from Space Invaders before its developer, Jarvis, took it a different direction. Outside shooting games, Sega/Gremlin's 1979 Head On adopted the concept of "going round after round" in lieu of a timer after a senior developer from its parent company, Sega, had seen Space Invaders. The game's designer, Lane Hauck, credits this change to Head On's success.

==== Shooting games ====
McCarthy considered Space Invaders an early game that shaped the wider shooter genre. In listing it as one of the ten most influential games, Geddes and Hatfield credited Space Invaders for introducing design elements that became commonplace in the industry. The two attributed the popularity of shooting-endless-waves-of-enemies gameplay to the creation of the shoot 'em up subgenre, citing games such as Galaga, Centipede, and Ikaruga as its lineage. Kevin Bowen of GameSpy noted that numerous games, such as Galaga and Gradius, have been influenced by the gameplay established by Space Invaders. Edwards also credited it for spawning the shoot 'em up subgenre, which was very prominent in Japan during the 1980s and early 1990s. He noted that though there were several notable shooting games before it, Space Invaders "put it all together" in a way unseen before. Gamest magazine staff also considered it the beginning of the shooting game genre, outlining the evolution of games from fixed shooters, such as Space Invaders and Galaga, to scrolling shooters, such as Scramble and the Gradius series.

Writing for GameSetWatch in 2010, Simon Carless noted a similar influence on contemporary first-person shooters like Call of Duty: Modern Warfare 2, commenting that it and Space Invaders share core principles: take cover behind walls and shoot enemies to obtain a high score. Ashcraft credits the game with the origin of the cover system of gameplay, as well as the use of destructible barriers. Video game journalist Craig Grannell noted that since its introduction in Space Invaders, the destructible shields concept has become a commonplace element in games. In observing the lineage between Space Invaders and Wolfenstein 3D, English professor Ronald Strickland commented that the two, as well as all previous first-person shooting games, were grounded on the same theme of "kill or be killed". Interactive media professor Frans Mäyrä made a similar comparison to Doom, commenting that both present a clear challenge to survive by "shooting everything that moves." Nishikado attributed the game's popularity among younger players to these elements, commenting that the more interactive attacks from enemies, coupled with the requirement to defeat them all, made the gameplay more thrilling.

==== Video game audio ====
Recording of Space Invaders' music, as heard during gameplay
Space Invaders music
The game's signature looping four-note bassline has been recognized as an early innovation in video game music

Music scholar Andrew Schartmann wrote that the fundamental audio techniques Space Invaders introduced shaped the industry and that the game's immense popularity facilitated a widespread adoption of those techniques. Prior to Space Invaders, music typically played during introductions or closings. Its looped music plays during gameplay while the game's interactions generate sound effects, which together Schartmann described as a "rich sonic landscape". He further noted that while the four-note loop seemed "pedestrian", its ability to stir a reaction from players moved video games closer to an art form. The changing tempo popularized variability in game music; developers later applied the strategy to pitch, rhythm, form, and other parameters to accommodate nonlinear aspects of games. Karen Collins, a professor of interactive media, echoed similar statements, noting that the combination of introducing continuous background music and dynamically changing the pace during gameplay was itself a worthy milestone.

Next Generation editor Neil West cited Space Invaders's music as an example of great video game art, commenting on how the simple melody's increasing tempo and synchronization with the enemies' movement chills and excites the player. Tommy Tallarico, a video game composer and sound designer, cited Space Invaders as an example of how video game music is "not a passive linear medium", stating that the interaction elevates the experience to a higher level for the senses. He echoed West's assessment, commenting that the simple beats increased the player's heart rate—instilling a sense of panic—as the invaders approached the bottom of the screen. In describing the audio's increasing pace, video game journalist and historian Bill Loguidice likened the background music to the sound of a heartbeat. He noted that the effect carried forward into other games; for example, Dungeons of Daggorath features a similar heartbeat sound to indicate player health. Writing for GameSpot, Glenn McDonald made similar observations about the effect the game's audio and noted a similar technique used in Asteroids.

==== Growth of industry ====
Space Invaders's success is considered a watershed moment for the Japanese video game industry. Parish called Space Invaders Japan's first "hit game". Martin Picard, a scholar of Japanese culture, called the game's release the turning point for the Japanese video game industry, which led to the global spread of the country's gaming creativity.

Numerous publications pointed to the game's success as a catalyst for the video game industry's growth. Electronic Games's editors called Space Invaders the impetus behind video gaming becoming a rapidly growing hobby in 1981 and "the single most popular coin-operated attraction of all time." Edge staff ascribed the shift of games from bars and amusement arcades to more mainstream locations, such as restaurants and department stores, to Space Invaders; by the end of the 1970s, arcade games began appearing in hotel lobbies, airports, and convenience stores. Writing for IGN, Levi Buchanan attributed the launch of the "arcade phenomenon" in North America in part to the title. Staff for Game Informer magazine considered it, along with Pac-Man, one of the most popular arcade games for tapping into popular culture and generating excitement during the golden age of arcades. Benj Edwards of 1UP.com wrote that Space Invaders demonstrated video games could compete against the major entertainment media at the time: films, music, and television.

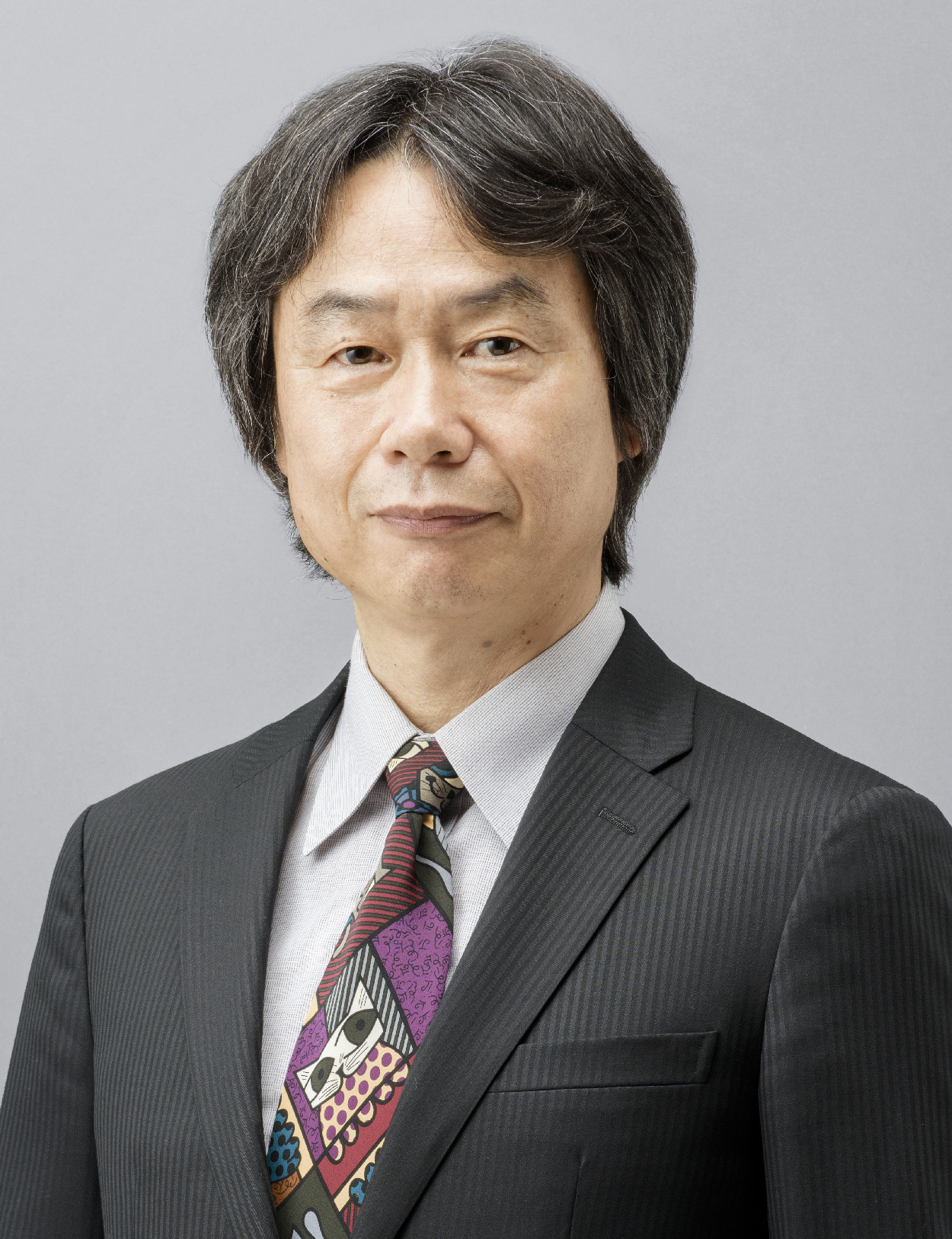
Shigeru Miyamoto (shown in 2015)

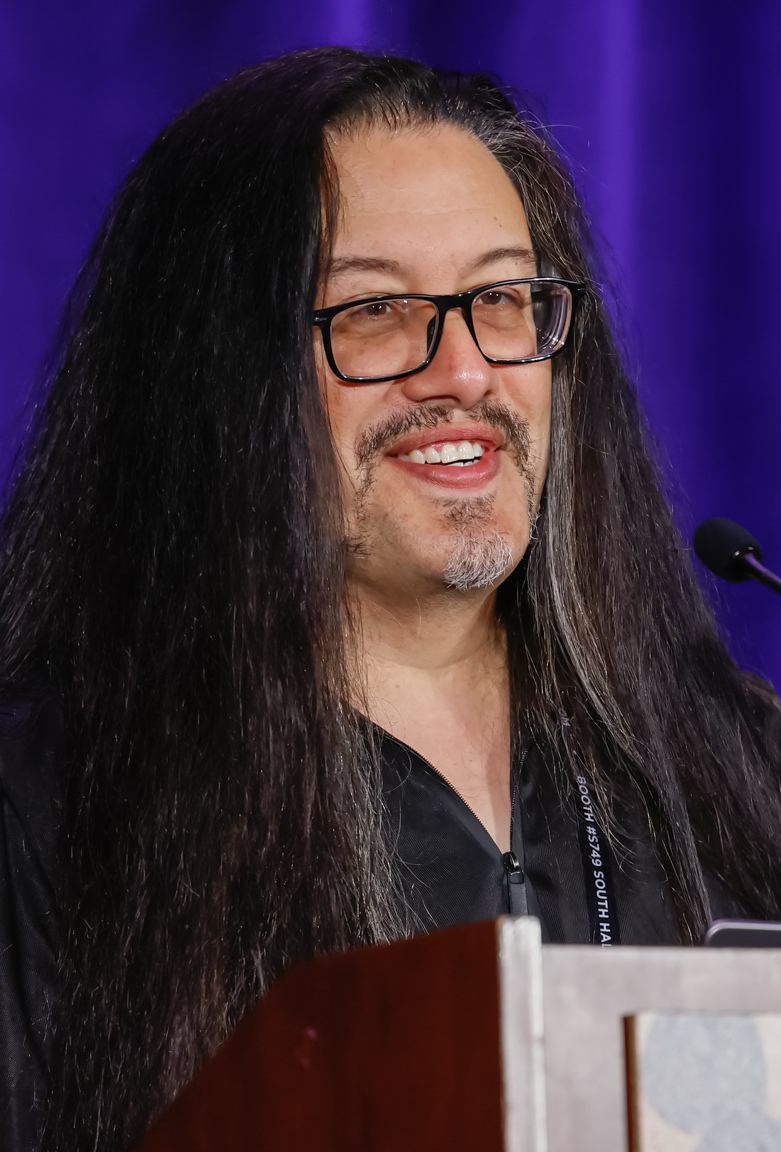
John Romero (shown in 2022)

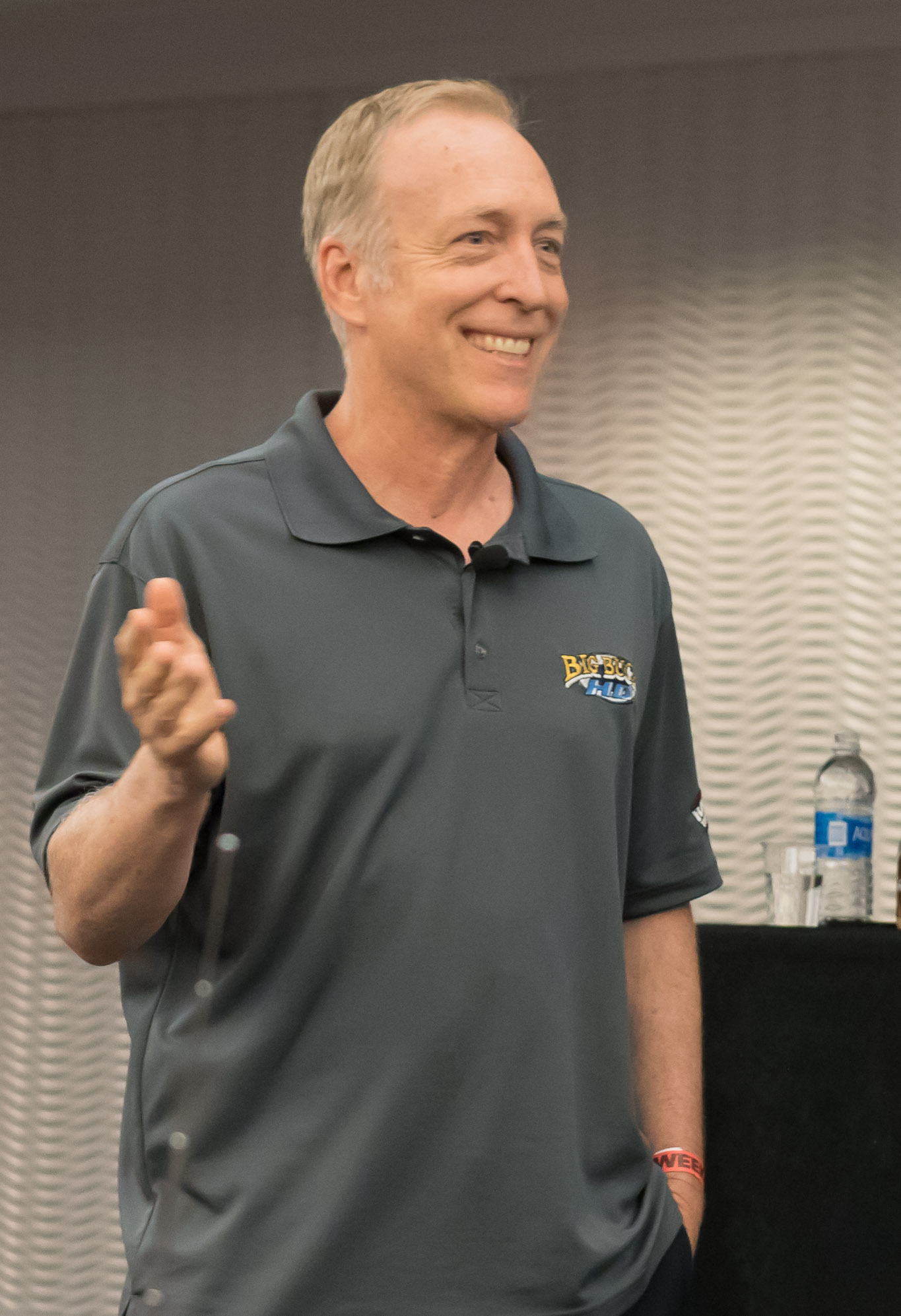
Eugene Jarvis (shown in 2016)

Space Invaders inspired numerous video game developers who have gone on to shape the industry in their own right.

Several game developers cited Space Invaders as their introduction to video games. Miyamoto—the creator of Donkey Kong, Mario, and The Legend of Zelda—commented that the game incited his interest in video games, leading him to pursue it as a profession. During his time in junior high school, Pokémon creator Satoshi Tajiri felt inspired to make a Space Invaders sequel after playing it. Hideo Kojima, creator of Metal Gear, cites Space Invaders as the first game that "pulled him in". Jarvis began his career at Williams Electronics developing pinball games but pursued arcade games after seeing Space Invaders's gameplay, leading him to work on Defender. He described the industry scene at the time as an "incredible universe now open to video game designers", citing the hype of Space Invaders and other popular space games released around 1979. The creators of Doom, John Romero and John Carmack, have named it as their introduction to video games. Romero commented that he thought games like Space Invaders and Targ opened up creative possibilities because they were not limited by physical materials like pinball and electromagnetic games. Andrew and Philip Oliver, the creators of the Dizzy series, ascribed their initial desire for video games to Space Invaders. Writing for The Observer, Giles Richards attributed the popularity of the game's home console versions to encouraging users to learn programming, many of which later becoming industry leaders.

=== In media ===
Musicians have drawn inspiration for their music from Space Invaders. Soon after the game's arcade release, the Japanese synthpop group Yellow Magic Orchestra reproduced Space Invaders sounds in its 1978 self-titled album and hit single "Computer Game"; the latter sold over 400,000 copies in the United States. The next year, the band Funny Stuff released "Disco Space Invaders" in Japan and songwriters Russell Dunlop and Bruce Brown released "Space Invaders" in Australia as the group Player One. The trend continued in 1980 with two more songs titled "Space Invaders"; one on the Pretenders' self-titled album and another by WGCL disc jockey Victor Blecman.

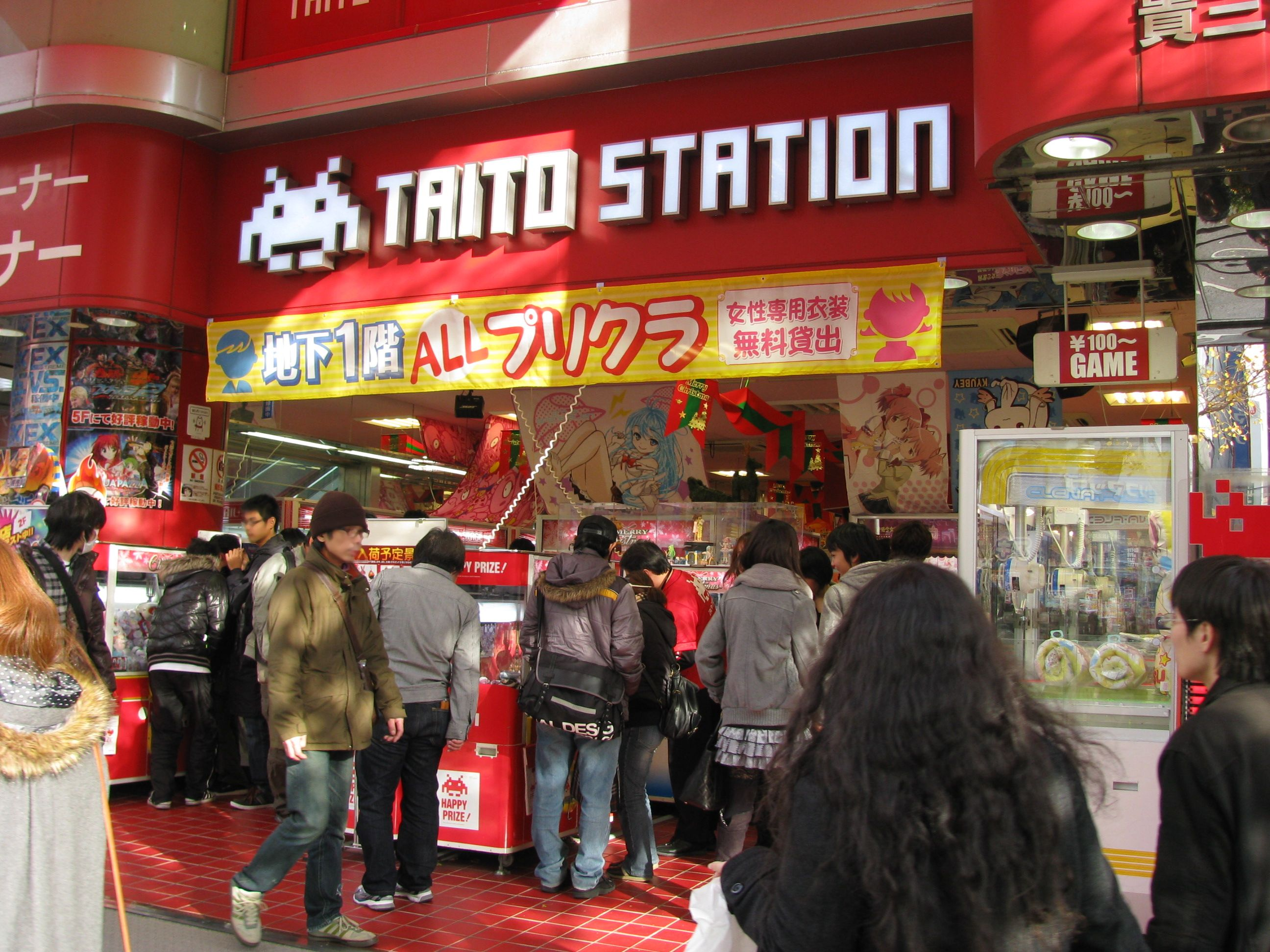
As part of the game's 30th anniversary, Taito showcased a music video for the 30th Anniversary Special Compilation Album in its Taito Station stores. Shown is the Taito Station in Akihabara.

Decades later, Video Games Live performed audio from Space Invaders as part of a special retro "Classic Arcade Medley" in 2007. In honor of the game's 30th anniversary, Taito produced an album, Space Invaders 2008, that features music inspired by the game. Released by Avex Trax in December 2008, the album includes six songs that were originally in the PSP version of Space Invaders Extreme. Taito produced a Space Invaders-themed animated music video to promote the album. Initially showcased only in its chain of stores (Taito Station) starting in April 2008, the company later released the video on DVD in October 2008.

Multiple television series have aired episodes that either reference or parody Space Invaders, such as Danger Mouse, That '70s Show, Scrubs, Chuck, Robot Chicken, Teenage Mutant Ninja Turtles and The Amazing World of Gumball. Elements are prominently featured in the "Raiders of the Lost Arcade" segment of "Anthology of Interest II", an episode of Futurama. The Space Invaders aliens appear in the French online short film Pixels, which Happy Madison Productions adapted into a feature film by the same name in 2015.

In 2010, Warner Bros. Pictures approached Taito for the film rights to the video game, with Mark Gordon, Jason Blum, and Guymon Casady attached as producers. By the time Warner Bros. acquired the rights in 2014, Akiva Goldsman was slated to produce. In February 2015, Daniel Kunka was set to write the script for the production company, Safehouse Pictures. The project stalled until July 2019, when Warner Bros.'s subsidiary, New Line Cinema, announced that Greg Russo would write the script. Goldsman remained the producer alongside Safehouse Pictures partners Joby Harold and Tory Tunnell. Taito filed the name Space Invaders for film production with the United States Patent and Trademark Office on July 7, 2021. Years later, Safehouse Pictures brought in Ben Zazove and Evan Turner in August 2025 to write a new script.

Space Invaders has been the subject of several books, such as the 1980 Space Invaders by Mark Roeder and Julian Wolanski, the 1982 Invasion of the Space Invaders by Martin Amis, and the 2006 Tomb Raiders and Space Invaders by Geoff King and Tanya Krzywinska. It has been recreated in other video games. Players have used the gameplay mechanics in the sandbox games Minecraft and Astroneer to reproduce Space Invaders. Epic Games included a hidden game in Fortnite that features gameplay similar to Space Invaders. In 2020, Taito made the error page of its website an interactive version of Space Invaders.

=== Cultural impact ===
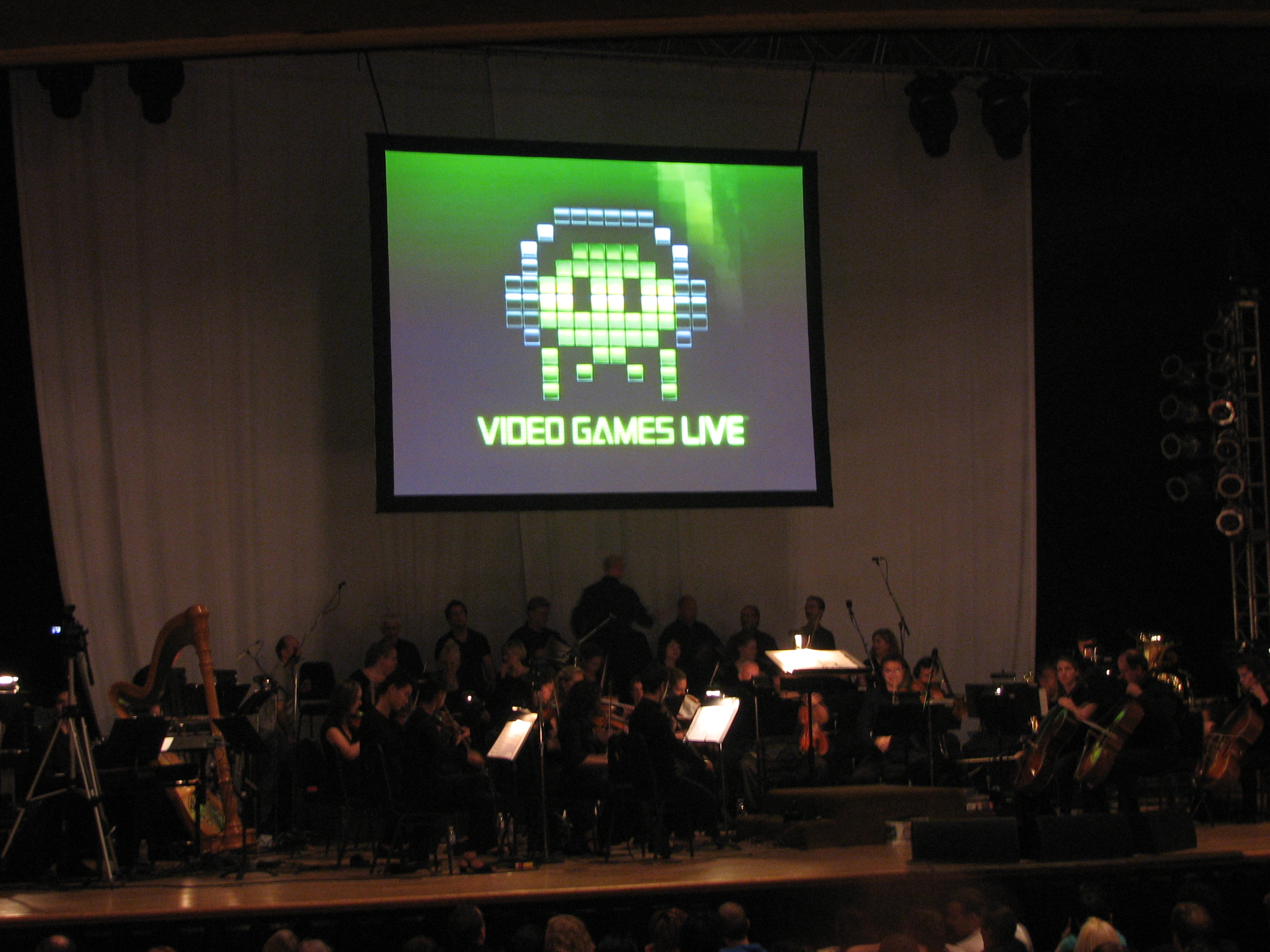
A pixelated alien graphic on display at the Video Games Live concert event

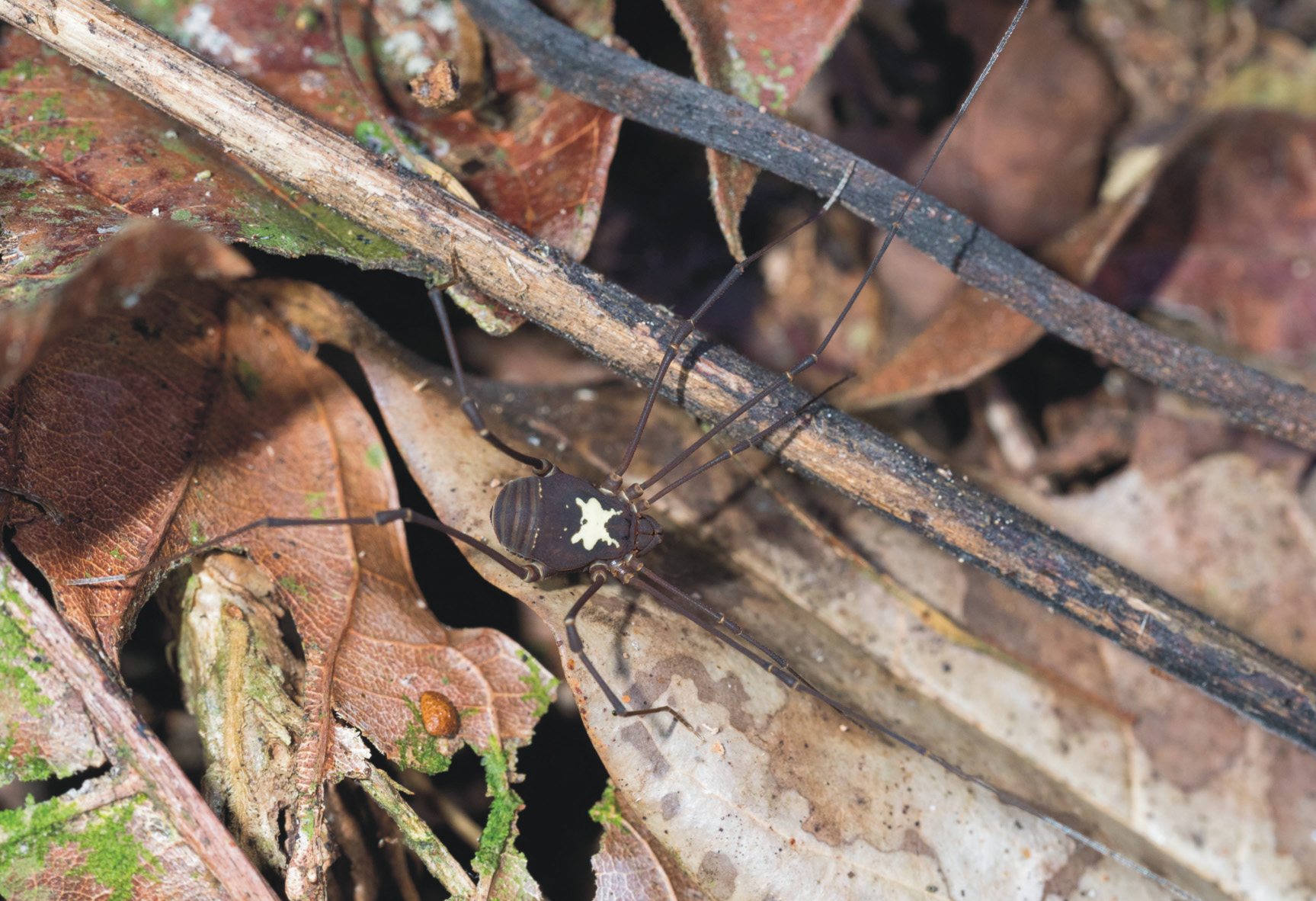
Taito adrik, a species of harvestman, has a fleck resembling a Space Invaders alien.

The Space Invaders alien characters have permeated several facets of culture.

Writing for The New York Times, Jeremy Horwitz compared Space Invaders's impact on the video game industry to that of the Beatles in the pop music industry. Video game journalist Chris Kohler considers Space Invaders "the first 'blockbuster' video game", stating that it became synonymous with video games worldwide for some time. Many publications and websites use the pixelated alien graphic as an icon for video games in general, including the video game magazine Electronic Gaming Monthly, technology website Ars Technica, and concert event Video Games Live. Brazilian zoologists Adriano Kury and Carla Barros named a new species of arachnid Taito spaceinvaders in 2014 due to the resemblance of the species' fleck on its dorsal scutum to a Space Invaders alien. The invader character was adapted into the "alien monster" emoji in version 10 of the Unicode standard in 2017.

The game has permeated numerous cultural aspects of society. In 1981, "Space Invaders Wrist" was documented as an ailment in The New England Journal of Medicine. Technology author and lecturer Tom Forester noted that North American doctors had identified a condition called "Space Invaders elbow" as a complaint in the 1980s. Highways England launched a safety campaign in 2018 titled "Don't be a Space Invader, Stay Safe, Stay Back"—featuring the game's logo and alien character—to raise awareness on the dangers of tailgating.

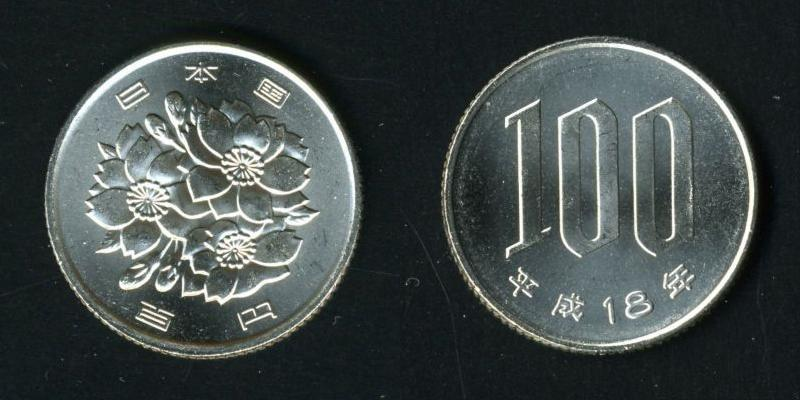
An urban legend attributed Space Invaders' popularity to a shortage of 100-yen coins in Japan

There were reports that its popularity led to a shortage of 100-yen coins in Japan, but descriptions from numismatists living in Japan at the time indicated "nothing out of the ordinary" around Space Invaders's release; Nishikado also expressed skepticism. Numismatist Mark Fox compared the production outputs of the Japan Mint during those years to the game's reported earnings and concluded that its impact did not change the outputs. He further noted that arcade operators would have regularly emptied their machines, which would keep the currency in circulation, and attributed the myth to lower 100-yen coin productions in 1978 and 1979. Writing in the The Numismatist, Charles Paradis agreed with Fox's analysis and noted that the Japan Mint and Bank of Japan did not have any evidence to support the myth. He attributed it to newspapers misrepresenting facts and Taito's lack of denial.

In 1980, Atari sponsored a nation-wide Space Invaders tournament in the United States. Media coverage of the tournament helped establish video gaming as a mainstream hobby. Video game journalist David McCarthy noted that players continued competing to achieve the highest score for Space Invaders decades after its release. Twin Galaxies, who officiated and tracked competitive high scores for players, recorded high scores for the arcade version and some of its handheld ports into the 2000s.

Several politicians have lobbied to restrict children from accessing the game. In the United Kingdom, George Foulkes proposed a Private Member's Bill in 1981 titled "Control of Space Invaders and other Electronic Games Bill" to allow local councils to restrict it and similar games via licensing for its "addictive properties" and for causing "deviancy". The bill was never considered by Parliament, as a motion to bring it up was defeated 114 votes to 94 votes. In 1981, the Irvington, New York board of trustees proposed a resolution to place age restrictions on Space Invaders and other arcade games as well as limit the quantity in businesses. A similar restriction occurred in Mesquite, Texas, resulting in a court case that was appealed to the Supreme Court of the United States, who ruled the city ordinance unconstitutional in 1982.

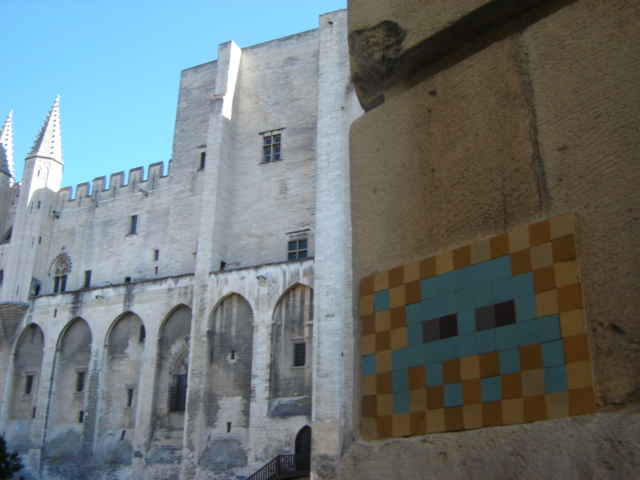
A tile mosaic of a Space Invader alien on a building in Avignon, France by anonymous French street artist Invader

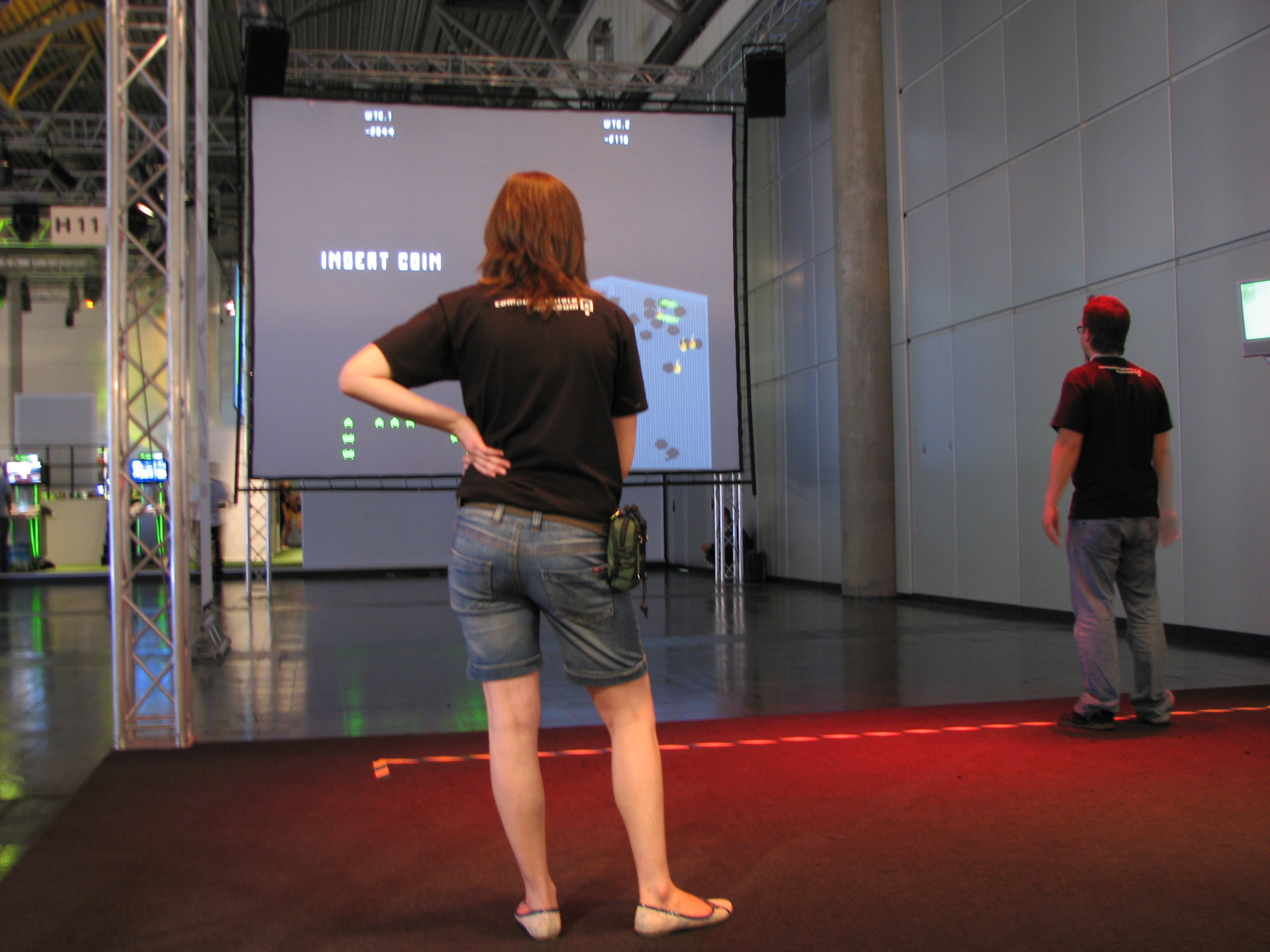
The interactive Invaders! art game at the 2008 Games Convention prior to the artist removing it following backlash.

The video game has inspired several pieces of art across different mediums.

Space Invaders has been the subject and inspiration for multiple pieces of art and endeavors. As part of the Japan Media Arts Festival's 10th anniversary in 2006, Space Invaders was one of several video game-related media selected to represent Japanese entertainment; the media were on display at a special exhibit at The National Art Center in Tokyo. The project selections were compiled by Japan's Agency for Cultural Affairs via a mix of polling from the general public and industry professionals. That same year, Space Invaders was included in the London Science Museum's Game On exhibition, meant to showcase aspects of video game history, development, and culture, and included in the Barbican Centre's traveling exhibition. At the Belluard Bollwerk International 2006 festival in Fribourg, Switzerland, Guillaume Reymond made a three-minute stop motion video recreation of a game of Space Invaders as part of the "Gameover" project using people sitting in auditorium seats as pixels. The GH ART exhibit at the 2008 Games Convention in Leipzig, Germany, included an art game named Invaders!, which featured Space Invaders's gameplay with references to the September 11 attacks in the United States. The game attracted criticism online and a response from Taito stating that it was "considering all available options – including legal actions." In response, the creator asked for Invaders! to be removed from the exhibit. A bridge in Cáceres, Spain, projected by engineers Pedro Plasencia and Hadrián Arias, features a pavement design based on Space Invaders, with the laser cannon, shots, and several figures visible on the deck. Anonymous French street artist Invader has created mosaic artwork of Space Invader aliens around the world, including the International Space Station and European Space Agency installations.
