= Pixels (2015 film) =

Film by Chris Columbus

- Theatrical release poster
- Directed by: Chris Columbus
- Screenplay by: Tim Herlihy; Timothy Dowling
- Story by: Tim Herlihy
- Based on: Pixels by Patrick Jean
- Produced by: Adam Sandler; Chris Columbus; Mark Radcliffe; Allen Covert
- Starring: Adam Sandler; Kevin James; Michelle Monaghan; Peter Dinklage; Josh Gad; Brian Cox
- Cinematography: Amir Mokri
- Edited by: Hughes Winborne
- Music by: Henry Jackman
- Production companies: Columbia Pictures; Happy Madison Productions; 1492 Pictures
- Distributed by: Sony Pictures Releasing
- Release date: July 24, 2015 (United States)
- Running time: 105 minutes
- Countries: United States; China; France
- Language: English
- Budget: $129 million (gross); $110 million (net)
- Box office: $244.9 million

Pixels is a 2015 science fiction comedy film directed by Chris Columbus from a screenplay by Tim Herlihy and Timothy Dowling. Loosely adapted from the 2010 French short film by Patrick Jean, the film stars Adam Sandler, Kevin James, Michelle Monaghan, Peter Dinklage, Josh Gad, and Brian Cox. In the film, an alien force misinterprets videotaped footage of classic arcade games as a declaration of war, resulting in them attacking Earth with technological recreations of icons from the games; the president of the United States assembles a team of former arcade champions to lead the planet's defense.

Development on the film began in 2010, when Sandler obtained the rights to the short film via his Happy Madison Productions company and hired Herlihy to write the script, with Dowling brought on for rewrites later in production. In 2013, Columbus entered talks to direct the film after being drawn to its nostalgic homage to 1980s arcade games such as Pac-Man, Donkey Kong and Space Invaders, all of which were licensed for use in the film. Principal photography took place in Toronto for three months, which involved extensive night shoots and practical sets. Visual effects and post-production, led by Digital Domain and Sony Pictures Imageworks, focused on creating voxelized and three-dimensional versions of arcade game characters to integrate into the live-action footage.

Pixels was released theatrically in the United States on July 24, 2015, by Sony Pictures Releasing. The film received negative reviews from critics, who criticized its writing, predictable plot, and humor, but praised the visual effects. The film grossed $245 million on a budget of $110 million. It was deemed to become the last Happy Madison film to be released in theaters, by the following deal from Netflix.

== Plot ==
In 1982, Sam Brenner and his friends Will Cooper and Ludlow "The Wonder Kid" Lamonsoff play at an amusement arcade together before Brenner participates in a video game championship, where he loses a Donkey Kong match to Eddie "The Fireblaster" Plant. Videotaped footage of the event is put in a time capsule that gets launched into outer space by NASA.

In the present, Brenner, now an electronics installer, is summoned alongside lieutenant colonel Violet van Patten to the White House, where Cooper, now President of the United States, shows surveillance footage of a besiegement at the Andersen Air Force Base in Guam. Brenner notes the attack's resemblance to the game Galaga, but Admiral James Porter of the United States Navy strongly advocates against its inference in the case. Brenner meets up with Ludlow, who reveals the attack was caused by an alien force that mistook the time capsule's footage as a declaration of war and are now challenging Earth to a best-of-three battle using technological recreations of the championship's games, claiming they have won the first match. The duo inform Cooper of a coordinated aim at India, but he dismisses their concerns.

After the aliens win the second match by demolishing the Taj Mahal as Arkanoid, Brenner and Ludlow train Navy SEALs to play the games while Violet develops effective rayguns. Calling themselves the "Arcaders", the group visits London, where the aliens attack Hyde Park as Centipede before being repelled by Brenner and Ludlow. The Arcaders recruit a convicted Eddie to assist in New York City, where they must battle a giant Pac-Man in Mini Coopers representing the ghosts. After overcoming the task, the Arcaders receive Q*bert as a trophy. During a celebration at the White House however, the aliens announce that one of them has cheated, meaning Earth forfeits the challenge. Before being abducted by the aliens, Violet's son Matty discovers Eddie cheated during the Pac-Man attack using a code written on his glasses, which was previously used in the championship.

The aliens attack Washington, D.C. with an army of video game characters. With Cooper and a repentant Eddie's help, the Arcaders fight through the onslaught while Ludlow persuades Lady Lisa, a video game character whom he has a crush on, to side with them. Brenner, Violet, Cooper and Q*bert are summoned to the aliens' mother ship for a final chance to save Earth by facing their leader as Donkey Kong. The group is placed on the game's starting level, with Donkey Kong and the captives at the top level. Struggling against the obstacles, Brenner loses hope until Matty reveals Eddie's cheating. Realizing he actually is the world's best Donkey Kong player, Brenner regains his spirit and defeats Donkey Kong, resulting in the aliens' forces, including Lisa, being neutralized.

The Arcaders are hailed as heroes as Cooper negotiates a peace agreement with the aliens. Eddie apologizes to Brenner for cheating and acknowledges him as the best Donkey Kong player. Seeing Ludlow devastated over Lisa's termination, Q*bert cheers him up by shapeshifting into her. Brenner and Violet begin a relationship while Eddie meets Serena Williams and Martha Stewart. The aliens end their invasion and return to their home planet. One year later, a now-married Ludlow and "Lisa" have Q*bert-like children.

== Cast ==
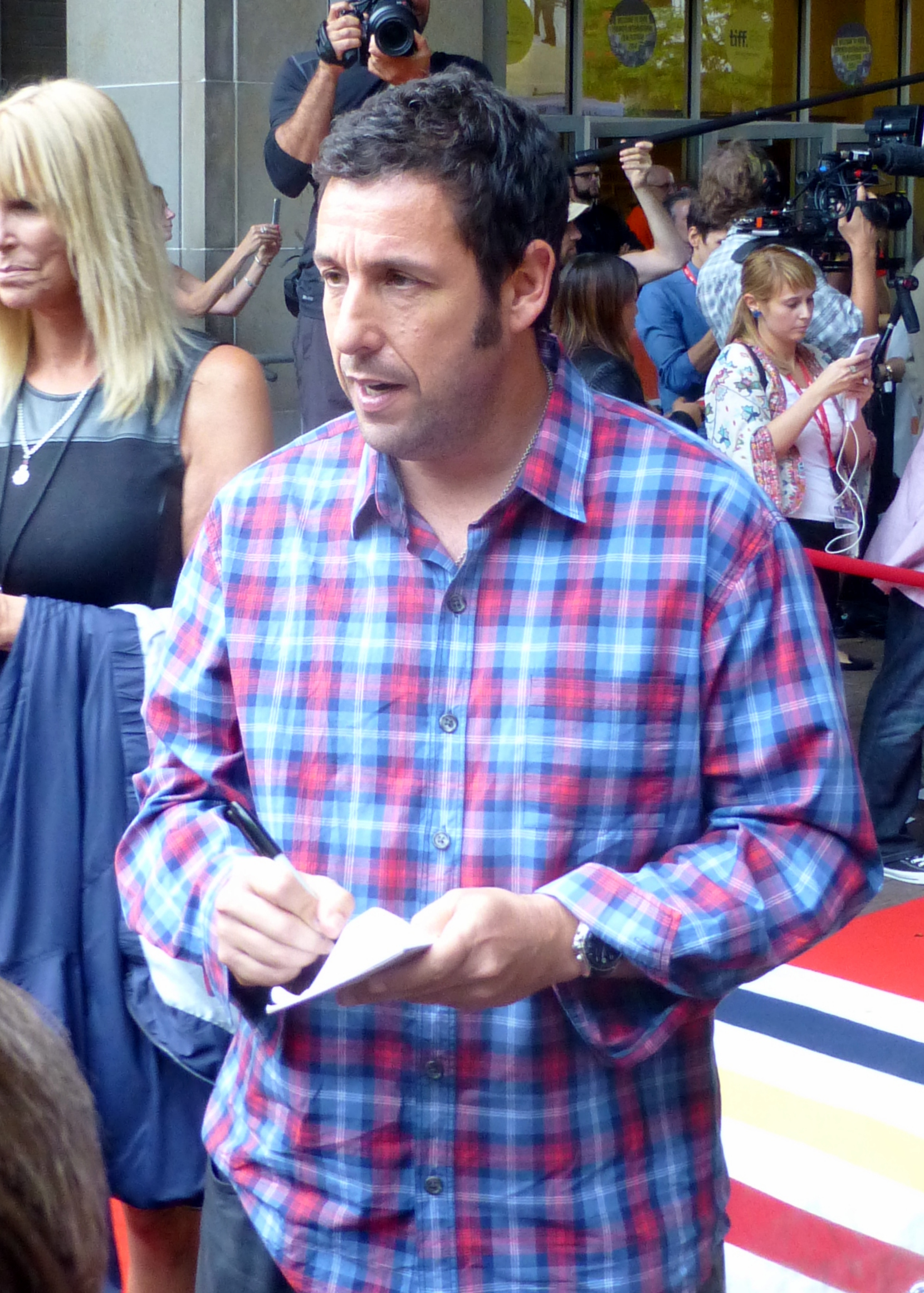
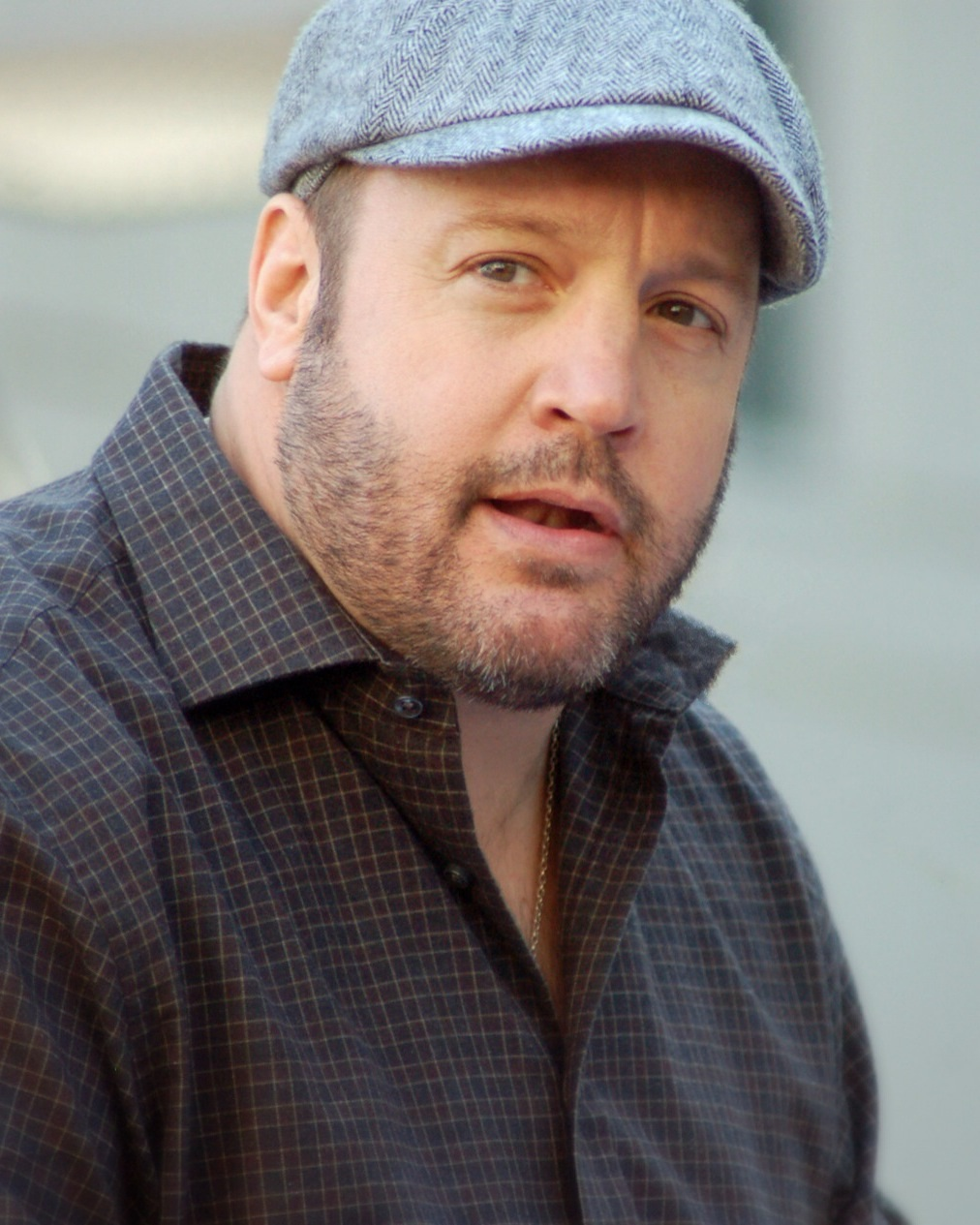
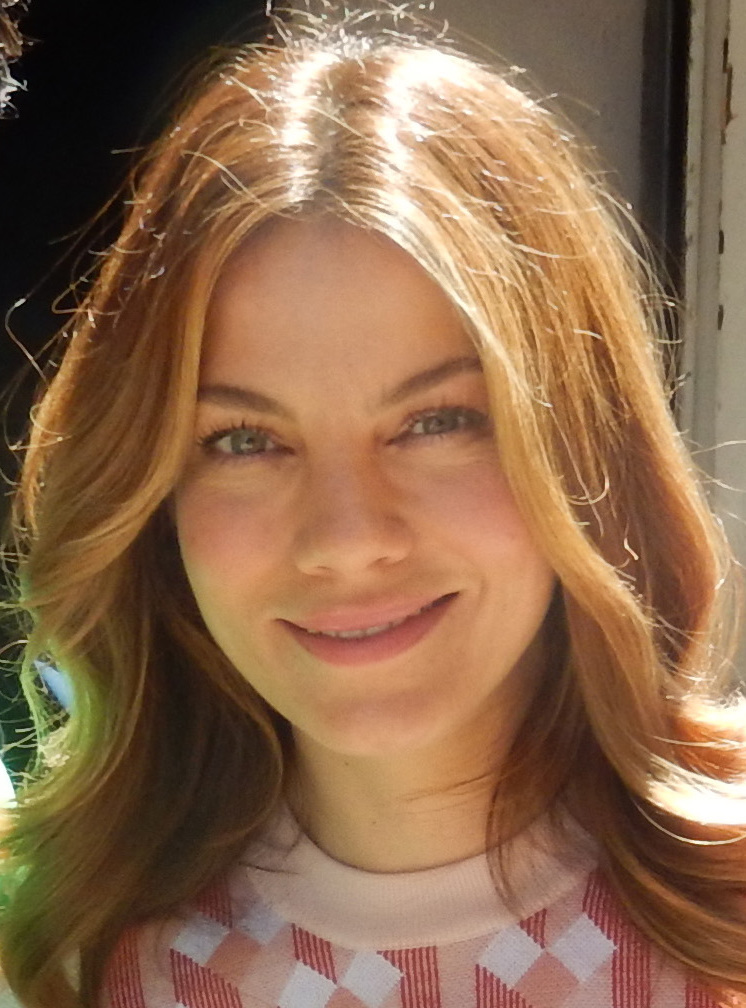
L to R: Adam Sandler (pictured in 2014), Kevin James (2011) and Michelle Monaghan (2015)
- Adam Sandler as Sam Brenner, a former arcade video game champion, Cooper's childhood friend and the leader of the Arcaders
  - Anthony Ippolito additionally portrayed the character's younger self in the film's prologue.
- Kevin James as Will "Chewie" Cooper, the disliked President of the United States, Brenner's childhood friend and a member of the Arcaders
  - Jared Riley additionally portrayed the character's younger self in the film's prologue.
- Michelle Monaghan as Lieutenant Colonel Violet van Patten, a divorced unique weapons developer and specialist for the military and a member of the Arcaders
- Peter Dinklage as Eddie "The Fireblaster" Plant, Sam's former childhood rival and a member of the Arcaders. The character was loosely inspired by Billy Mitchell, an arcade champion who became famous in the 1980s and 1990s for setting high scoring records in Pac-Man and Donkey Kong, before later being accused of cheating.
  - Andrew Bambridge additionally portrayed Eddie's younger self in the film's prologue.
- Josh Gad as Ludlow "The Wonder Kid" Lamonsoff, a conspiracy theory-obsessed genius with poor social skills and a member of the Arcaders
  - Jacob Shinder additionally portrayed the character's younger self in the film's prologue.
- Brian Cox as Admiral James Porter, a military heavyweight of the United States Navy
- Sean Bean as Corporal Hill of the British Armed Forces
- Jane Krakowski as Jane Cooper, the First Lady of the United States and Cooper's wife
- Affion Crockett as Sergeant Dylan Cohan, a soldier present during the Guam attack
- Ashley Benson as Lady Lisa, the glamorous protagonist of the fictional arcade video game Dojo Quest, and later as Q*bert's human form.
- Matt Lintz as Matty van Patten, Violet's son
- Lainie Kazan as Mickey Lamonsoff, Ludlow's grandmother

Denis Akiyama portrays Tōru Iwatani, the creator of the Pac-Man franchise whose hand gets bitten off by his own creation while attempting to console him, while the real Iwatani has a cameo appearance as a repairman at the amusement arcade that the Arcaders used to visit. Fiona Shaw portrays the prime minister of the United Kingdom, Dan Aykroyd portrays the master of ceremonies of the video game championship in the film's prologue and Matt Frewer returns as his Max Headroom character. Additional character voices are provided by Billy West and Holly Beavon; the former provided the vocal effects of Dojo Quest's primary enemies that attack a school bus during the film's climax and the latter provided the dubbed voice of Madonna in the aliens' first message.

== Production ==
=== Development ===
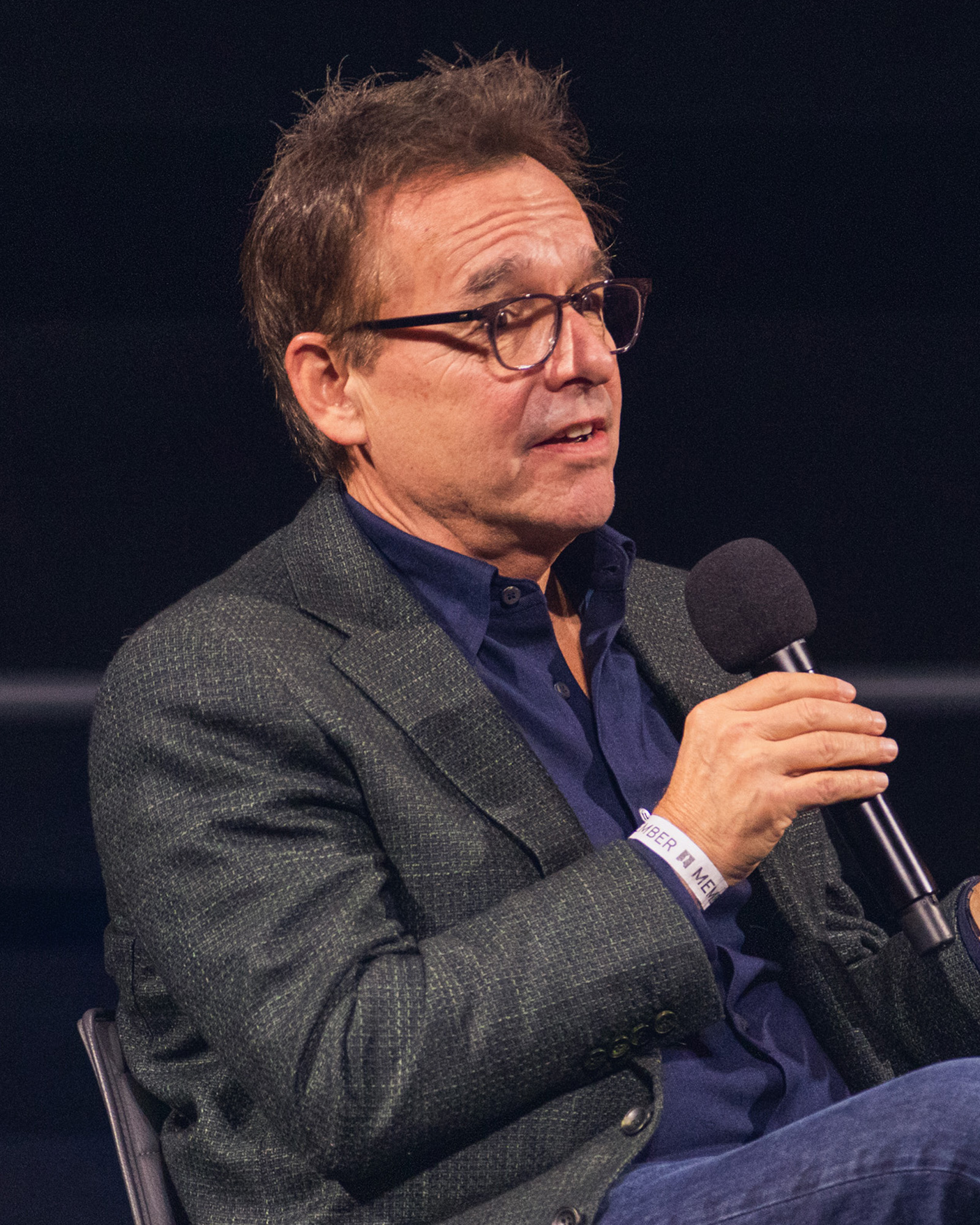
Director Chris Columbus in 2025

In 2010, it was announced that Adam Sandler had bought the film rights to French filmmaker Patrick Jean's video game-themed short film, Pixels, via his Happy Madison Productions company, and hired Tim Herlihy to write the script, a draft Herlihy had said everybody at the studio "hated". Herlihy and Sandler eventually came up with the concept of having Kevin James star in the film as the president of the United States and incorporated this element in the script. In July 2012, Timothy Dowling was hired to rewrite Herlihy's screenplay, with Seth Gordon being attached as both an executive producer and a possible candidate to direct the film.

Chris Columbus entered talks to direct the film in May 2013. Columbus explained that he first met Sandler to discuss a possible remake of the South Korean film Hello Ghost, and as Columbus left the meeting, Sandler handed him the script for Pixels. The script deeply affected Columbus, who considered it "one of the most original ideas I had seen since the Amblin days" and a good opportunity to harken back to the 1980s comedy films he worked on. Characters from classic arcade games such as Space Invaders, Pac-Man, Frogger, Galaga and Donkey Kong, among several others, were licensed for use in Pixels from video game companies like Atari, Taito, Konami, Bandai Namco Games and Nintendo. Q*bert was coincidentally already owned by Sony Pictures, as Columbia Pictures owned Gottlieb while they developed the original game.

There were originally plans to include a scene in which the Great Wall of China is attacked by the aliens, but the concept was removed from the script in hopes of improving the film's chances in the Chinese market. Nintendo also allowed the filmmakers to feature a cameo appearance of Mario in his Donkey Kong incarnation, though his Super Mario Bros. incarnation was intended to appear in a post-credits scene where an alien resembling him is revealed to have survived at the Washington Monument. Noting the filmmakers could not make the scene work, Columbus decided to have the scene excised from the final film.

=== Pre-production ===
On February 26, 2014, it was announced that Sandler would play the lead role in the film, while James and Josh Gad were in early talks to join the cast. On March 28, Peter Dinklage was in final talks to join the film, playing the fourth and final male lead. Jennifer Aniston was originally considered for the female lead, but declined due to scheduling conflicts. On April 4, Michelle Monaghan joined the film to star as the female lead instead. On June 11, Brian Cox joined the cast as military heavyweight Admiral Porter. The part of "Lady Lisa", the glamorous protagonist of the fictional arcade game Dojo Quest, was offered to Elisha Cuthbert, but she turned down the role, which went to Ashley Benson. On July 9, Jane Krakowski joined the cast as the First Lady of the United States.

=== Filming ===
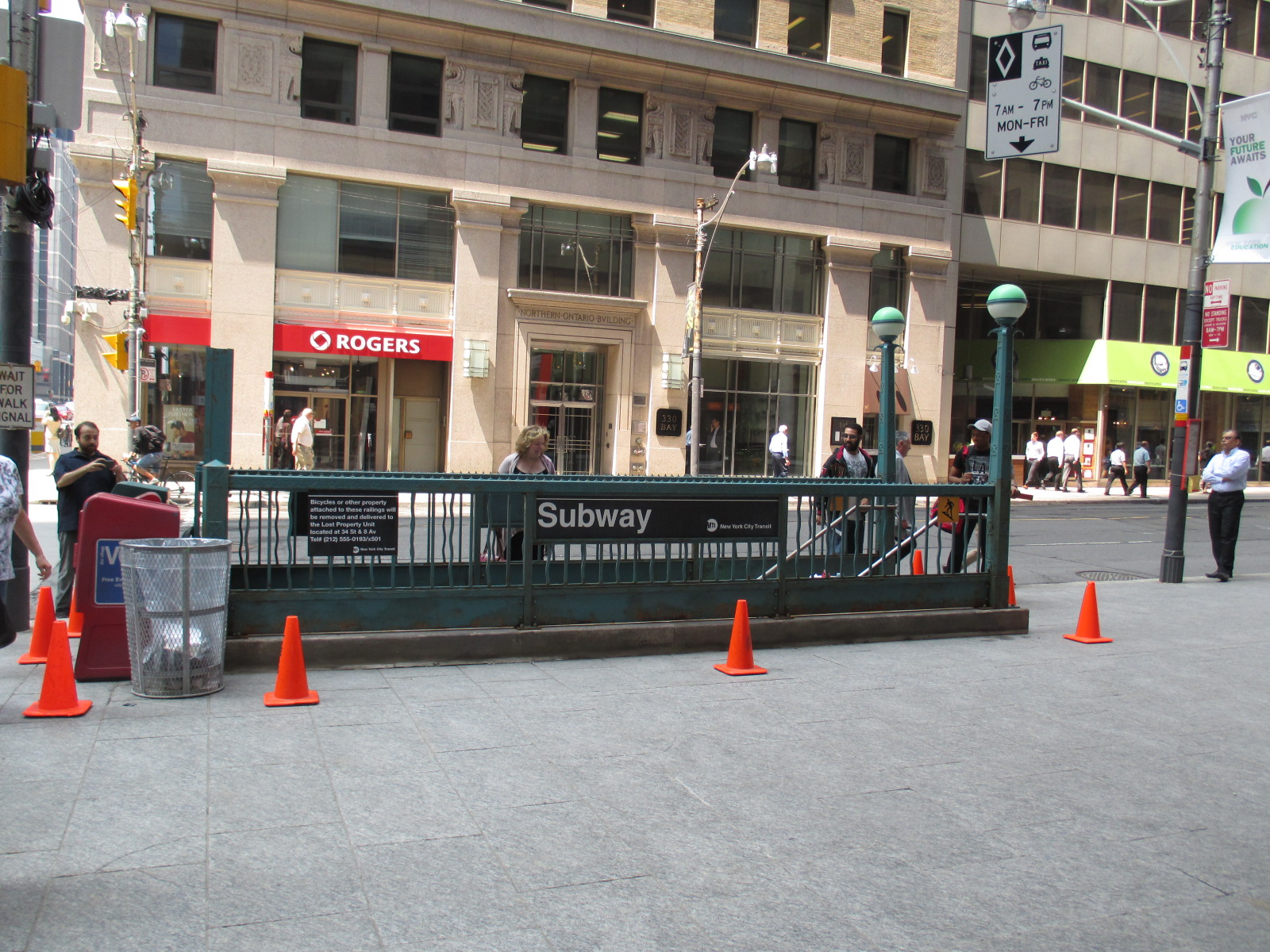
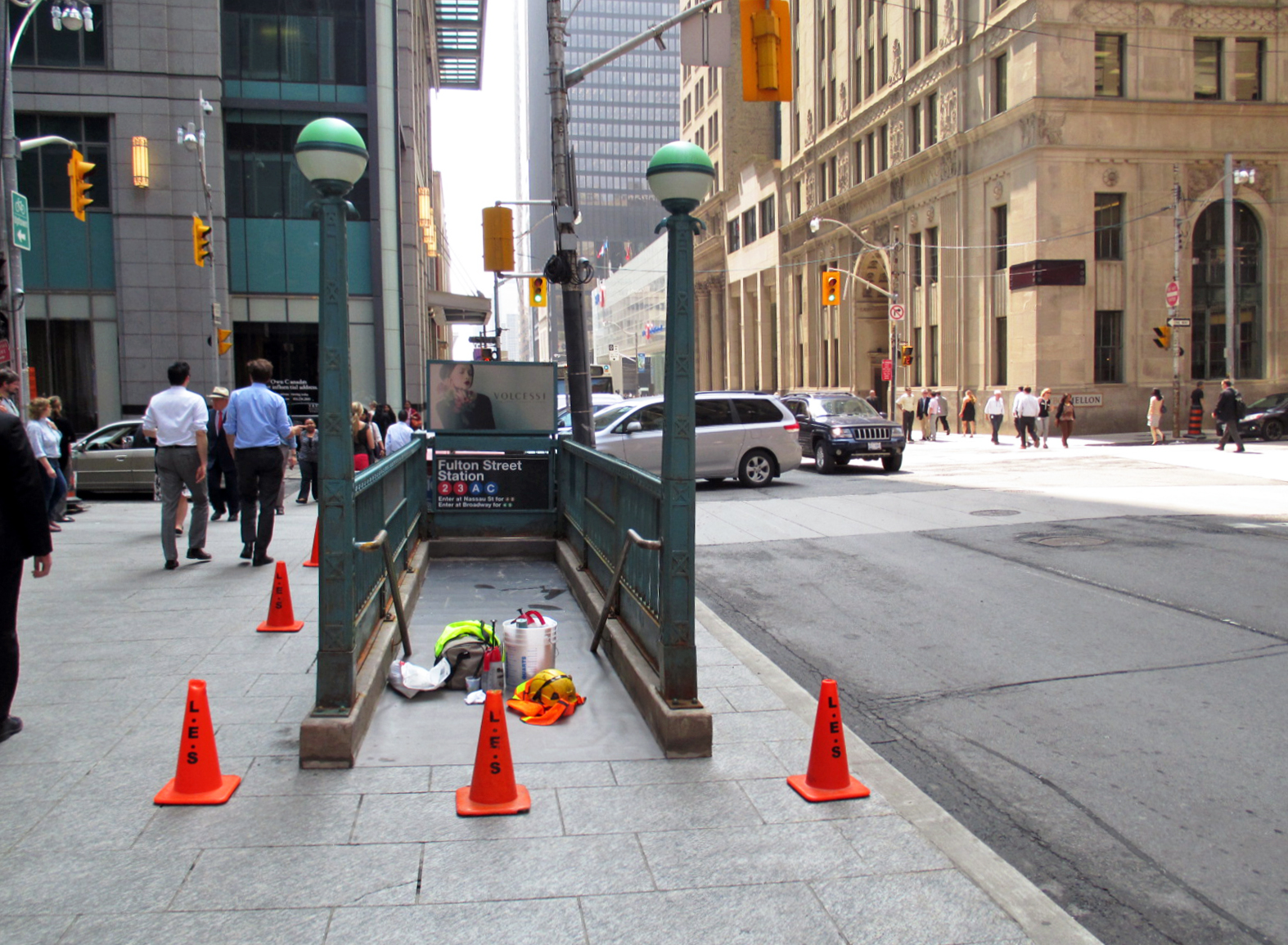
Movie prop for Pixels in downtown Toronto for a New York subway entrance

Pixels was greenlit on a production budget of $135 million, but Doug Belgrad negotiated it down to $110 million. On March 25, 2014, the Ontario Media Development Corporation confirmed the film would be shot in Toronto from May 28 to September 9 at Pinewood Toronto Studios.

Principal photography commenced in Toronto on June 2, 2014, using downtown streets decorated to resemble New York City. Certain sequences such as the Pac-Man chase happened at night, and the filmmakers would often close the streets off from traffic at 7:00 PM and redecorate them to resemble New York until it was dark enough, with filming taking place overnight. On July 29, filming took place outside Markham, Ontario. Filming also took place in the Rouge Park area, and extras were dressing in costume at Markham's Rouge Valley Mennonite Church. On August 4, Gad, Dinklage and Benson were spotted in Toronto filming scenes for the film on Bay Street, which was transformed into a city block in Washington, D.C., and littered with wrecked vehicles and giant holes in the pavement. The Ontario Government Buildings was doubled to transform into a federal office building in Washington. The actors were seen aiming at aliens, which were added later with computer-generated imagery (CGI). On August 26, filming took place in Cobourg. Filming was completed in three months, with twelve hours of shooting each day.

=== Visual effects and post-production ===
Most of the visual effects were handled by Digital Domain and Sony Pictures Imageworks alongside nine other VFX companies, all under the leadership of supervisor Matthew Butler and producer Denise Davis. Early tests began in October 2013, with most effects work starting after principal photography wrapped in September 2014 and finishing by June 2015. Video game characters would be built out of cubic voxels to resemble the low resolution pixel-based graphics from their original games, while also emitting light and having raster scan defects in its animation to make it appear as if they came from a CRT monitor. Along with the actual sprite sheets, a major inspiration to integrate the film's conceptualized character designs into the third dimension was the cabinet art, which Imageworks visual effects supervisor Daniel Kramer considered "was the intention the game creators wanted their technology to be, but the technology couldn't live up to creating that". The most complex character to model was Q*bert, who interacted the most with humans and whose head needed to appear circular despite being made out of voxels. A pivotal moment in the film is the Pac-Man sequence, where a giant Pac-Man pursues the protagonists through New York City in Mini Coopers that represent the ghosts from the origin series. The stereo team developed three-dimensional models of the main characters' faces using cyber scans of the actors.

The animation team developed voxelized and three-dimensional versions of arcade characters and elements, including Donkey Kong, Centipede and Pac-Man, to integrate them into a live-action setting. The voxelization process involved using boxes that changed per frame to mimic the pixel-based graphics, and was particularly challenging for characters with complex movements, such as Donkey Kong. Pac-Man's animation required the voxelization to allow light emission, using an extra Mini Cooper rigged with yellow light panels and generators that was driven in Toronto. Physical props, such as barrels, were constructed for key sequences to provide actors with reference points for interaction. In the Donkey Kong set, reflections on the stage and greenscreen required more digital replacements than anticipated.

=== Music ===
The film score was composed by Henry Jackman, conducted by Nick Glennie-Smith and performed by the Hollywood Studio Symphony. In June 2015, Waka Flocka Flame released a single entitled "Game On", featuring Good Charlotte, which serves as part of the film's soundtrack. Prominent contributions to the soundtrack include Cheap Trick's "Surrender" and a rendition of Queen's "We Will Rock You" remixed by Helmut VonLichten, the latter of which is featured during the Donkey Kong scenes. Additionally, a rendition of Tears for Fears' "Everybody Wants to Rule the World" is performed by Ludlow near the end of the film. Varèse Sarabande released the score soundtrack on July 24, 2015, the same day as the film's release.

== Release ==
=== Marketing ===
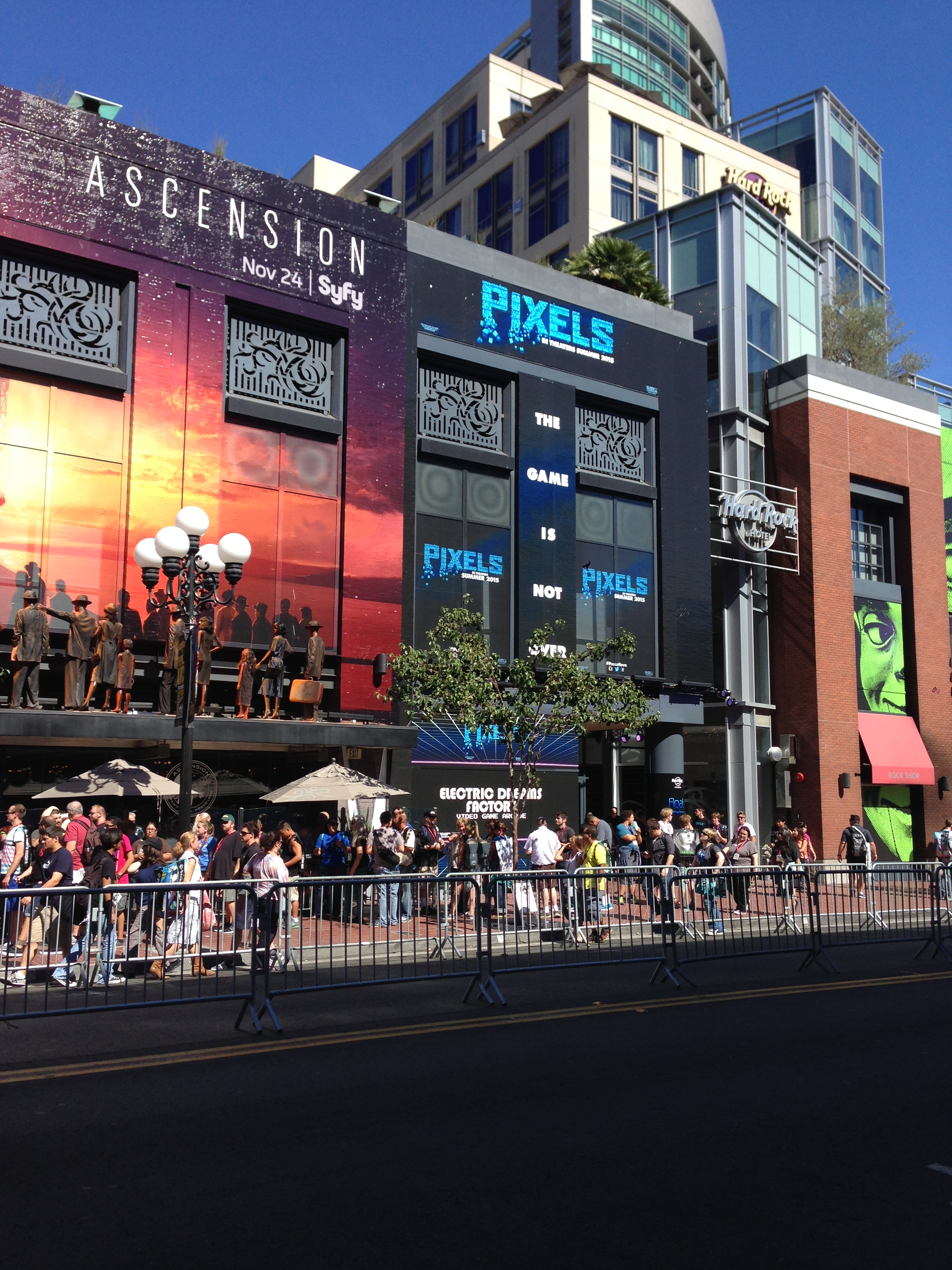
Pixels-themed building wrap in San Diego

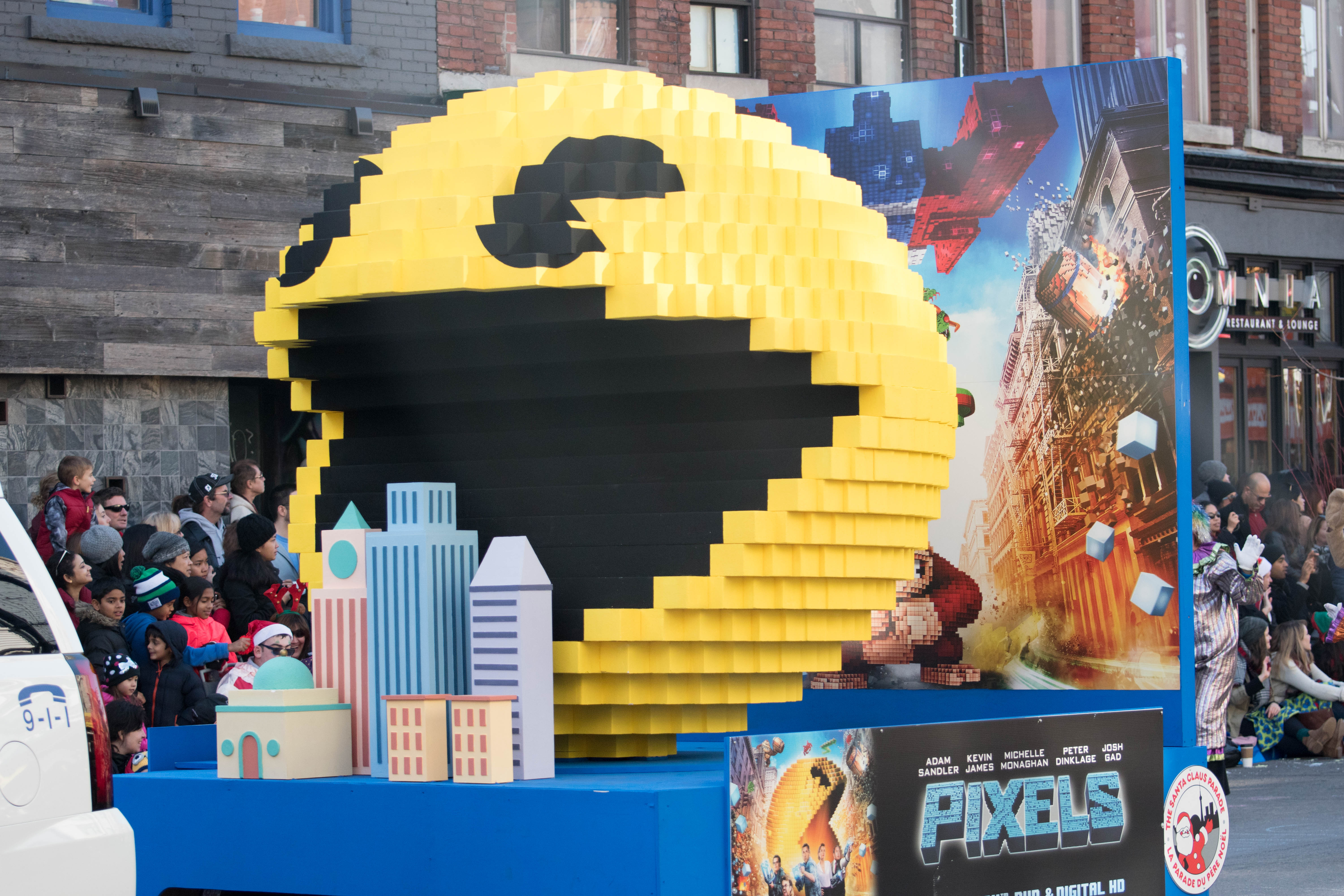
Pixels float at the 2015 Toronto Santa Claus Parade

The film's first trailer was released on March 19, 2015, and received 34.3 million global views in 24 hours, breaking Sony's previous record held by The Amazing Spider-Man 2 (22 million views in 2014). The second trailer was released on June 13, 2015. Upon the trailer's release, similarities were noted between the film and a segment of the Futurama episode "Anthology of Interest II".

Sony created a real-life "Electric Dreams Factory Arcade" with many of the arcade games featured in the film for various fan conventions, such as the 2014 San Diego Comic-Con and the 2015 Wizard World Philadelphia. In Brazil, a promotional video was released on July 2, 2015, showing Adam Sandler interacting with Monica and Jimmy Five from local comic Monica's Gang.

=== Theatrical ===
Pixels was originally scheduled to be released on May 15, 2015, but on August 12, 2014, the release date was pushed to July 24, 2015. In the United States and Canada, Pixels was the first Sony Pictures film to be released in the Dolby Vision format in Dolby Cinema.

==== Copyright takedown controversy ====
Sony Pictures hired Entura International to send Digital Millennium Copyright Act takedown notices to websites hosting user-uploaded videos of the film. The company filed DMCA takedown notices indiscriminately against several Vimeo videos containing the word "Pixels" in the title, including the 2010 short film the film is based on, the film's official trailer, a 2006 independently produced Cypriot film uploaded by the Independent Museum of Contemporary Art, a 2010 university work by a student of the Bucharest National University of Arts, a royalty-free stock footage clip and an independently produced project. The takedown notice sent by Entura stated that the works infringed a copyright they had the right to enforce; once the notice was made public, it was withdrawn.

=== Home media ===
Pixels was released on Blu-ray (3D and 2D) and DVD on October 27, 2015, by Sony Pictures Home Entertainment. This release sold $12.4 million in DVD sales and $7.4 million in Blu-ray sales.

== Reception ==
=== Box office ===
Pixels grossed $78.7 million in North America and $164.9 million in other territories for a worldwide total of $244.9 million. Reports of the production budget of the film range from $88 million to $129 million, with Sony officially confirming the cost to be $110 million. The film received tax rebates of $19 million for filming in Canada.

In the United States and Canada, Pixels opened alongside Paper Towns, Southpaw and The Vatican Tapes, and faced competition from holdovers Minions and Ant-Man, both of which were projected to earn around $20 million. It made $1.5 million from its Thursday night showings at 2,776 theaters and topped the box office on its opening day, earning $9.2 million. Through its opening weekend it grossed $24 million from 3,723 theaters, debuting at second place at the box office behind Ant-Man.

=== Critical response ===
On review aggregator Rotten Tomatoes, the film has an approval rating of 17% based on 201 reviews; the average rating is 4/10. The website's critical consensus reads, "Much like the worst arcade games from the era that inspired it, Pixels has little replay value and is hardly worth a quarter." On Metacritic, the film has a weighted average score of 27 out of 100, based on 37 critics, indicating "generally unfavorable reviews". Audiences polled by CinemaScore gave the film an average grade of "B" on an A+ to F scale.

Peter Travers of Rolling Stone gave the film one star out of four, calling it "a 3D metaphor for Hollywood's digital assault on our eyes and brains" and deeming it "relentless and exhausting". In Salon.com, Andrew O'Hehir called the film "another lazy Adam Sandler exercise in 80s Nostalgia", as well as "an overwhelmingly sad experience" characterized by "soul-sucking emptiness". Nigel Smith of The Guardian called it "casually sexist, awkwardly structured, bro-centric" and said, "Pity the poor souls who go into the comedy blockbuster thinking they've signed up to watch The Lego Movie by way of Independence Day. They'll be disappointed". Joe Neumaier of the New York Daily News gave the film no stars and wrote, "Someone please retire Adam Sandler. Pixels is the last straw for this has-been...Every joke is forced, every special effect is un-special...The dipstick Pixels is about as much fun as a joystick and not even half as smart". "It manages to achieve the weird effect of feeling overlong and choppy at the same time, like someone edited the film with a pair of garden shears," wrote Randy Cordova in The Arizona Republic.

Marjorie Baumgarten of The Austin Chronicle said the film is "flat-footed and grows tedious after the first hour" but praised the 3D effects which "enhances the action". "Everything is wrong here," wrote Megan Garber in The Atlantic Monthly, "cinematically, creatively, maybe even morally. Because Pixels is one of those bad movies that isn't just casually bad, or shoot-the-moon bad, or too-close-to-the-sun bad, or actually kind of delightfully bad. It is tediously bad." Peter Sobczynski, writing for RogerEbert.com, called the premise promising but the execution "abysmal". Conversely, Katie Walsh of the Chicago Tribune was more positive, saying "despite [its] unfortunate shortcomings, Pixels has its funny and fresh moments, thanks in large part to the supporting comic actors and inventive special effects".

=== Accolades ===
Accolades received by Pixels
Award	Date of ceremony	Category	Recipient(s)	Result	Ref.
Artios Awards	January 22, 2015	Outstanding Achievement in Casting – Animation Feature	Brad Gilmore	Nominated	
Golden Raspberry Awards	February 27, 2016	Worst Picture	Pixels	Nominated	
Golden Raspberry Awards	February 27, 2016	Worst Actor	Adam Sandler (Note: Also for The Cobbler)	Nominated	
Golden Raspberry Awards	February 27, 2016	Worst Supporting Actor	Josh Gad (Note: Also for The Wedding Ringer)	Nominated	
Golden Raspberry Awards	February 27, 2016	Worst Supporting Actor	Kevin James	Nominated	
Golden Raspberry Awards	February 27, 2016	Worst Supporting Actress	Michelle Monaghan	Nominated	
Golden Raspberry Awards	February 27, 2016	Worst Screenplay	Tim Herlihy and Timothy Dowling (based on a work by Patrick Jean)	Nominated	
Golden Trailer Awards	May 4, 2016	Golden Fleece	Pixels	Won	
Houston Film Critics Society Awards	January 9, 2016	Worst Film	Pixels	Won	
Teen Choice Awards	August 16, 2015	Choice Summer Movie Star: Male	Adam Sandler	Nominated	
