= Anthology of Interest II =

- Futurama episode
- Episode no.: Season 3 Episode 18
- Directed by: Bret Haaland
- Written by: Lewis Morton (I, Meatbag); David X. Cohen (Raiders of the Lost Arcade); Jason Gorbett & Scott Kirby (Wizzin)
- Production code: 3ACV18
- Original air date: January 6, 2002

Guest appearance
- Kath Soucie as Cubert Farnsworth

Episode features
- Opening caption: Hey, TiVo! Suggest this!
- Opening cartoon: "A Close Call" (1929)

Episode chronology
← Previous "A Pharaoh to Remember"	Next → "Roswell That Ends Well"
- Futurama season 3

"Anthology of Interest II" is the eighteenth episode in the third season of the American animated television series Futurama, and the 50th episode of the series overall. It originally aired on the Fox network in the United States on January 6, 2002. This episode, as well as the earlier "Anthology of Interest I", serves to showcase three "imaginary" stories.

== Plot ==
Professor Farnsworth hauls out his What-If Machine again, fine-tunes it, and the crew takes a look at three alternative realities.

=== I, Meatbag ===
Bender asks what would happen if he were human. In the simulation, Professor Farnsworth invents a process of reverse fossilization, which can turn robots and machines into organic life forms. He uses his process on Bender, who is transformed into a human. After a short period of adaptation, Bender's self-control is overwhelmed by his new senses of taste and touch, and he goes on a binge of eating, smoking, partying, and drinking alcohol.

At the Nobel Prize awards ceremony one week later, the Professor presents Bender, who is now morbidly obese and in terrible health. The committee initially condemns Farnsworth, but Bender begs them to consider his lifestyle. This inspires the scientists to spend the night in a state of wild hedonism. The following day, the hungover committee awards Bender the Nobel Prize in Chemistry but discovers that he died shortly after the party began. The Planet Express crew then sadly roll away Bender's corpse.

=== Raiders of the Lost Arcade ===
Fry asks to see a world that is more like a video game. In the simulation, the President of Earth Richard Nixon is about to sign a treaty with the Nintendian ambassador Kong of the planet Nintendu 64, but Kong attacks Nixon and a state of war erupts. Due to his extensive knowledge of video games from the 20th century, Fry is brought into the Milatari headquarters in Washington, D.C. and introduced to Milatari general Colin Pac-Man. Before Fry can impart his wisdom to Milatari, the Nintendians launch an attack on the city, and they are forced into the escape tunnels to New New York, which resemble a Pac-Man board.

They emerge outside the Planet Express building, where the Nintendian invaders, led by Omicronian ruler Lrrr, are laying waste to New New York. Fry situates himself at the controls of a rolling anti-aircraft artillery platform and begins destroying the Nintendian ship, but Colin is killed during the battle and Fry is unable to destroy Lrrr's Nintendian ship. The Nintendians emerge and demand "a million allowances' worth of quarters" to do their laundry. The crew initially refuses, but the two sides reach a compromise in which the Nintendians will throw their laundry in with Earth's.

=== Wizzin' ===
Leela asks what would have happened if she had found her true home. However, when the lever is pulled to start the simulation, it hits Leela on the head and knocks her unconscious, causing her to dream a parody of The Wizard of Oz with Leela as Dorothy, Nibbler as Toto, Amy as Glinda the Good Witch, Mom as the Wicked Witch of the West, Fry as the Scarecrow, Bender as the Tin Man, Zoidberg as the Cowardly Lion, Hermes as the Guard and Professor Fansworth as the Wizard.

Leela and Nibbler, while riding in the Planet Express ship, are taken by a tornado to Oz. The ship's landing gear lands on the Wicked Witch of the East, killing her. Leela takes the witch's magic boots from her corpse and puts them on since it is hard to find footwear in her size. She asks Amy for help getting back home, and Amy tells her that only the Professor at the Emerald Laboratory can send her home. Leela is joined in her quest by Fry, Bender, and Zoidberg. Wicked Witch Mom captures them all and asks Leela to be her daughter. Leela happily agrees, but when Bender opens a celebratory bottle of champagne, the spilled liquid causes Mom to melt into nothing. They resume their journey to the Emerald Laboratory, where the Professor tells Leela to click her bootheels together and wish to be sent back home. Instead, she uses them to become a witch, turning Fry, Bender, and the Professor into toads. However, a toilet overflow in the upstairs bathroom (caused by Zoidberg's use of it) leaks through the ceiling and onto Leela, causing her to melt. She wakes up to find Bender splashing water in her face and berates the crew for ruining her wonderful dream. The Professor is disappointed to see Leela alive, as he had intended to harvest her organs.

== Cultural references ==
=== I, Meatbag ===
In a split-second establishing shot of New New York before the Professor's press conference, the towers of the World Trade Center are seen. This episode aired on January 6, 2002, about 4 months after the towers were destroyed. The song that Bender becomes infatuated with as a human is "Conga" by Gloria Estefan. The title of the segment is a nod to the Isaac Asimov collection of short stories I, Robot. Bender's white shirt and blue pants resemble that of Homer Simpson, while his blonde hair color, womanzing and also his Wooooo sound resemble that of wrestling legend Ric Flair.

=== Raiders of the Lost Arcade ===
A parody of the game Space Invaders

The "Raiders of the Lost Arcade" segment is a "non-stop barrage of game references" with jokes and allusions referencing a wide array of classic video games. The title is a reference to the 1981 film Raiders of the Lost Ark. The segment starts off with a sequence from Asteroids. "Ambassador Kong" is a reference to the arcade game Donkey Kong, as is Italy's ambassador to the United Nations being Mario. The maze which the characters run through is a homage to the Pac-Man series. The crew exits the maze through a warp pipe from Super Mario Bros. The Nintendians' fleet is composed of ships based on the aliens from the Space Invaders series, which move in the same pattern as those in the video game ("Drop down, increase speed, and reverse direction!"). Fry plays to the accompaniment of a cassette tape of "Tom Sawyer" by Rush. The planet Nintendu 64 is a reference to the game console Nintendo 64. When the Milatari HQ is first shown, the green tank from Battlezone is driving past. When the characters walk through the HQ, they go past doors labelled Moon Patrol and Missile Command. As the Nintendians (Lrrr, Donkey Kong, a Berzerk robot, a Robotron brain, BurgerTime's Mr. Egg, and Q*bert) exit the landed ship, one of them says the phrase "All your base are belong to us", a phrase originating from Zero Wing.

=== Wizzin' ===
The majority of the plot is a direct parody of the 1939 film The Wizard of Oz, with Leela taking the place of Dorothy, Amy as the Good Witch of the North, Fry as the Scarecrow, Bender as the Tin Man, Zoidberg as the Cowardly Lion, Professor Farnsworth as the Wizard and Mom as the Wicked Witch of the West. When Leela first exits the spaceship, a parody of the NBC peacock logo is seen spreading its feathers. While skipping Fry says “I got to pull over and take The Wiz,” in reference to The Wiz, a 1978 remake of the original film. Fry attempts to scare a crow by a reading an excerpt of the Stephen King book Christine.

== Reception ==
In 2006, IGN.com ranked this episode as the series' twelfth best, with "Anthology of Interest I" at number 13, in their list of the "Top 25 Futurama episodes". Zack Handlen of The A.V. Club gave the episode a B. In its initial airing, the episode received a Nielsen rating of 4.5, placing it 62nd among primetime shows for the week of December 31, 2001 – January 6, 2002.

== See also ==
- Pixels (2015 film), a film with a storyline similar to "Raiders of the Lost Arcade"
