= Etopia Centre for Arts & Technology =

Public multimedia art exhibit in Zaragoza, Spain

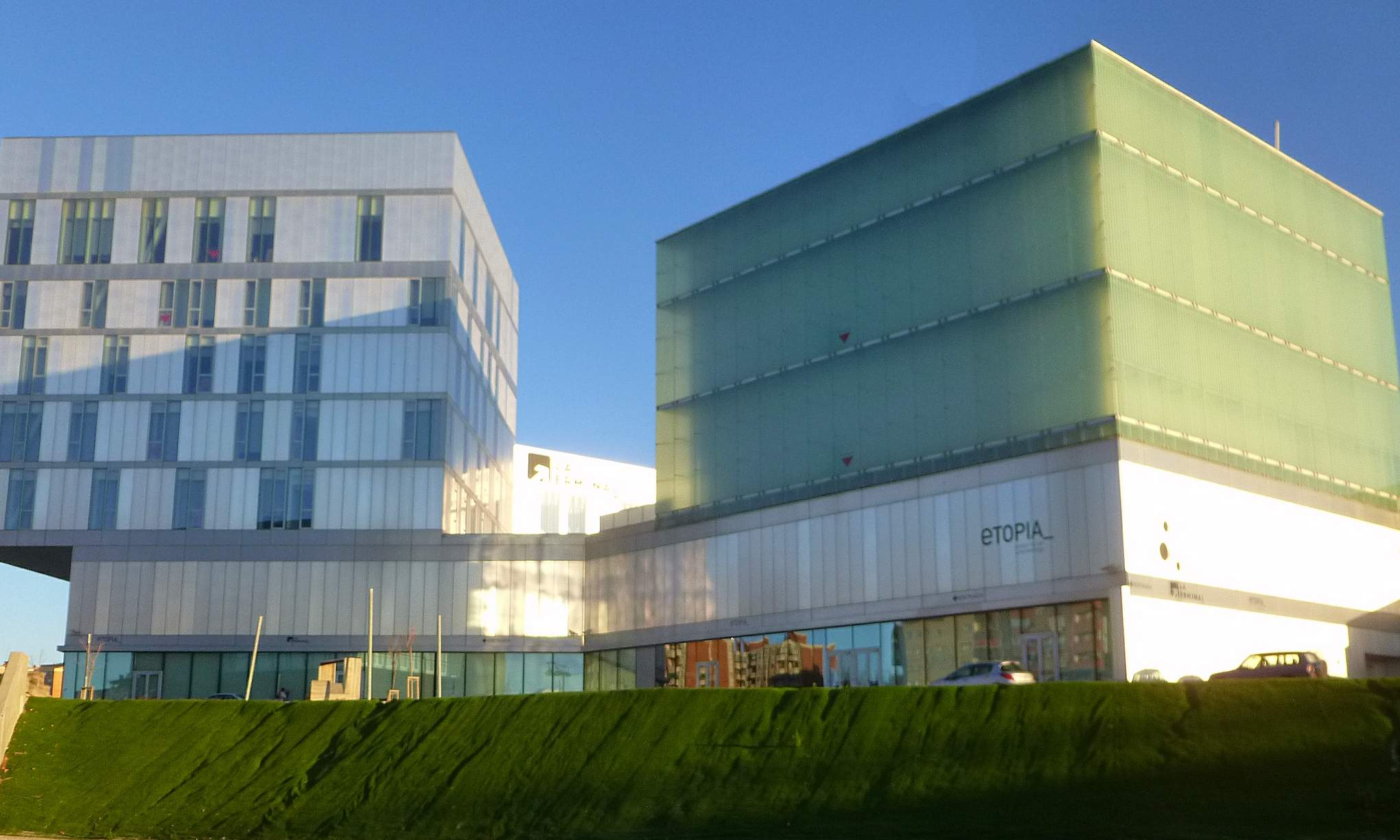
- Interactive map of Etopia Centre for Arts & Technology
- Address: Zaragoza, Aragon; Spain
- Coordinates: 41°39′34.43″N 0°54′26″W
- Type: Design space, exhibition centre

Construction
- Opened: 2013; 13 years ago

Website
- etopia.es

Etopia Centre for Arts & Technology is a public facility opened in 2013 within the Digital Mile area in the city of Zaragoza (Aragon, Spain) designed to house and promote projects in the fields of multimedia, art, video games and design. With an area of more than 16,000 m^{2} it works as a center for contemporary culture exhibition, production and training space in the intersection of art and technology.

Etopia's «Media Facade» is a large scale urban screen of two sections of 20 meters wide, aimed at displaying visual projects developed in the center. The inaugural exhibition was held on November 9, 2013, as part of the V Ibero-American Congress of Culture, featuring the work by the artists Ignacio Alcántara (Dominican Republic), Brisa MP (Chile), Yamil Burguener (Argentina), Arcangel Constantini (Mexico), Alejo Duque (Colombia), Alvaro Pastor (Peru), Hernan Bula, Laura Colombo, Mauro Paez and Juan Sorrentino (Argentina), together with Javier Galán curator of the project, and Néstor Lizalde as technical coordinator. Currently the «Media Facade» is a vehicle to show the creativity of artists and developers.
