= King Kong (franchise) =

American media franchise

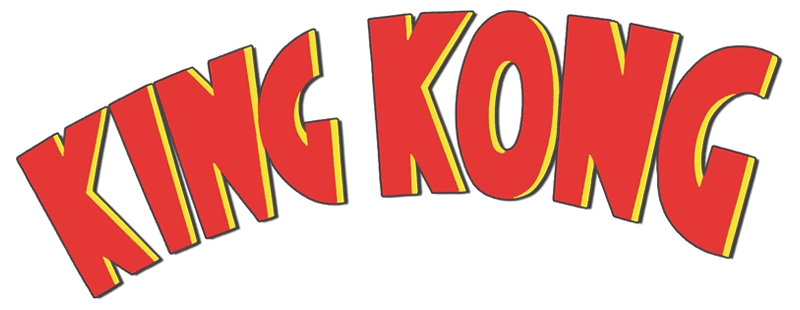
- Logo used in marketing materials for the original 1933 film
- Created by: Merian C. Cooper
- Original work: King Kong (1933)
- Owners: Warner Bros. (Note: Ownership over the RKO Radio Pictures-produced 1933 films King Kong and Son of Kong were passed on to Warner Bros. (via Turner Entertainment Co.) Warner Bros. also owns The Mighty Kong (1998), Kong: Skull Island (2017), Godzilla vs. Kong (2021), and Godzilla x Kong: The New Empire (2024), with Toho retaining distribution rights to the latter two films in Japan); Universal Pictures (Note: Universal owns the 2005 remake King Kong, Kong-related theme park attractions, and the copyright to the American versions of the Toho-produced films King Kong vs. Godzilla and King Kong Escapes; Toho retains exclusive distribution rights in the Far East for their productions. Universal retains theatrical distribution rights of Godzilla vs. Kong, and Godzilla x Kong: The New Empire in Mexican, Australian, New Zealand and Hong Kong. This is part of a deal with Warner Bros. Pictures following the closure of their Mexican and Hong Kong distribution branches, and cutting ties with Roadshow Films in Australia and New Zealand.); StudioCanal (Note: Ownership over the 1976 remake King Kong and its 1986 sequel King Kong Lives were inherited by StudioCanal after they absorbed De Laurentiis Entertainment Group. Paramount Pictures retains domestic distribution of the 1976 remake.)
- Years: 1933–present

Print publications
- Comics: Full list

Films and television
- Film: 13 films; 1933–present
- Television series: Full list

Theatrical presentations
- Musical: King Kong (2013)

Miscellaneous
- Crossover series: Monsterverse

King Kong is an American monster media franchise that consists of thirteen films, as well as television shows, novels, comic books, video games, attractions, and other merchandise. The franchise is centered on King Kong, a giant ape living on a primordial island inhabited by prehistoric creatures. The original film King Kong was co-directed by Merian C. Cooper (creator of the character) and Ernest B. Schoedsack and was released on March 2, 1933; it was a box office success, despite opening during the Great Depression. The film's stop motion effects by Willis H. O'Brien revolutionized special effects, leaving a lasting impact on the film industry worldwide.

Twelve films have followed since the franchise's 1933 debut, with Kong typically serving as a benevolent and, at times, violent protagonist. Ownership over each film varies since Kong was licensed to various studios, but the original 1933 film and its sequel were produced and owned by RKO Radio Pictures. The films were inherited by Warner Bros. (via Turner Entertainment Co.) in 1996.

The franchise has had several hiatuses and revivals, and it has inspired other genre films during intervals, such as Mighty Joe Young, The Beast from 20,000 Fathoms, Creature from the Black Lagoon, Godzilla, Mothra and Jurassic Park.

== History ==
Live-action and animated variants of King Kong between 1933–2021

=== 1930s ===
In 1933, RKO Pictures produced and released King Kong; it became a box office success despite opening during the Great Depression, earning $90,000 in its first four days. The film's success spawned a sequel nine months later, Son of Kong, as well as what became a multimedia franchise, spanning remakes, reboots, books, videos games, attractions, parodies and references.

The film grossed $10 million at the box office and earned an additional $2.5 million when it was re-released in 1952. The film revolutionized special effects, specifically stop motion, that left a long lasting impact in the film industry worldwide, with effects animator Willis H. O'Brien largely credited for pioneering the medium. King Kong (1933) is widely regarded by critics and journalists as a masterpiece and a signature facet of American cinema, and is cited as one of the greatest monster films ever made. King Kong (1933) was selected by the National Film Registry for preservation.

=== 1960s ===
In the early 1960s, O'Brien developed a story outline titled King Kong vs. Frankenstein, supplemented with water-color illustrations and sketches, in the hopes of igniting interest for a potential production in color. Impressed with O'Brien's pitch, RKO attorney Daniel O'Shea granted O'Brien permission to use the character and introduced him to independent film producer John Beck to help secure studio funding. Despite hiring George Worthing Yates to adapt O'Brien's outline into a full screenplay (retitled as King Kong vs. Prometheus, in reference to the original Mary Shelley book) and meeting with several studios and directors, Beck failed to sell the project in Hollywood and reached out to foreign studios.

Beck succeeded in striking a deal with Toho Co., Ltd., the producers behind Godzilla (1954). However, Toho was mostly interested in licensing King Kong from RKO and Beck rather than acquiring O'Brien's story. As a result, Frankenstein/Prometheus was replaced with Godzilla and the project was redeveloped as King Kong vs. Godzilla. Beck's deal with Toho was done without O'Brien's knowledge or consent. His representative prepared a lawsuit (presumably against Beck) for unauthorized use of O'Brien's ideas in the film. However, the lawsuit was dropped due to attorney fees, and O'Brien died on November 8, 1962.

Unlike King Kong (1933), the special effects in Godzilla were accomplished with suitmation and miniature sets, also known as tokusatsu. King Kong was portrayed by Shoichi Hirose and Godzilla portrayed by Haruo Nakajima; stop motion was also used in a few brief scenes.

Toho theatrically released King Kong vs. Godzilla on August 11, 1962, in Japan and it was a box office success, having sold 11.2 million tickets during its initial theatrical run. It earned ¥352 million ($972,000) in distribution rental earnings. The film became the second-highest-grossing Japanese-produced film in history upon its release and was the fourth-highest-grossing film released in Japan that year, as well as Toho's second-biggest release.

Because Toho was so eager to acquire King Kong, they had agreed to let Beck retain exclusive distribution rights (theatrical and television) for the United States, Canada, Alaska, the United Kingdom, and Israel, while Toho retained exclusive distribution for the Far East. Beck's contract also granted him the right to produce his own version. Beck commissioned a heavily localized version with new footage using American actors and replacing Akira Ifukube's score with stock music from Universal Pictures' library. Beck sold his localized version to Universal International, who made a deal to retain copyrights to the American version for 40 years.

The American version of King Kong vs. Godzilla was released in the United States on June 26, 1963. The Japanese version remained unavailable officially outside of Japan until 2019, when American distributor The Criterion Collection included both Japanese and American versions in a Blu-ray set collecting the Shōwa era Godzilla films.

In 1966, American studio Rankin/Bass Animated Entertainment acquired the rights from RKO to produce an animated series and a new live-action film. A joint venture between Rankin/Bass and Japanese studio Toei Animation, The King Kong Show premiered on ABC in September 1966. Around that time, Rankin/Bass made a deal with Toho to co-produced their King Kong film that would have been promotionally tied to The King Kong Show. Toho presented a script titled Operation Robinson Crusoe: King Kong vs. Ebirah, but Rankin/Bass vetoed the script and Toho proceeded without Rankin/Bass; King Kong was replaced with Godzilla and the film was redeveloped as Ebirah, Horror of the Deep.

In September 1966, Toho had sent Rankin/Bass a proposed synopsis for a new film titled King Kong Escapes, which was loosely based on The King Kong Show; though some elements from Operation Robinson Crusoe: King Kong vs. Ebirah remained such as over-the-top villains from an unnamed nation, illegal production of fuel for nuclear weapons, and scenes in the South Seas. The proposal was accepted and filming began in spring 1967, with Haruo Nakajima playing King Kong via suitmation. Toho theatrically released King Kong Escapes on July 22, 1967, in Japan but failed to match the box office success of King Kong vs. Godzilla. Universal Pictures released an English dubbed version in the United States the following year; similar to what they had done with King Kong vs. Godzilla, Universal made a deal to retain the copyright of the American version for 40 years.

=== 1970s–1980s ===
Accounts vary as to the genesis of the 1976 remake. Producer Dino De Laurentiis has claimed it was his idea to remake King Kong after seeing a poster of the 1933 film in his daughter's room. Michael Eisner, then-vice president of ABC, equally claimed to have conceived the idea of a remake in December 1974 after watching the 1933 film on television, and casually mentioned the idea to Sidney Sheinberg, then-president and CEO of MCA Inc. and Universal Pictures, and Sheinberg also mentioned the idea to Barry Diller, then-president of Paramount Pictures. Sheinberg and Diller soon began developing their own King Kong remakes simultaneously, both unaware of the other's project. Diller hired De Laurentiis to produce on behalf of Paramount, while Sheinberg hired Hunt Stromberg Jr. to produce for Universal. On April 15, 1975, Universal's attorney Arnold Shane and De Laurentiis met with RKO's attorney Daniel O'Shea to negotiate in acquiring the rights; Shane and De Laurentiis were unaware of each other's appointment. Despite not signing documents, both parties left believing they had secured the rights for their respected studios. However, Paramount had signed their deal with RKO the following month and soon learned about Universal's own film after they announced Joseph Sargent to direct and Bo Goldman to write the script, titled The Legend of King Kong.

Universal and Paramount soon engaged in litigation. Universal insisted that a verbal agreement was made with RKO, demanded $25 million in damages from De Laurentiis and RKO, and asserted that the material was in public domain by then since Universal published a novelization of the King Kong story in the 1930s. De Laurentiis countersued for copyright infringement, demanding $90 million in damages and pushed his film into production while also publishing ads that jabbed at Universal (e.g. "There Still is Only One King Kong"). In January 1976, negotiations were made to potentially have both studios co-produce a single film and share profits, but De Laurentiis rejected Universal's proposal of using their script and controlling the merchandise. Litigation ended that same month after De Laurentiis agreed to pay an undisclosed percentage for Universal's cancelled film, with Universal vowing to produce their own King Kong film at an undetermined date.

Carlo Rambaldi lead an effects team that built Kong's giant hand and a 40 foot tall robot of Kong, its construction overseen by Glen Robinson. Like the Toho films, an ape-suit was used to bring Kong to life, with special make-up effects artist Rick Baker portraying the character. The 40-foot robot cost roughly $2 million, while the giant hand and suit cost an additional $400,000, and a full-sized static Kong made of styrofoam, used for one scene, cost $300,000. The production was a rushed venture since the studio set the film's release date for December 1976 and De Laurentiis' persistence to beat Universal. As a result, delays occurred due to props and mechanics malfunctioning; two full-scale right hands produced by mistake; director John Guillermin's tyrant-like behavior on-set; the budget inflating to $24 million and marketing costs of $10 million, figures unheard of at the time. Paramount theatrically released King Kong on December 17, 1976, and grossed $90 million. Despite mixed reviews unfavorably comparing the remake to the original, the film won an Academy Award for Best Visual Effects, shared with Logan's Run.

In 1977, De Laurentiis stated that a sequel to the 1976 remake would "definitely" be produced. However, development on a sequel was impaired by the remake's disappointing box office results and legal complications over the ownership of the King Kong character. Writer Steven Pressfield stated that various scripts were written that he described as "embarrassing". Despite initially skeptical of a female Kong, De Laurentiis ultimately approved of Pressfield's and Ronald Shusett pitch of Kong put in a respirator and restored with an artificial heart. Guillermin returned to direct the sequel after finances collapsed for a film adaptation of Tai-Pan with Sean Connery. The film was announced in October 1985 and filming began in April 1986 in Tennessee for a December release later that year. King Kong Lives was theatrically released on December 19, 1986, by De Laurentiis Entertainment Group and was met with a poor response. The film flopped at the box office, grossing $4.7 million in the United States and Canada, and was panned by critics.

=== 1990s ===
In 1993, Toho had considered remaking King Kong vs. Godzilla, due to that film being their most successful Godzilla/Kong film to date. However, Toho concluded that re-acquiring the rights to King Kong would prove difficult and instead considered using the cyborg Mechani-Kong, seen in The King Kong Show and Toho's King Kong Escapes. Effects director Kōichi Kawakita regaled an idea inspired by Fantastic Voyage where Mechani-Kong would have injected people inside Godzilla's body to battle the beast internally while Mechani-Kong battled Godzilla externally. Kawakita stated that the concept would have explored different worlds inside Godzilla. However, Toho walked back on using Mechani-Kong since the character bore a likeness to King Kong and thus required obtaining the rights. Mechani-Kong was replaced with Mechagodzilla and the film was redeveloped as Godzilla vs. Mechagodzilla II.

In 1995, Universal Pictures offered filmmaker Peter Jackson a chance to direct a remake of King Kong, after being impressed with Jackson's The Frighteners. Licensing the character from RKO and Time Warner was no longer an issue because the character of "Kong" fell into public domain by that point. Jackson initially turned down the offer but reneged on his decision after fearing that the remake would fail under a different director. Around that time, Jackson was attached to direct live-action film adaptations of The Hobbit and The Lord of the Rings but proceeded with King Kong due to producer Harvey Weinstein taking too long to acquire the rights.

To placate Weinstein's anger, Jackson brokered a co-financing/co-distributing deal with Miramax for King Kong that benefited all parties. Pre-production commenced with filmmaker Robert Zemeckis on board as executive producer and Universal approved the script co-written by Jackson and his wife Fran Walsh, with filming planned to commence in 1997 for a potential 1998 release. However, Universal halted progress in January 1997 after growing concern over competition from the then-upcoming releases of TriStar's Godzilla and Mighty Joe Young, both released in 1998, the latter by Miramax's parent company, Disney. Universal aborted King Kong the following month, despite Wētā FX and Wētā Workshop having already designed six months worth of pre-production, and Jackson reverted to helm The Lord of the Rings trilogy. Years later, Jackson, and his frequent collaborator Christian Rivers, had noted a similar tone between Jackson's unused script and Universal's 1999 remake of The Mummy.

In 1998, Warner Bros. released The Mighty Kong direct-to-video. An animated musical remake of the 1933 film, it features the voices of Dudley Moore, Jodi Benson, Bill Sage, Jason Gray-Stanford, and Richard Newman. The film received negative reviews and is placed in the low-tier end of most ranking lists of King Kong films.

=== 2000s ===
In response to the success of Columbia TriStar Television's animated series Godzilla: The Series, BKN International produced Kong: The Animated Series and ran on syndicated television between 2000 and 2001. The series is a direct sequel to the 1933 film and focuses on a new Kong cloned from the DNA of both the 1933 Kong and a young man named Jason and as a result, Jason is able to link with Kong via a special device in moments of crisis. The series generated two direct-to-video animated films, Kong: King of Atlantis (2005) and Kong: Return to the Jungle (2006).

After the success of The Lord of the Rings films, The Fellowship of the Ring and The Two Towers, Universal approached Jackson in early 2003 during post-production on The Return of the King about reviving his King Kong remake. In March 2003, Universal scheduled a 2005 release date and Philippa Boyens was hired to rewrite Jackson's and Walsh's 1996 script, but Jackson began to work on a new script in October 2003 that was closer to the 1933 film after being dissatisfied with the 1996 script. They included unused elements from James Ashmore Creelman's script of the 1933 film, such as the lost spider-pit scene. Delos W. Lovelace's 1932 novelization was also a source of inspiration. Weta Workshop and Weta Digital began to work immediately on King Kong after the completion of The Return of the King and Jackson had brought back the crew that worked with him on The Lord of the Rings trilogy. Filming began in September 2004, with Andy Serkis portraying Kong via motion-capture acting. Universal theatrically released King Kong on December 13, 2005, to generally positive reviews, with the film appearing in several top ten lists for 2005. The film received four Academy Award nominations, for Visual Effects, Sound Mixing, Sound Editing, and Production Design, winning all but the last. Jackson had also directed a recreation of the lost spider pit sequence that was featured on the 2005 DVD release of the 1933 film.

=== 2010s–present ===
==== Monsterverse ====
In 2013, Jackson and producer Mary Parent had intended to produce Skull Island, a direct sequel to his 2005 remake and handpicked then up-and-coming director Adam Wingard to direct it. However, when Legendary Pictures took over the project and redeveloped it as a prequel, Jackson and Wingard dropped out but Parent remained; Parent eventually became Legendary's production chief.

In July 2014, Legendary announced the film at San Diego Comic-Con's Hall H with Max Borenstein (writer of Legendary's 2014 Godzilla film) to write the script. Legendary initially targeted a November 4, 2016 release and had offered Joe Cornish to direct it. Around that time, Jackson expressed interest in seeing Guillermo del Toro direct the film. In September 2014, Legendary announced Jordan Vogt-Roberts as the director, with Tom Hiddleston leading the film. In September 2015, Legendary moved the film, retitled Kong: Skull Island, from Universal to Warner Bros. to unite the King Kong and Godzilla properties under one studio. In October 2015, Legendary officially announced their plans for a shared cinematic franchise between King Kong and Godzilla that would culminate in a Godzilla vs. Kong film, at the time slated for a 2020 release. In January 2017, Legendary's Godzilla–Kong series was revealed as the Monsterverse, after it was announced that Legendary founder Thomas Tull would resign but remain as producer on the Monsterverse films.

Inspired by Heart of Darkness and Apocalypse Now, Borenstein had originally envisioned a war film that began in the Vietnam War and jumped to the present day; however, Legendary rejected this idea. Borenstein then wrote a draft set in 1917 while retaining the Apocalypse Now concept. That version saw Hiddleston playing a character leading a rescue mission into Skull Island to find his brother, who came to the island in search of a cure-all serum. After Vogt-Roberts joined the film, he liked Borenstein's original Vietname-era pitch and convinced Legendary to set the film near the end of the Vietnam war. For Kong's design, Vogt-Roberts took the character back the look of the 1933 iteration, wanting him to look straightforward yet iconic enough that a child could draw him, and wanted Kong to reflect a lonely and morose God. Terry Notary portrayed Kong via performance capture, while Toby Kebbell provided additional facial work; Notary sought Serkis' blessing before accepting the role. Principal photography began in October 2015, in Hawaii and Vietnam and wrapped in March 2016.

Kong: Skull Island was released on March 10, 2017, to positive reviews, and was a box office success, grossing $566 million worldwide against a budget of $185 million. The film received a nomination for Best Visual Effects at the 90th Academy Awards.

In April 2016, writer and artist Joe DeVito sued Legendary and Warner Bros. for breach of implied contract, alleging that they had stolen ideas and concepts from pitch meetings he had with Legendary in April 2014. He claimed Legendary turned him down yet used his ideas as the basis for their film without credit or compensation and sought $3.5 million in general and punitive damages.

In March 2017, Legendary had assembled a writers room for Godzilla vs. Kong, with Terry Rossio (who had co-written an unproduced script for TriStar's Godzilla) leading a team consisting of Patrick McKay, J. D. Payne, Lindsey Beer, Cat Vasko, T. S. Nowlin, Jack Paglen, and J. Michael Straczynski. At that time, Wingard had a general meeting with Parent, who recalled that Jackson had approved of Wingard and was announced as the director of Godzilla vs. Kong in May 2017.

Filming for Godzilla vs. Kong began in November 2018 in Hawaii, Australia, and Hong Kong and wrapped in April 2019. Allan Henry provided the performance capture for Kong, while animation supervisor Eric Petey provided Kong's full body performance and facial capture for the ocean battle sequence. The film endured several delays, largely due to the COVID-19 pandemic, but was finally released internationally on March 24, 2021 and on March 31, 2021 in the United States; the latter which saw a concurrent release in theaters and on HBO Max. The film received generally positive reviews and became a box office and streaming hit during the pandemic; it became the most successful launch item in HBO Max's history until it was overtaken by Mortal Kombat. The film grossed $470 million worldwide against a break-even point of $330 million, and became the most pirated film of 2021.

In January 2021, Legendary announced an animated series titled Skull Island. A joint-venture between Legendary Television, Tractor Pants Productions, Powerhouse Animation Studios, and Netflix Animation, the series was released on June 22, 2023, on Netflix. In March 2025, Legendary Comics announced a partnership with Titan Comics to expand Skull Island into a comic series titled Return to Skull Island, slated for June 4, 2025.

Due to the success of Godzilla vs. Kong, Legendary announced a sequel in March 2022, scheduled to commence filming later that same year. In May 2022, it was announced that Wingard would return to direct and that Dan Stevens had been cast in the lead. Wingard and Stevens had previously worked together on The Guest. Filming began in July 2022 in Gold Coast, Queensland, and finished in November 2022. Allan Henry provided the performance capture for both the Skar King and Kong, reprising his role from Godzilla vs. Kong. In April 2023, Legendary released a teaser trailer revealing the film's official title as Godzilla x Kong: The New Empire. The film was theatrically released on March 29, 2024. Due to the film's success, Legendary announced in May 2024 that a follow-up is in development and would be written by David Callaham.

In January 2024, Kong briefly appeared in the finale of the television series Monarch: Legacy of Monsters. The character's role would further be expanded on in the series' second season.

Due to the success of Godzilla x Kong: The New Empire, Legendary announced in May 2024 that a sequel, titled Godzilla x Kong: Supernova, had entered development and would be written by David Callaham. The following week, Legendary announced that Wingard would not return to direct due to scheduling conflicts, but had expressed interest in having Wingard return. In June 2024, Legendary announced Grant Sputore (director of I Am Mother) as the new director and that the film would be released on March 26, 2027. Pre-production began in January 2025, with performers being cast such as Kaitlyn Dever, Jack O'Connell, Delroy Lindo, Dan Stevens (reprises his role from the previous film), Matthew Modine, Alycia Debnam-Carey, and Sam Neill.

==== Other projects ====
In 2016, Netflix released the animated series Kong: King of the Apes; a joint venture between 41 Entertainment and Avi Arad, the series ran for two seasons.

In April 2017, MarVista Entertainment and IM Global announced their own live-action King Kong project for television; written by Jonathan Penner and Stacy Title, the series is to be based on DeVito's materials, approved by the Cooper estate.

In August 2022, Disney Branded Television announced plans for a live-action series of their own for Disney+. The series is to be co-produced by James Wan's Atomic Monster Productions and written by Stephany Folsom, and would be based on Cooper's original books and DeVito's new novelizations, focusing on a new Kong in modern times with characters exploring the origins and mysteries of his home island.

== Filmography ==
=== Films ===
Film	Release date	Director	Screenwriters	Producers	Distributors
Theatrical features
King Kong	March 2, 1933	Merian C. Cooper and Ernest B. Schoedsack	James Creelman and Ruth Rose	Merian C. Cooper and Ernest B. Schoedsack	RKO Pictures
Son of Kong	December 22, 1933	Ernest B. Schoedsack	Ruth Rose	Ernest B. Schoedsack	RKO Pictures
King Kong vs. Godzilla	August 11, 1962	Ishirō Honda (Japan); Thomas Montgomery (US)	Shinichi Sekizawa (Japan); Paul Mason and Bruce Howard (U.S.)	Tomoyuki Tanaka (Japan); John Beck (US)	Toho Co., Ltd. (Japan); Universal Pictures (US)
King Kong Escapes	July 22, 1967	Ishirō Honda	Takeshi Kimura	Tomoyuki Tanaka and Arthur Rankin Jr.	Toho Co., Ltd. (Japan); Universal Pictures (US)
King Kong	December 17, 1976	John Guillermin	Lorenzo Semple Jr.	Dino De Laurentiis	Paramount Pictures
King Kong Lives	December 19, 1986	John Guillermin	Ronald Shusett and Steven Pressfield	Martha Schumacher	De Laurentiis Entertainment Group
King Kong	December 14, 2005	Peter Jackson	Fran Walsh, Philippa Boyens and Peter Jackson	Jan Blenkin, Carolynne Cunningham, Fran Walsh and Peter Jackson	Universal Pictures
Kong: Skull Island	March 10, 2017	Jordan Vogt-Roberts	Dan Gilroy, Max Borenstein, and Derek Connolly	Thomas Tull, Jon Jashni, Alex Garcia and Mary Parent	Warner Bros.
Godzilla vs. Kong	March 31, 2021	Adam Wingard	Eric Pearson and Max Borenstein	Thomas Tull, Jon Jashni, Brian Rogers, Mary Parent, Alex Garcia, and Eric McLeod	Warner Bros.
Godzilla x Kong: The New Empire	March 29, 2024	Adam Wingard	Terry Rossio, Simon Barrett, and Jeremy Slater	Thomas Tull, Jon Jashni, Brian Rogers, Mary Parent, Alex Garcia, and Eric McLeod	Warner Bros.
Godzilla x Kong: Supernova	March 26, 2027	Grant Sputore	David Callaham	Thomas Tull, Jon Jashni, Brian Rogers, Mary Parent, Alex Garcia, and Eric McLeod	Warner Bros.
Direct-to-video animations
The Mighty Kong	June 16, 1998	Art Scott	William J. Keenan	Denis deVallance; Lyn Henderson	Warner Home Video
Kong: King of Atlantis	November 22, 2005	Patrick Archibald	Sean Catherine Derek	Allen Bohbot	BKN International
Kong: Return to the Jungle	November 14, 2006	Stuart Evans	Sean Catherine Derek; Rick Ungar	Allen Bohbot; Rick Ungar	BKN International

=== Television ===
Series	Seasons	Episodes	First released	Last released	Showrunner(s)	Network(s)
The King Kong Show	1	25	September 6, 1966	March 4, 1967	Arthur Rankin Jr. and Jules Bass	ABC (United States); NET (Japan)
Kong: The Animated Series	2	40	September 9, 2000	March 26, 2001	Sean Catherine Derek; Romain Van Leimt	M6
Kong: King of the Apes	2	23	April 15, 2016	May 4, 2018	Avi Arad and Allen Bohbot	Netflix
Skull Island	1	8	June 22, 2023		Brian Duffield and Jacob Robinson; Allen Bohbot	Netflix
Monarch: Legacy of Monsters	2	20	November 17, 2023	May 1, 2026	Chris Black	Apple TV

== Reception ==
=== Box office performance ===
Film	Year	Box office gross revenue (est.)				Ticket sales (est.)		Budget
Film	Year	United States and Canada	Other territories	Worldwide	Ref	United States and Canada	Japan	Budget
King Kong	1933	$10,000,000	$1,777,000	$11,777,000		7,800,000	—N/a	$672,000
Son of Kong	1933	$616,000	—N/a	$616,000		1,760,000	—N/a	$269,000
King Kong vs. Godzilla	1962	$2,700,000	$7,667,650	$10,367,650	(Note: See King Kong vs. Godzilla § Box office)	3,200,000	12,600,000	$620,000
King Kong Escapes	1967	$3,000,000	—N/a	$3,000,000	(Note: See King Kong Escapes § Box office)	2,300,000	—N/a	—N/a
King Kong	1976	$52,614,445	$38,000,000	$90,614,445		24,701,600	—N/a	$23,000,000 – 24,000,000
King Kong Lives	1986	$4,711,220	$44,200,000	$48,911,220	(Note: See King Kong Lives § Box office)	1,231,200	—N/a	$18,000,000
King Kong	2005	$218,080,025	$338,826,353	$556,906,378		33,885,140	1,900,000	$207,000,000
Kong: Skull Island	2017	$168,052,812	$400,600,000	$568,652,812		18,970,200	1,680,000	$185,000,000
Godzilla vs. Kong	2021	$100,916,094	$369,200,000	$470,116,094		—N/a	—N/a	$160,000,000
Godzilla x Kong: The New Empire	2024	$196,350,016	$373,577,619	$569,927,635		—N/a	—N/a	$150,000,000
Total		$752,329,392	$1,573,848,622	$2,330,889,234		93,848,140	16,180,000	$745,561,000

- N/A = no known data.

=== Critical and public response ===
Film	Rotten Tomatoes	Metacritic
King Kong (1933)	97% (58 reviews)	90% (12 reviews)
Son of Kong	42% (12 reviews)	50% (6 reviews)
King Kong vs. Godzilla	52% (21 reviews)	40% (4 reviews)
King Kong Escapes	—N/a	—N/a
King Kong (1976)	55% (51 reviews)	61% (11 reviews)
King Kong Lives	8% (10 reviews)	32% (9 reviews)
The Mighty Kong	—N/a	—N/a
King Kong (2005)	84% (262 reviews)	81% (39 reviews)
Kong: Skull Island	76% (389 reviews)	62% (49 reviews)
Godzilla vs. Kong	76% (378 reviews)	59% (57 reviews)
Godzilla x Kong: The New Empire	54% (229 reviews)	47% (51 reviews)

=== Academy Awards ===
Category		1977	2006	2018
Category		King Kong (1976)	King Kong (2005)	Kong: Skull Island
Best Cinematography		Nominated	—N/a	—N/a
Best Art Direction		—N/a	Nominated	—N/a
Best Sound (Note: Starting with the 49th Academy Awards (1977) and 90th Academy Awards (2018), the Best Sound Mixing and Best Sound Editing categories were consolidated into a single Best Sound category.)	Editing	Nominated	Won	—N/a
Best Sound	Mixing	Nominated	Won	—N/a
Best Visual Effects		Won	Won	Nominated

== Cultural impact ==
King Kong, as well as the series of films featuring him, have been featured many times in popular culture outside of the films themselves, in forms ranging from straight copies to parodies and joke references, and in media from comic books to video games. The Beatles' 1968 animated film Yellow Submarine includes a scene of the characters opening a door to reveal King Kong abducting a woman from her bed. The Simpsons episode "Treehouse of Horror III" features a segment called "King Homer" which parodies the plot of the original film, with Homer as Kong and Marge in the Ann Darrow role. It ends with King Homer marrying Marge and eating her father.

The British comedy TV series The Goodies made an episode called "Kitten Kong", in which a giant cat called Twinkle roams the streets of London, knocking over the British Telecom Tower. The controversial World War II Dutch resistance fighter Christiaan Lindemans — eventually arrested on suspicion of having betrayed secrets to the Nazis — was nicknamed "King Kong" due to his being exceptionally tall. Frank Zappa and The Mothers of Invention recorded an instrumental about "King Kong" in 1967 and featured it on the album Uncle Meat. Zappa went on to make many other versions of the song on albums such as Make a Jazz Noise Here, You Can't Do That on Stage Anymore, Vol. 3, Ahead of Their Time, and Beat the Boots.

The Kinks recorded a song called "King Kong" as the B-side to their 1969 "Plastic Man" single. In 1972, a 550 cm (18 ft) fiberglass statue of King Kong was erected in Birmingham, England. The second track of The Jimmy Castor Bunch album Supersound from 1975 is titled "King Kong". Filk Music artists Ookla the Mok's "Song of Kong", which explores the reasons why King Kong and Godzilla should not be roommates, appears on their 2001 album Smell No Evil. Daniel Johnston wrote and recorded a song called "King Kong" on his fifth self-released music cassette, Yip/Jump Music in 1983, rereleased on CD and double LP by Homestead Records in 1988. The song is an a cappella narrative of the original movie's story line. Tom Waits recorded a cover version of the song with various sound effects on the 2004 release, The Late Great Daniel Johnston: Discovered Covered. ABBA recorded "King Kong Song" for their 1974 album Waterloo and it was included as a B-side on the singles for "Honey, Honey" and "I've Been Waiting for You".

== Other media ==
=== Video games ===
#	Title	Year	Developer	Publisher	Platforms
1	King Kong	1982	Tigervision	Tigervision	Atari 2600
2	King Kong 2: Ikari no Megaton Punch	1986	Konami	Konami	Nintendo Family Computer
3	King Kong 2: Yomigaeru Densetsu	1986	Konami	Konami	MSX2
4	King Kong: The Eighth Wonder of the World	1990	Data East	Data East	Pinball
5	Kong: King of Atlantis	2005	Skyworks Interactive and Game Titan	Majesco	Game Boy Advance
6	Kong: The 8th Wonder of the World	2005	Ubisoft	Ubisoft	Game Boy Advance
7	Peter Jackson's King Kong	2005	Ubisoft Montpellier	Ubisoft	Game Boy Advance, GameCube, Microsoft Windows, PlayStation 2, Xbox, Nintendo DS, Xbox 360, PlayStation Portable
8	Godzilla Daikaiju Battle Royale	2012	AWM Studio Productions	AWM Studio Productions	Online
9	Colossal Kaiju Combat	2014 (delayed)	Sunstone Games	Sunstone Games, Sega (PS4), Nintendo (3DS and Switch)	Steam, PlayStation 4, Xbox One, Nintendo 3DS, Switch
10	KONG VR: Destination Skull Island	2017	Warner Bros. Pictures	Warner Bros. Pictures	Virtual reality
11	Call of Duty: Warzone	2022	Raven Software	Activision Publishing	Battle.net, PlayStation 4, Xbox One, PlayStation 5, Xbox Series X/S
12	Skull Island: Rise of Kong	2023	IguanaBee	GameMill Entertainment	PlayStation 5, PlayStation 4, Xbox Series X/S, Xbox One, Nintendo Switch, Steam

Various electronic games featuring King Kong have been released through the years by numerous companies. These range from handheld LCD games, to video games, to pinball machines.

Tiger Electronics released various King Kong games in the early 1980s, including a Tabletop LCD game in 1981, a video game for the Atari 2600 home video game system in 1982, a handheld game in 1982 in both a regular edition a large screen edition (the regular edition was later reissued by Tandy in 1984), an "Orlitronic" game (for the international markets) in 1983, and a color "Flip-Up" game in 1984. Epoch Co. released two LCD games in 1982. One was King Kong: New York, and the other was King Kong: Jungle

Konami released two games based on the film King Kong Lives in 1986. The first game was King Kong 2: Ikari no Megaton Punch for the Famicom, and the second was King Kong 2: Yomigaeru Densetsu, for the MSX computer. In 1988, Konami featured the character in the crossover game Konami Wai Wai World. All of these games were only released in Japan.

In 1990 Data East planned to release a pinball machine called King Kong: The Eighth Wonder of the World in 1990, but only 9 units were made. In 1992, Nintendo produced an educational game called Mario is Missing that features a treasure hunt level involving King Kong in New York City. The character is represented by images of his arm grabbing the Empire State Building in the NES version and a full body statue in the SNES version.

Bam! Entertainment released a Game Boy Advance game based on Kong: The Animated Series in 2002. MGA Entertainment released an electronic handheld King Kong game (packaged with a small figurine) in 2003. Majesco released a Game Boy Advance game based on the straight to video animated film Kong: King of Atlantis in 2005.

In 2005, Ubisoft released two video games based on the 2005 King Kong. Peter Jackson's King Kong: The Official Game of the Movie was released on all video game platforms, while Kong: The 8th Wonder of the World was released for the Game Boy Advance. Also to tie into the film, Gameloft released King Kong: The Official Mobile Game of the Movie for mobile phones, while Radio Shack released a miniature pinball game. Taiyo Elec Co released a King Kong Pachinko game in 2007.

King Kong appears in the Warner Bros. Interactive Entertainment game Lego Dimensions. He appears as a boss in The Lego Batman Movie pack.

In 2021, Raw Thrills released a cinematic virtual reality motion game called King Kong of Skull Island.

Also in 2021, King Kong became a playable character in the Toho mobile game Godzilla Battle Line as part of a crossover promotion with the film Godzilla vs. Kong.

In 2022, King Kong appears as a non-playable character alongside Godzilla in Call of Duty: Warzone. Once again as part of a crossover promotion with Godzilla vs. Kong, the update is titled Operation Monarch. A cosmetic outfit based on Kong is also released for both Warzone and Call of Duty: Vanguard. Also that year Kong appeared in the game World of Warships. In 2024, Kong was also featured in Call of Duty: Modern Warfare III and Call of Duty: Warzone 2.0 in an update called Godzilla x Kong: Battle for Hollow Earth to tie into the film Godzilla x Kong: The New Empire.

Also in 2022, King Kong appeared in the mobile game Kong Skull Island x Evony: The King's Return as a tie in to the film Kong Skull Island by Evony, LLC.

In 2023, Zen Studios released a three pack video game collection for Pinball FX called Godzilla vs. Kong: Pinball Pack which features three tables, Kong Pinball, Godzilla Pinball and Godzilla vs. Kong Pinball.

Also in 2023, GameMill Entertainment released Skull Island: Rise of Kong for all platforms.

In 2024 a trio of King Kong games were released. Hunted Cow Studios and Tilting Point released the mobile game Godzilla x Kong: Titan Chasers, 7Levels released Kong: Survivor Instinct for the PC and consoles, and Supersocial released Monsterverse Supersocial Roblox Experience for Roblox.

Also in 2024, a fully licensed electronic arcade whacking game machine called Godzilla vs. Kong Smasher was released by Unis Technology.

In January 2025, a purchasable outfit based on King Kong's appearance in the Monsterverse series was added to Fortnite Battle Royale.

In April 2025, Stern Pinball released a King Kong themed Pinball table called King Kong: Myth of Terror Island. The table comes in Pro, Premium, and Limited Editions.

In October 2025, IGG Inc. released a collaboration event with Godzilla x Kong: The New Empire and their RPG Doomsday: Last Survivors.

In April 2026, Call of Duty: Mobile featured an update for season four featuring a tie in with Godzilla x Kong: The New Empire. It allows the players to use either King Kong or Godzilla as an operator.

Besides starring in his own games, King Kong was the obvious influence behind other city-destroying gigantic apes, such as George from the Rampage series, Woo from King of the Monsters (who was modeled after the Toho version of the character), and Congar from War of the Monsters, as well as giant apes worshipped as deities, like Chaos and Blizzard from Primal Rage whose beast classification is listed as "Kong" on the toy packaging.

=== Literature and comics ===
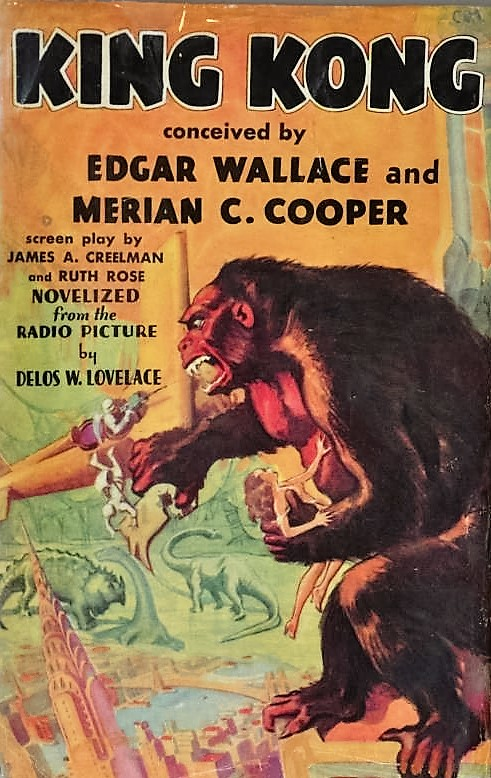
Cover of the 1932 novelization of King Kong written by Delos W. Lovelace. This novelization was released just over two months before the film premiered in New York City on March 2, 1933.

Over the decades, there have been numerous books, novels, and comic books based on King Kong by various publishers.

In December 1932, as the film King Kong was finishing production, Merian C. Cooper asked his friend Delos W. Lovelace to adapt the film's screenplay into a novelization. Published by Grosset & Dunlap, the book was released later that month on December 27, just over 2 months before the film premiered on March 2, 1933. This was a part of the film's advance marketing campaign. The novelization was credited as being based on the "Screenplay by James A. Creelman and Ruth Rose. Novelized from the Radio Picture". The byline written under the title was "Conceived by Edgar Wallace and Merian C. Cooper". However, despite the credit, Wallace had very little to do with the story or the character. In an interview, author-artist Joe DeVito explains:

From what I know, Edgar Wallace, a famous writer of the time, died very early in the process. Little if anything of his ever appeared in the final story, but his name was retained for its saleability ... King Kong was Cooper's creation, a fantasy manifestation of his real life adventures. As many have mentioned before, Cooper was Carl Denham. His actual exploits rival anything Indiana Jones ever did in the movies.

—

This conclusion about Wallace's contribution was verified in the book The Making of King Kong by Orville Goldner and George E. Turner (1975) where Wallace stated in his diary, "Merian Cooper called and we talked over the big animal play we are going to write, or rather I am writing and he is directing", and "An announcement has been made in the local press that I am doing a super horror story with Merian Cooper, but the truth is it is much more his story than mine...I shall get much more credit out of the picture than I deserve if it is a success, but I shall be blamed by the public if it is a failure which seems fair". Wallace died of pneumonia complicated by diabetes on February 10, 1932, and Cooper later had James Creelman and finally Ruth Rose finish the screenplay. Cooper would later state: "Actually, Edgar Wallace didn't write any of Kong, not one bloody word...I'd promised him credit and so I gave it to him".

Cooper issued a reprint of the novelization in 1965 that was published by Bantam Books. Some time later, the copyright expired and the publishing rights to the book fell into the public domain. Since then a myriad of publishers have reprinted the novelization numerous times. In 1983, Judith Conaway wrote a juvenile adaptation of the novelization called King Kong (Step Up Adventures) that featured illustrations by Mike Berenstain and was published by Random House books, while Anthony Browne wrote and illustrated another juvenile adaptation called Anthony Browne's King Kong in 1994. Credited as "From the Story Conceived by Edgar Wallace & Merian C. Cooper", the book was published by the Turner Publishing Company. It was re-released as a paperback in the U.K in 2005 by Picture Corgi. Blackstone Audio produced an audio recording of the book in 2005 narrated by Stefan Rudnicki, while StarWarp Concepts released an Ebook version complete with 6 new illustrations from pulp-comic artist Paul Tuma in 2017.

Outside of the novelization, the film was serialized in a pulp magazine. In 1933, Mystery magazine published a King Kong serial under the byline of Edgar Wallace, and written by Walter F. Ripperger. This serialization was published in two parts in the February and March issues of the magazine.

In the U.K, the film was serialized in two different pulps, both on October 28, 1933: in the juvenile Boys Magazine (Vol. 23, No. 608), where the serialization was uncredited, and in that month's issue of Cinema Weekly where it was credited to Edgar Wallace and written by Draycott Montagu Dell (1888–1940). This short story adaptation would later appear in the Peter Haining book called Movie Monsters in 1988, published by Severn House in the U.K. The novel was serialized in the London Daily Herald by H. Kingsley Long as well. The serialization was first published in April 1933 and ran 37 installments.

In 1973, Philip Jose Farmer wrote a short story sequel to the Lovelace novelization called After King Kong Fell that was published in OMEGA: a collection of original science fiction stories.

In 1977, a novelization of the 1976 remake of King Kong was published by Ace Books. This novelization was called The Dino De Laurentiis Production of King Kong and was simply the 1976 Lorenzo Semple Jr. script published in book form. The cover was done by Frank Frazetta.

To coincide with the 2005 remake of King Kong, various books were released to tie into the film. A novelization was written by Christopher Golden based on the screenplay by Fran Walsh, Philippa Boyens, and Peter Jackson. Matt Costello wrote an official prequel to the film called King Kong: The Island of the Skull. These books were published by Pocket Books. Various illustrated juvenile books were published, as well, by Harper Books: Kong's Kingdom was written by Julia Simon-Kerr; Meet Kong and Ann and Journey to Skull Island were written by Jennifer Franz; Escape from Skull Island and Kong: The Eighth Wonder of the World—Junior Novel were written by Laura J. Burns; The Search for Kong was written by Catherine Hapka; and finally, a Deluxe Sound Storybook of Kong: The Eighth Wonder of the World was written by Don Curry. Weta Workshop released a collection of concept art from the film entitled The World of Kong: A Natural History of Skull Island that was published by Pocket Books. The book was written and designed to resemble and read like an actual nature guide and historical record.

In 2005, Ibooks, Inc., published an unofficial book featuring King Kong called Kong Reborn, by Russell Blackford.

Starting in 1996, artist/writer Joe DeVito began working with the Merian C. Cooper estate to write and/or illustrate various books based on the King Kong character. The first of these was an origin story labeled as an authorized sequel/prequel to the 1932 novelization of King Kong called Kong: King of Skull Island. This illustrated hardcover novel was published in 2004 by DH Press and featured a story DeVito co-wrote with Brad Strickland and John Michlig. It also included an introduction by Ray Harryhausen. A large paperback edition was then released in 2005, with extra pages at the end of the book. A CD audiobook narrated by Joey D'Auria was released by RadioArchives as well, and an interactive two-part app was released in 2011 and 2013, respectively, by Copyright 1957 LLC. In 2005, DeVito and Strickland co-wrote another book together called Merian C. Cooper's King Kong for the Merian C. Cooper estate. This book was published by St. Martin's Press. It was a full rewrite of the original 1932 novelization, which updates the language and paleontology and adds five new chapters. Some additional elements and characters tie into Kong: King of Skull Island, enabling the two separate books to form a continuous storyline. In 2013, the first of two books featuring crossovers with pulp heroes was published. To coincide with the 80th anniversary of both King Kong and Doc Savage, Altus Press published Doc Savage: Skull Island in both softcover and hardcover editions. This officially sanctioned book was written by Will Murray and based on concepts by DeVito. In 2016, Altus Press published the other crossover book, this time featuring a meeting between King Kong and Tarzan. The novel, called King Kong vs. Tarzan, was once again written by Will Murray and featured artwork by DeVito. In 2017, a new book featuring another origin story, written and illustrated by DeVito, was released, called King Kong of Skull Island. Expanded versions of the book titled King Kong Skull Island: Exodus and King Kong Skull Island: The Wall were released by Markosia in 2020.

In March 2017, to coincide with the release of Kong: Skull Island, Titan Books released a novelization of the film written by Tim Lebbon and a hardcover book The Art and Making of Kong: Skull Island by Simon Ward.

In 2021, to coincide with the release of Godzilla vs. Kong, various tie-in books were released. On March 30, Legendary Comics released a graphic prequel novel called Kingdom Kong written by Marie Anello, as well as a children's picture book called Kong and Me written by Kiki Thorpe and illustrated by Nidhi Chanani. On April 6, Titan Books released Godzilla vs. Kong: The Official Movie Novelization written by Greg Keyes. Insight Editions released a children's board book called Godzilla vs. Kong: Sometimes Friends Fight (But They Always Make Up) written by Carol Herring, and on May 21, also released Godzilla vs. Kong: One Will Fall, The Art of the Ultimate Battle Royale written by Daniel Wallace.

In April 2024, to coincide with the release of Godzilla x Kong: The New Empire, Titan Books released a novelization of the film written by Greg Keyes.

=== Theme park rides ===
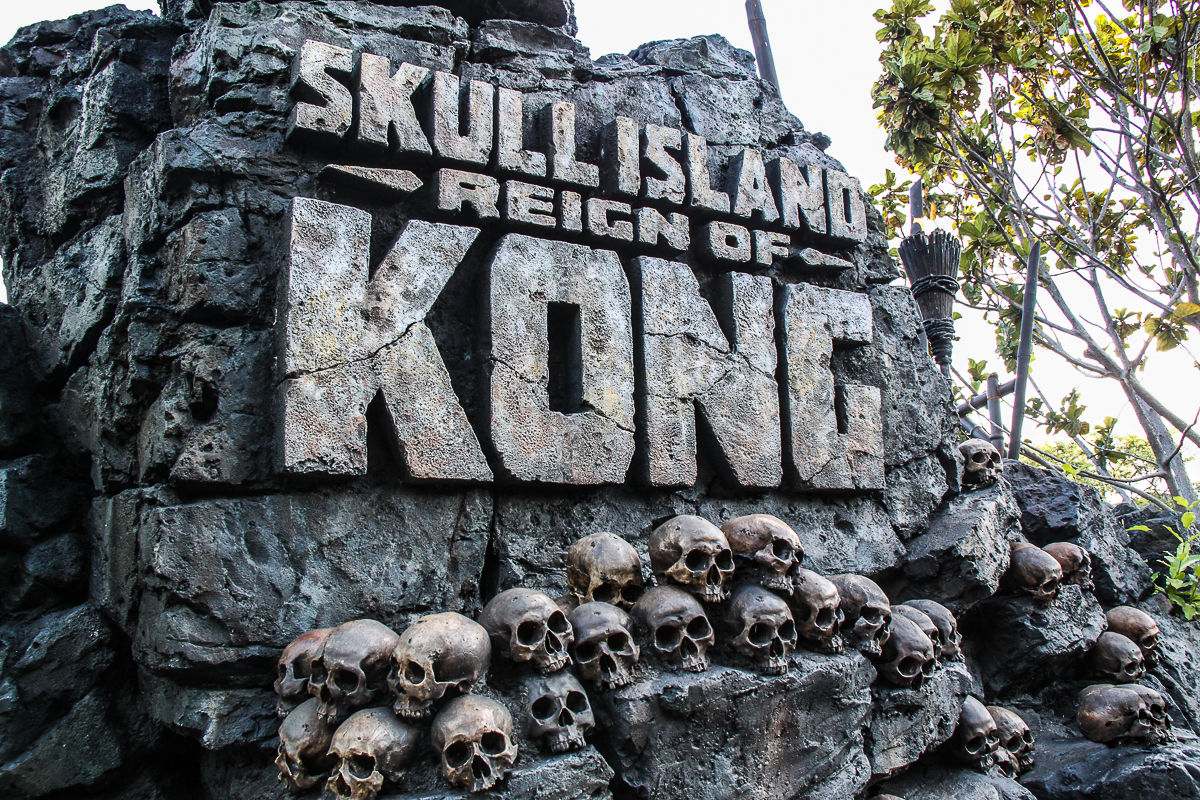
Skull Island: Reign of Kong at Universal's Islands of Adventure

Universal Studios has had popular King Kong attractions at Universal Studios Hollywood in Universal City, California and Universal Orlando Resort in Orlando, Florida.

The first King Kong attraction was called King Kong Encounter and was a part of the Studio Tour at Universal Studios Hollywood. Based upon the 1976 film King Kong, the tour took the guests in the world of 1976 New York City, where Kong was seen wreaking havoc on the city. It was opened on June 14, 1986, and was destroyed on June 1, 2008, in a major fire. Universal opened a replacement 3D King Kong ride called King Kong: 360 3-D that opened on July 1, 2010, based upon Peter Jackson's 2005 film King Kong.

A second more elaborate ride was constructed at Universal Studios Florida on June 7, 1990, called Kongfrontation. The ride featured a stand-alone extended version of King Kong Encounter and pinned guests escaping on the Roosevelt Island Tramway from Kong, who was rampaging across New York City. The ride was closed down on September 8, 2002, and was replaced with Revenge of the Mummy on May 21, 2004.

A new King Kong attraction titled Skull Island: Reign of Kong opened at Islands of Adventure on July 13, 2016, making it the first King Kong themed ride in Orlando since Kongfrontation closed down 14 years earlier at Universal Studios Florida.

A ride based on the Monsterverse titled Kong x Godzilla: The Ride opened at the Lotte World Adventure in Seoul, South Korea in December 2025.

=== Musical ===
A musical adaptation of the story (endorsed by Merian C. Cooper's estate) was staged in Melbourne at the Regent Theatre. The show premiered on June 15, 2013, as King Kong: The Eighth Wonder of The World, with music by Marius De Vries. The musical then premiered on Broadway on November 8, 2018, at the Broadway Theatre as King Kong: Alive on Broadway. The creative team included book writer Jack Thorne, director-choreographer Drew McOnie, and Australian songwriter Eddie Perfect, who replace the former creatives.

The huge King Kong puppet was created by Global Creature Technology. The puppet stands 20 feet tall and weighs 2,400 pounds. It is operated by a large rig with 10 onstage puppeteers, and features an array of microprocessors and tiny motors that power nuanced movements in the facial features. According to Sonny Tilders, who designed the Fiberglas and steel puppet for Global Creatures Company, "It's the most sophisticated marionette puppet ever made". Tilders also stated that Kong is built in layers, and is "quite similar to genuine anatomy". Over the steel skeleton, the body shell is a mixture of hard Fiberglas, enforced inflatables, high-pressure inflatables, and bags full of styrene beans that stretch and contort like muscles. Tilders said that they wanted to create the sense that Kong is a moving sculpture.

=== Other appearances ===
- The 1996 IMAX documentary Special Effects: Anything Can Happen featured a short remake of the original King Kong's ending set in Los Angeles. The remade scenes were the subject of its own documentary entitled Behind the Scenes with King Kong in Special Effects.

King Kong had three cameos in Warner Bros films:

- In the 2017 film The Lego Batman Movie, King Kong (voiced by Seth Green) appears as an inmate of the Phantom Zone. He is among the Phantom Zone inmates that the Joker releases in order to take over Gotham City. During the Joker's campaign, King Kong destroys one of the towers that Batman and the others hide in. With help from Robin, Batgirl, Alfred Pennyworth, and his enemies, Batman is able to defeat King Kong and send him and his fellow Phantom Zone inmates back to the Phantom Zone.
- In the 2018 film Ready Player One (based on the book of the same name), King Kong appears as one of the hazards of the OASIS racetrack.
- In the 2021 film Space Jam: A New Legacy, King Kong makes a cameo as one of the many spectators to a basketball game between the Tune Squad and the Goon Squad.

=== Other references ===
- King Kong, in name only, was referenced by Ian Malcolm as a sarcastic remark toward the gates of Jurassic Park in the titular 1993 film.
- A frame of King Kong in the 1933 film can be seen for a split second during the 2008 monster film Cloverfield.
- Both King Kong and Skull Island were referenced and made multiple appearances in the 2019 film Godzilla: King of the Monsters.

=== King Kong in the name ===
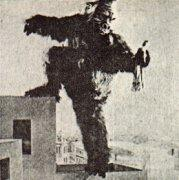
A publicity still of Isamu Yamaguchi playing King Kong on stage from Wasei Kingu Kongu

There were other unofficial movies to have borne the "King Kong" name:

- A lost silent Japanese short, Japanese King Kong (和製キングコング, Wasei Kingu Kongu), directed by Torajiro Saito, featuring an all-Japanese cast and produced by the Shochiku company, was released in 1933. The plot revolves around a down-on-his-luck man who plays the King Kong character in a vaudeville theater to earn money to woo a girl he likes. The film does not actually involve King Kong per se.
- The King Kong That Appeared in Edo (江戸に現れたキングコング, Edo ni Arawareta Kingu Kongu): a lost two-part silent Japanese period piece that was produced by a company called Zensho Kinema in 1938. The film revolves around kidnapping and revenge amongst the characters. The "King Kong" in this film is a trained ape (that looks more like a Yeti) who is used to kidnap one of the characters. Judging by the plot synopsis presented by periodicals at the time, the "King Kong" is regular-sized and is only depicted as gigantic on the advertisements for promotional purposes.
- The 1959 Hong Kong film King Kong's Adventures in the Heavenly Palace (猩猩王大鬧天宮), which features a normal-sized gorilla.
- The Hindi films King Kong (1962) and Tarzan and King Kong (1965), which feature the professional wrestler King Kong and have nothing to do with the famous movie monster, although the latter film features a normal-sized gorilla.
- The 1968 Italian film Kong Island (Eva, la Venere selvaggia, lit. 'Eve, the wild Venus'), which was advertised in the U.S. as King of Kong Island. Despite the American title, the film features normal-sized gorillas and takes place in Africa.
- The 1981 Mexican film Las Muñecas Del King Kong (The Dolls of King Kong), which features exotic jungle girls. The "King Kong" in the film is simply a giant ape statue on top of a building.

=== Related films ===
- The premise of a giant gorilla brought to the United States for entertainment purposes, and subsequently wreaking havoc, was recycled in Mighty Joe Young (1949), through the same studio and with much of the same principal talent as the 1933 original. It was remade in 1998.
- King Kong bears some similarities with an earlier effort by special effects head Willis H. O'Brien, The Lost World (1925), in which dinosaurs are found living on an isolated plateau. It was based on Sir Arthur Conan Doyle's novel of the same name.
- Banglar King Kong – an unofficial Bangladeshi musical based on the King Kong story and directed by Iftekar Jahan. The film uses large amounts of stock footage from the films King Kong and Mighty Joe Young, as well as National Geographic documentaries, and premiered in June 2010 in the Purnima Cinema Hall in Dhaka.
- Other similar giant ape films include:
  - The 1949 American comedy film Africa Screams, where a giant ape briefly appears.
  - The 1961 British film Konga, where a chimpanzee is enlarged after being fed a growth serum by a deranged scientist and attacks London.
  - The 1969 American film The Mighty Gorga, which features a circus owner's quest to capture a giant gorilla in an African jungle. Unlike King Kong, Gorga remains in Africa.
  - The 1976 Korean 3D film Ape, where a giant ape runs amok in Seoul, South Korea.
  - The 1976 British film Queen Kong, a film that parodies King Kong with a gender reversal between the giant ape and the object of the ape's affection.
  - The 1977 Hong Kong film The Mighty Peking Man, featuring a huge Bigfoot/ape-like creature that attacks Hong Kong after it was brought to Hong Kong from its territory somewhere in India near the Himalayas.
  - The 1977 Italian film Yeti: Giant of the 20th Century, featuring a giant abominable snowman running amok in Ontario after a millionaire industrialist thaws it out of a block of ice.
  - The 2005 The Asylum film King of the Lost World is a mockbuster of Jackson's King Kong, loosely based on the aforementioned The Lost World.
  - The 2018 American film Rampage, featuring a giant albino western lowland gorilla named George. The film is based on the 1986 arcade game Rampage, which itself is a video game parody of giant monster films.

== See also ==
- Kaiju
- Tokusatsu
- Godzilla
- Godzilla (franchise)
- Monsterverse
- Universal City Studios, Inc. v. Nintendo Co., Ltd.

== Bibliography ==
- Bahrenburg, Bruce (1976). The Creation of Dino De Laurentiis' King Kong. New York City: Pocket Books. ISBN 978-0671807962.
- Galbraith IV, Stuart (2008). The Toho Studios Story: A History and Complete Filmography. Scarecrow Press. ISBN 9781461673743.
- Morton, Ray (2005). King Kong: The History of a Movie Icon From Fay Wray to Peter Jackson. New York City: Applause Theatre & Cinema Books. ISBN 978-1557836694. OCLC 61261236.
- Nakamura, Tetsu; Shiraishi, Masahiko; Aita, Tetsuo; Tomoi, Taketo; Shimazaki, Jun; Maruyama, Takeshi; Shimizu, Toshifumi; Hayakawa, Masaru (November 29, 2014). Godzilla Toho Champion Festival Perfection (in Japanese). ASCII MEDIA WORKS. ISBN 978-4-04-866999-3.
- Pryor, Ian (2004). Peter Jackson: From Prince of Splatter to Lord of the Rings - An Unauthorized Biography. New York City: Thomas Dunne Books. ISBN 0-312-32294-1.
- Ryfle, Steve (1998). Japan's Favorite Mon-Star: The Unauthorized Biography of the Big G. ECW Press. ISBN 1550223488.
- Ryfle, Steve; Godziszewski, Ed (2017). Ishiro Honda: A Life in Film, from Godzilla to Kurosawa. Wesleyan University Press. ISBN 9780819570871.
- Sibley, Brian (2006). Peter Jackson: A Film-maker's Journey. London: HarperCollins. ISBN 0-00-717558-2.
- Woods, Paul A. (2005). "Kong Cometh!". Peter Jackson: From Gore to Mordor. London: Plexus Books. ISBN 0-85965-356-0.
- Gilberto Neri, Giant Gorilla Movies. A Critical History of Giant Apes, Gorilla Monsters, Ape-Men, and Television Creatures, 2026, pp. 267, ISBN 979-8198078628
- Id., It's Kong Craze! The Totally UNofficial 50th Anniversary Guide to Why the 1976 De Laurentiis Remake Changed the World, 2026, pp. 267, ISBN 979-8172356810
