= King Kong in popular culture =

Appearances of major cinema figure

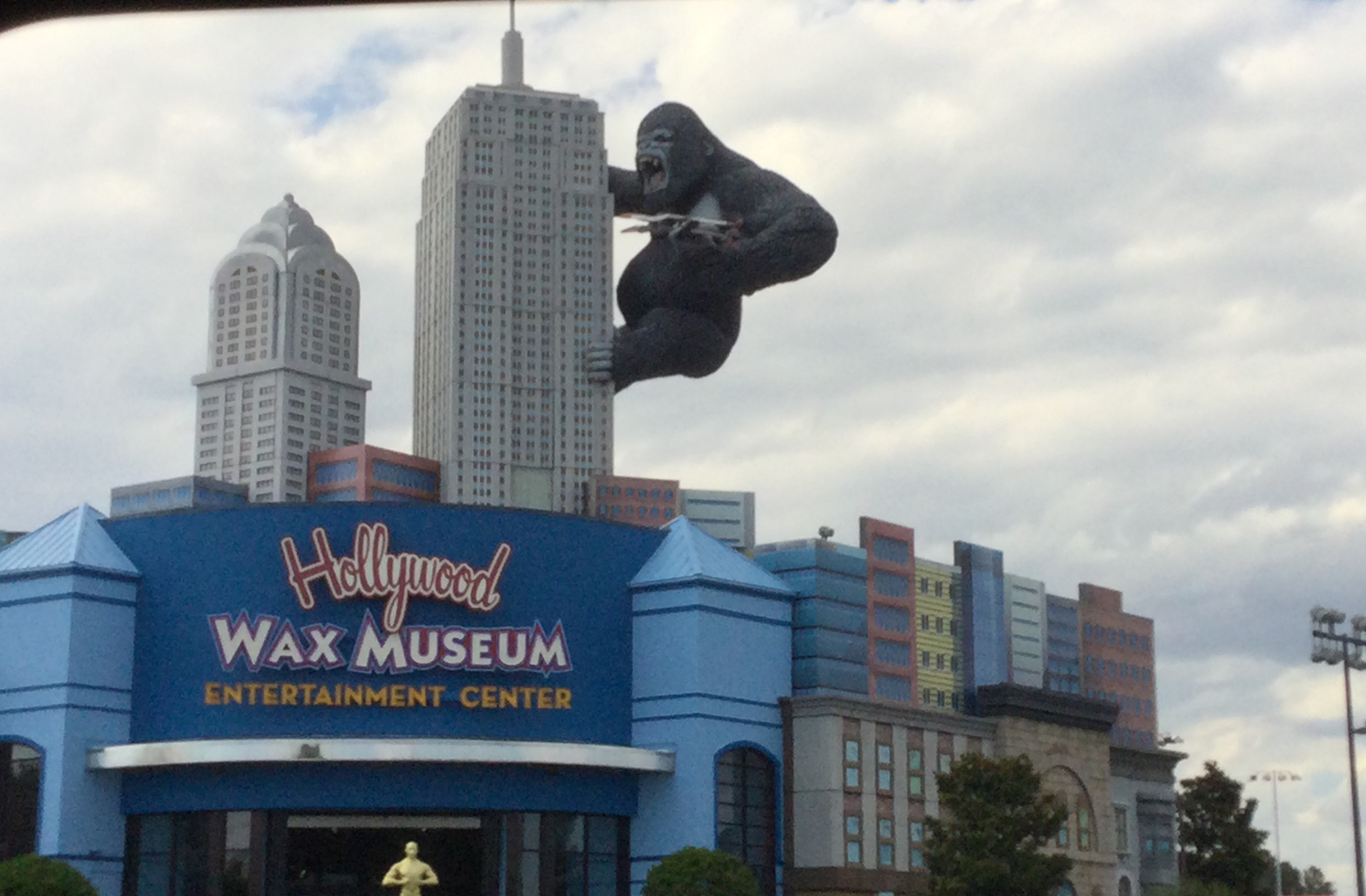
Statue of King Kong at the Hollywood Wax Museum in Myrtle Beach, South Carolina.

King Kong is one of the best-known figures in cinema history. He and the series of films featuring him are frequently referenced in popular culture around the world. King Kong has achieved the stature of a pop-culture icon and modern myth. King Kong has inspired advertisements, cartoons, comic books, films, magazine covers, plays, poetry, political cartoons, short stories, television programmes, and other media. The forms of references to King Kong range from straight copies to parodies and humorous references.

== 1930s and 1940s ==
The 1933 release of King Kong was an immediate hit at the box office, and had a huge impact on the popular culture of the 1930s. It was the first film to play in two of New York City's largest theatres at the same time, and the first in the 1930s trend for horror films. The combination of advanced special effects and primitivist content in the film made it popular among American and European intellectuals, especially the surrealists. Ray Bradbury remarked that when King Kong was released, "a mob of boys went quietly mad across the world, then fled into the light to become adventurers, explorers, zoo-keepers, filmmakers." There was a version of King Kong in the 1933 animated Mickey Mouse cartoon "The Pet Store" (also known as "Mickey and the Gorilla Tamer"). In the cartoon, the ape falls in love with Minnie Mouse and climbs to the top of a stack of boxes while holding her. Mickey and a group of birds, imitating the biplanes at the climax of King Kong, defeat the ape. In the 1933 animated Mickey Mouse short film, "Mickey's Mechanical Man", Mickey's invention, a robot, is engaged in a boxing match against an ape known as "The Kongo Killer".

The 1933 animated film King Klunk served as a parody of King Kong, being released six months after King Kong arrived in cinemas.

In 1938, King Kong received its first re-release, although some shots, such as King Kong removing parts of Ann Darrow's dress, and his chewing and stomping various extras, often in graphic close-up (via use of full-scale mechanical head and foot props), were removed because they were now considered unacceptable under the Production Code. King Kong was again re-released in 1942 and 1946. Despite its success, King Kong was not yet as important a part of popular culture as it would become in the future.

The controversial World War II Dutch resistance fighter Christiaan Lindemans – eventually arrested on suspicion of having betrayed secrets to the Nazis – was nicknamed "King Kong" due to his being exceptionally tall. Among the Dutch, the name "King Kong" is still more often associated with him rather than with the fictional ape.

== 1950s to the 1970s ==
The film was re-released in 1952, becoming one of the media events of that year. Time magazine named it "Movie of the Year". The film's studio RKO tried an experimental reissue of King Kong in the Midwest United States in 1952. In an unprecedented move they committed most of King Kong's promotional budget to television spots. The re-release was an enormous success, with the film attracting triple the usual business in its markets. This showed that television was a powerful tool for promotion. King Kong generated more box office receipts than the original 1933 release had. Theatre owners named it Picture of the Year. It was at this time that King Kong acquired its reputation as a popular culture phenomenon. In 1953, it became the first of more than 500 movies to be parodied by Mad. The sixth issue included a spoof by Harvey Kurtzman and Bill Elder titled "Ping Pong!"

The film became inspiration for other similar monster films like Mighty Joe Young (1949) and Godzilla (1954). Godzilla was inspired by King Kong's popularity in Japan and the film revived and reconfigured parts of the King Kong story more powerfully than any other film has. RKO theatrically re-released King Kong for the last time in 1956.

King Kong was sold to television after the conclusion of the 1956 release. One channel in New York showed the film seventeen times in a single week, with each showing topping the ratings. From then on, the film was a television mainstay that captured many new fans.

There is a reference to the real-world revival and massive success of King Kong in the 1950s in the 1959 film A Summer Place. In the film, two teenagers, Molly and Johnny, tell their parents that they are going to a classic movie showing of King Kong, when they are actually going to an abandoned lookout. Molly calls King Kong "one of those wonderful old horror numbers". Johnny frets that if he doesn't watch the movie, he might not be able to answer his parents' questions, but Molly tells him, "It's kind of sad dreams if anybody asks, just tell 'em about the end. That's the part everybody remembers". In 1974's Herbie Rides Again Alonzo Hawk has been having nightmares about Herbie. During his nightmare sequence there is a King Kong-themed dream. Alonzo dreams he's Kong with Herbie-like planes flying around him and squirting oil until he falls off the Empire State Building. In a Superman comic book story, an ape grew to giant size and gained kryptonite vision due to meteors of kryptonite and uranium, and was called Titano the Super-Ape. This ape had a liking to Lois Lane, and in one story climbed up the Daily Planet building.

King Kong reached the height of its public visibility in the twentieth century in the 1960s and 1970s, as part of a nostalgic trend to 1930s Hollywood. King Kong was becoming a cult film with nostalgia value. During this period the character and story of King Kong was most frequently used as a parody in popular culture. The frequency of its use as a parody at this time shows how significant it had become in popular culture. In the 1968 film Yellow Submarine, the characters look in a room where a monster ape smashes through a window to get at a screaming woman on a bed. "Do you think we're interrupting something?" George nonchalantly comments of it, to which John replies, "I think so".

In the mid-1960s RKO began to license a series of King Kong-related products in response to a heavy demand from the public. These products included comic books, games, models, and posters. In 1969 most of the censored shots were found. In 1971 a version of King Kong with these long-missing portions returned to their proper places was released to art houses.

References to King Kong in popular culture have been widespread since the 1960s. The references have different tones, with some being parodies while others are parodies or oppositional critiques. Some of these references are fleeting (for example, Frank Zappa named one of his more complex compositions with the Mothers of Invention after Kong), but nevertheless are evidence of King Kong's importance in popular culture. King Kong has been cited in films such as Morgan! (1966), The Rocky Horror Picture Show (1975), and Amazon Women on the Moon (1987). In The Rocky Horror Picture Show, the song "Science Fiction/Double Feature" pays homage to King Kong with the lyric: "Then something went wrong for Fay Wray and King Kong ... they got caught in a celluloid jam". At the end of the film, Rocky carries Dr. Frankenfurter on the RKO logo, replicating what King Kong carrying Fay Wray in the climax of King Kong.

In 1965 Monocle, a political satire magazine, cohosted a publisher's party at the Empire State Building with Bantam Books, who were reissuing Delos W. Lovelace's novelization of King Kong. A panel of Monocle satirists was due to give an ironic commentary on King Kong, followed by a screening of the film. One of the titles on the satirists' program was "King Kong to Viet Cong: Thirty Years of Gorilla Warfare". Andy Warhol, who was not on the guest list, used the occasion to generate publicity and create a performance by complaining to the press that King Kong should be screened with his own film Empire (1964). Warhol was permitted to show three minutes of Empire after King Kong. Empire was then criticized in the press for being too dull and being upstaged by King Kong.

In Mad Monster Party?, the giant gorilla "It" (with the vocal effects provided by Allen Swift) is a larger knock-off of King Kong and is most likely named "It" due to copyright reasons. Baron Boris von Frankenstein did not send an invite to "It", since "It" can be a bore and had crushed the Isle of Evil's wild boars the last time "It" was invited, as he explains to his assistant Francesca. Boris has his zombies patrol the island just in case "It" shows up uninvited. When "It" does show up, it goes on a rampage and snatches up the other monsters and Francesca (where "It" develops a crush on her) and climbs the Isle of Evil's tallest mountain. Boris convinces "It" to take him instead of Francesca, which "It" complies to. After Francesca is off the island with Boris' nephew Felix Flanken, Boris sacrifices his life where he drops the vial containing the secret of destruction which destroys himself, "It", the Isle of Evil, and everyone else that was on it at the time.

By the 1970s the character of King Kong was constantly referenced in cartoons and jokes. In a 1972 New Yorker cartoon, a man at a cocktail party atop the newly constructed World Trade Center comments that he is impressed that it was "finished so quickly and without incident", while King Kong climbs up the building below him. It was at this time that the film began to be studied by academics and film theoreticians, who found hidden subtexts and symbolic meanings in the film. However, Merian C. Cooper maintained that the film was nothing more than a simple adventure story.

Thomas Pynchon, in his post-modern 1973 novel, Gravity's Rainbow, treats the King Kong/Ann Darrow relationship as an obvious metaphor for Americans' historical racist paranoia of black men dating white women. He quotes the fictional film reviewer, Mitchel Prettyplace, from his "definitive 18-volume study of King Kong", which includes "even interviews with King Kong Kultists, who to be eligible for the group must have seen the movie at least 100 times and be prepared to pass an 8-hour entrance exam".

The character is mentioned in folk rock singer Jim Croce's 1973 song Bad, Bad Leroy Brown, where the eponymous Leroy Brown is described as being "badder than old King Kong" during the chorus.

King Kong influenced the 1974 Doctor Who story "Robot", where the Doctor and his friends in UNIT must stop Experimental Prototype Robot K-1 aiding the evil Scientific Reform Society in conquering the world. In homage to King Kong, K-1 falls for the Doctor's friend Sarah Jane Smith, and views her as the one human being it is willing to spare from destruction. When the Doctor is forced to destroy K-1 with a metal-eating virus, Sarah is visibly saddened.

In Mad Mad Mad Monsters (a "prequel of sorts" to Mad Monster Party?), there was a knock-off of King Kong called Modzoola.

After the highly promoted 1976 remake of King Kong, Elliot Stein wrote a nostalgic fan homage essay to King Kong called "My Life with Kong" in Rolling Stone magazine. Stein was one of the most famous of the "Kongophiles" along with Forrest J. Ackerman and Jean Boullet. In the essay Stein talks about the contexts in which he has seen King Kong during his life, including in the 1930s in New York picture palaces like Radio City Music Hall, and the RKO Roxy and in Paris with Jean Boullet in the 1950s. There was an art deco retrospective of King Kong at the Radio City Music Hall in the 1974 and a King Kong homage was staged for the Telluride Film Festival in the 1970s. King Kong was also mentioned by name by Kermit the Frog in lyrics from the song "I Hope that Something Better Comes Along" from The Muppet Movie: "She made a monkey out of old King Kong/I hope that something better comes along".

Additionally, King Kong is one of the epithets of Redd Foxx's character, Fred G. Sanford, from Sanford and Son when referring to his sister-in-law Esther.

The corpse of King Kong, said to be a leftover prop, appears in the 1978 film Bye Bye Monkey, where a small chimpanzee is found inside of it.

== 1980s to the present ==
King Kong was the first film to feature a giant monster running amok in civilization (the silent The Lost World was actually the first—although it featured a rampaging Brontosaurus rather than a non-science-based monster—but was rarely seen after its first release until the video and cable-TV booms of the 1980s); there are echoes of the original King Kong film in every giant-monster film that has been made since 1933. These include The Beast from 20,000 Fathoms (1953), Godzilla (1954) and Jurassic Park (1993). The dinosaur scenes from King Kong are referenced or mimicked in the three Jurassic Park films, especially the second film, The Lost World: Jurassic Park (1997). In the third act of the film, a creature (a Tyrannosaurus rex) is brought to civilization from a remote island where it runs amok in a city (the ship that transports the beast is even called The Venture, which is the name of the ship in King Kong). Kong is even mentioned directly in the first one: as the tour group approaches the massive Jurassic Park gate that is reminiscent of the gate in King Kong, Jeff Goldblum's character asks, "What have they got in there, King Kong?" In the third film in this series, a Spinosaurus vs. Tyrannosaurus rex fight is similar to the Kong–rex battle in the original and the second remake.

Homer Simpson as King Kong. From the "King Homer" segment of "Treehouse of Horror III". Courtesy of The Simpsons.

The 1988 film Scooby-Doo! and the Reluctant Werewolf features Genghis Kong (voiced by Jim Cummings), a giant Mongol ape who is a cross between King Kong and Genghis Khan.

One of the most frequently used images of King Kong in popular culture is the scene where King Kong and Ann Darrow are on top of the Empire State Building. This image has been copied or parodied in cartoons, comic books, horror films, and television commercials. A popular television spoof was the segment 'King Homer' from The Simpsons episode "Treehouse of Horror III", in which the King Kong story was retold featuring Simpsons characters, with Homer as Kong, Marge as Ann Darrow and Mr. Burns as Carl Denham. The spoof follows the plot of the 1933 film closely, but it ends with Marge marrying King Homer after he collapses in exhaustion, failing to climb beyond the second story of the Springfield State Building. King Kong's family, consisting of smaller apes, appear at the wedding, and Homer has a habit of eating people, such as Shirley Temple as well as Marge's father at the end. King Homer also has a cameo in the music video for "Deep, Deep Trouble" from The Simpsons Sing the Blues CD, and years later, makes another appearance in the opening couch gag of "Jazzy and the Pussycats". Homer grabs Marge from the couch and scales the Empire State Building, all while fending off 1930s-style airplanes. King Homer (or Homer Kong) would reappear battling Bridezilla (a Godzilla version of Marge Simpson) in the episode "Wedding for Disaster". The character also appeared in video games such as Bart's Nightmare and Treehouse of Horror as well as various merchandise such as toys and T-shirts. The original film was referenced again on The Simpsons in the episode "Monty Can't Buy Me Love", where Mr. Burns captures the Loch Ness Monster and brings him back to America to entertain an audience; however, instead of the Monster going berserk during its debut, Burns himself is startled by the flash photography and causes the carnage.

In the My Life as a Teenage Robot episode "Hostile Makeover", Jenny is turned into a Neanderthal and gorilla-like monster; when the cameras flashed their lights to take pictures of her, she roared.

In the second Futurama film The Beast with a Billion Backs, Richard Nixon's head remarks about an alien invasion that King Kong is "too old to save us this time". The camera then pans to an elderly King Kong holding Ann Darrow's skeletal remains.

King Kong is often used in commercial culture, for example in advertisements for Coca-Cola and Energizer Batteries. A New York insurance company used clips from the film to persuade people of the hazards of city life. A two-part Energizer Battery commercial had the 1933 Kong himself contracted by a rival battery corporation called SuperVolt to get rid of the Energizer Bunny for them. The commercials were done in black-and-white and used cleverly edited 1933 Kong sequences (possibly combined with new computer-generated Kong shots). The concluding second-part had Kong cornering the Bunny on the roof of a New York City building, complete with biplanes flying in the sky. His foot in an open window interrupts a couple that resemble Ann Darrow and Jack Driscoll having a romantic moment. The woman, extremely annoyed, slams the window on Kong's toes, making him lose his balance and grip, sending him falling. English author Graham Greene's last novel The Captain and the Enemy, published in 1988, contains a few allusions to King Kong and specifically, the theme of unrequited love of the monster for his captive, Ann; even other elements of the final scene of the film, such as military planes and Kong's eventual demise, are alluded to in the novel, which too ends with a death by an aeroplane crash. The main narrative of the novel, as written and recorded by one of the protagonists, is later discovered by a Panamanian military officer who continues to muse till the end of the novel on the meaning of the name "King Kong".

In 1990, Kongfrontation became one of the original rides at Universal Studios Florida.

The film character was the inspiration for the 1981 Nintendo video game Donkey Kong and subsequent spin-offs. In the game, the hero must rescue his girlfriend from the eponymous ape. The marauding ape climbs a huge structure after kidnapping the woman, as in the film. The game's creator Shigeru Miyamoto, intended the name "Donkey Kong" to mean "stubborn gorilla". MCA/Universal attempted to sue Nintendo for copyright infringement in Universal City Studios, Inc. v. Nintendo Co., Ltd., claiming that the game infringed its copyright for the film. However, they lost and had to pay Nintendo $1.8 million in damages when it was discovered that King Kong was in fact in the public domain at that time and that MCA/Universal knew this when they filed the lawsuit. They did not own the copyright to King Kong and had not trademarked the name "King Kong". They had even argued in the past that the name "King Kong" was in the public domain in Universal City Studios, Inc. v. RKO General, Inc.

The music video for Tom Petty & The Heartbreakers' "Runnin' Down a Dream" references the Empire State Building fight scene against the biplanes, where a giant Tom Petty swats at giant mosquitoes in the same manner as King Kong.

The music video to Cherrelle's 1984 single "I Didn't Mean to Turn You On" features the singer being pursued by a Kong-like gorilla who tracks her to her apartment.

In the film The Nutty Professor (1996), Sherman Klump has a nightmare where he is a giant, horrifically obese man. Reggie Warrington (a comedian from earlier in the film) exclaims, "Run for the hills, it's Fatzilla! Brother here looks like King Kong with titties!"

The film was featured in the 1999 film, The Cider House Rules, as the film that the orphans and the children of unwed mothers try to watch before the film cuts out on the projector.

In the video game Metal Gear Solid 2: Sons of Liberty, an argument over which building King Kong climbs in the climax blossoms into the beginning of the relationship between the main character Raiden and his girlfriend Rose.

King Kong was mentioned in the song of the same name by LA Symphony in 2002 on the album Baloney.

King Kong appears in the 2005 documentary T-Rex: A Dinosaur in Hollywood, where he was interviewed about his fight with the Tyrannosaurus rex in the original King Kong film from 1933. Throughout the documentary, King Kong was shown to live in a Beverly Hills mansion, with the narrator saying that he became a director of independent films after the release of the 1933 film.

The leader of the antagonistic Rabbids in the 2006 Nintendo Wii party game Rayman Raving Rabbids, Serguei, appears similar to King Kong: being a gorilla-like creature with a similar burly appearance. . King Kong appears in the Where My Dogs At? episode "Buddy and Woof Do the MTV Movie Awards". He appears on the stage background at the MTV Movie Awards hosted by Jimmy Fallon (who was the back-up host after Dave Chappelle slipped on a banana peel during his intro and had to be taken to the hospital). After Jimmy Fallon makes a comparison of King Kong and Jack Black after Jessica Simpson gave birth to Jack Black's child, King Kong ended up crushing Jimmy Fallon with his fists, much to everyone's delight. When the MTV Movie Awards are over, King Kong gets out of his shackles and heads home.

In the 2008 film Be Kind Rewind, Jerry (Jack Black) gets magnetized, thus erasing all the tapes in the titular video store where his friend Mike works. They alongside a local girl named Alma set out to remake the movies and one of them is the original King Kong film with Jerry wearing a makeshift King Kong outfit.

In The Mr. Men Show episode "Skyscrapers", he was seen carrying Little Miss Sunshine up a building.

In the Total Drama Action (2009–2010) episode "Celebrity Manhunt's Total Drama Action Reunion Special", the character Izzy plays a role as Ann Darrow and a monkey plays King Kong portraying a scene on the empire state building.

In the Family Guy episode "Hannah Banana", Miley Cyrus which turns out to be an android catch the Evil Monkey and I climbed it to the top of a building that resembles the Empire State. Peter Griffin and Glenn Quagmire in his plane they shoot her dead and rescue the Evil Monkey.

In the 25th Anniversary Super Sentai series Hyakujuu Sentai GaoRanger (2001), one of the living Power Animal mecha is a large green gorilla called Gao Gorilla, which stands over 100 ft. tall and is regularly seen in the series against the GaoRanger's enemy, the kaiju Orgu. The toy repaint of Gao Gorilla is featured prominently in the GaoRanger theatrical film in the same year "Hyakujuu Sentai GaoRanger- The Movie: Fire Mountain Howls" and is called Gao Kong. The primarily-red colored Gao Kong makes his debut from out of the crater of an erupting volcano and forms the torso & head of the Hyakujuu Gattai Gao Knight giant robot combination. Both Gao Kong and Gao Knight are only seen in the movie, but are not mentioned or seen in the TV series.

In Tensou Sentai Goseiger (2010), Kinggon of the Bigfoot, the military leader of the Yuumajuu, was named after King Kong.

In the anime-manga series Toriko, the protagonist is a gourmet hunter whose job is to travel around the world to hunt the most delicious animals and creatures. One of the first animals Toriko faces is a group of giant four-armed gorillas named Trollkongs that are led by an elder and even larger one named Silverblack Trollkong. The name of these creatures and the idea of a giant ape are based on King Kong's concept.

In the Script's song "Hall of Fame", it mentions King Kong.

In an episode of Pac-Man and the Ghostly Adventures titled "Jurassic Pac", it was shown in a parody where Pac-Man (in the style of King Kong) was seen carrying Cylindria up to a building (similar to the Empire State Building).

In The Fairly OddParents episode "The Good Old Days", King Kong was arrested by Carl Denham and others. In "The Big Bash", Timmy Turner and Remy Buxaplenty had to obtain a giant banana from King Kong as part of a scavenger hunt held by Cupid. Remy succeeds by bribing him with a starlet and escaping on a blimp. King Kong later joined the other characters from time in chasing after Cupid and then unleashed on Cosmo and Juandissimo by Wanda over a bet they had about winning her.

A special King Kong-themed wine was put out by Francis Ford Coppola's winery in 2016.

In the Cartoon Network show Codename: Kids Next Door episode "Operation: H.U.G.S", Numbuh 4 is captured by the giant Rainbow Monkey Kong (vocal effects provided by Frank Welker) on Rainbow Monkey Island in a role reversal. He gets rescued, but Rainbow Monkey Kong follows and is ultimately defeated when Numbuh 4 uses a giant wrestling robot to give it a goodbye hug.

The shows The Penguins of Madagascar, The High Fructose Adventures of Annoying Orange and We Bare Bears each have an episode spoofing Kong's ascent up the Empire State Building: in The Penguins of Madagascar, the episode "Otter gone Wild" portrays a feral Marlene carrying King Julien up the Cleopatra's Needle sculpture and the penguins (Skipper, Kowalski, Rico and Private) confront her in toy biplanes. In The Annoying Orange, the episode "King Coco" portrays Coconut swallowing a radioactive space rock which then mutates him into a King Kong-like monster. He then kidnaps Nerville and takes him up a skyscraper resembling the Empire State Building. Orange and the other food-characters also engage him in fighter biplanes until he pukes out the space rock. In We Bare Bears, the episode "Adopted" portrays a pet gorilla named Carl climbing up his owner's mansion with Panda as a hostage much like how Kong climbed the Empire State Building with Ann Darrow, and Grizz confronts him in a toy monoplane with a water gun. Carl also falls off the mansion, but unlike Kong, Carl survives.

In the 2017 film The Lego Batman Movie, King Kong (voiced by Seth Green) appears as an inmate of the Phantom Zone. He is among the Phantom Zone inmates that the Joker releases in order to take over Gotham City. During the Joker's campaign, Kong destroys one of the towers that Batman and the others hide in. With help from Robin, Batgirl, Alfred Pennyworth and his enemies, Batman is able to defeat Kong and send him and his fellow inmates back to the Phantom Zone.

In the 2018 film Ready Player One (based on the book of the same name), King Kong appears as one of the hazards of the OASIS racetrack alongside the Tyrannosaurus from the Jurassic Park franchise. In the film, he is placed at the end of the racetrack near the Empire State Building and is impossible for the racers to get by him. This prompts the protagonist Wade Watts/"Parzival" to search for a solution in James Halliday's life to a dialogue which urges him to go backwards traveling through the code of the game, in a tunnel which starts at the base of the Statue of Liberty and ends behind King Kong at Central Park where the finish line is.

King Kong appears in Space Jam: A New Legacy. He is among the characters in the Warner Bros. Serververse that watches the basketball game between the Tune Squad and the Goon Squad and is seen sitting near fellow spectator, The Iron Giant. When Al-G Rhythm becomes a member of the Goon Squad after Dom James defects to his enemies, he quotes "I am the game. King Kong ain't got nothing on me.", which Kong takes as an offense. Once the Tune Squad wins the game, Kong shares a fist bump with the Iron Giant.

King Kong appears in Call of Duty: Warzone as part of Operation Monarch. Operation Monarch ran from May 11, 2022 to May 25, 2022. Both Kong and Godzilla appear on the map as an environmental hazard for players to avoid.

On 23rd February 2024, the YouTube channel Epic Rap Battles of History made a rap battle featuring King Kong titled: Godzilla vs King Kong. This episode was made using CGI motion capture to represent both Godzilla and King Kong.

== See also ==
- King Kong – 2005 remake of the original film
- Peter Jackson's King Kong: The Official Game of the Movie
