= Skull Island: Rise of Kong =

2023 action-adventure video game developed by IguanaBee

- Developer: IguanaBee
- Publisher: GameMill Entertainment
- Director: Daniel Winkler
- Producers: Aaron Frenkel; Guillermo Gómez Zará; Tamara Wilder; Pamela Hauyon
- Programmer: Sebastian Beltran
- Composer: Ronny Antares
- Series: King Kong
- Engine: Unreal Engine 5
- Platforms: PlayStation 5; PlayStation 4; Xbox Series X/S; Xbox One; Nintendo Switch; Microsoft Windows
- Release: October 17, 2023
- Genre: Action-adventure

Skull Island: Rise of Kong is a 2023 action-adventure video game developed by IguanaBee and published by GameMill Entertainment. The game is based on the King Kong novels by DeVito Artworks.

The game was officially announced on July 20, 2023, after being leaked a day earlier. It was released on October 17 of the same year for PlayStation 5, PlayStation 4, Xbox Series X/S, Xbox One, Nintendo Switch, and PCs via Steam. The game received negative reviews from critics.

== Synopsis ==
Upon witnessing the death of his family by the Deathrunner Gaw, a young Kong raises himself to be much stronger and powerful enough to get revenge on the tyrannical menace. Years later, he reaches adulthood and traverse endlessly fighting the ferocious fauna until he searches for Gaw and would eventually become the king of Skull Island.

== Gameplay ==
Skull Island: Rise of Kong combines brawler combat with exploration gameplay, following Kong as he travels across the titular island after the death of his parents. Kong can perform a light attack, a heavy attack, or a targeted super-jump and can heal by collecting edible plants. Enemies include both the island's basic wildlife and several named bosses faced in dedicated arenas.

== Development ==
Joe DeVito, writer and illustrator of the novel Kong: King of Skull Island, was involved with the development of the game. He stated: "I could not be more excited to be working with GameMill Entertainment's talented team that will provide both King Kong fans and gamers the chance to experience King Kong's primordial world in a gamified way".

Following the poor reception of Skull Island: Rise of Kong, a report by The Verge revealed that GameMill gave IguanaBee one year to build the game from scratch, beginning in June 2022. Unnamed sources alleged that two to twenty developers were working on the game at any given time, and that the team were required to crunch in order to finish the project. The report also stated that GameMill gave IguanaBee very few details about the game, forcing the latter to improvise.

== Reception ==
This cutscene from Skull Island: Rise of Kong was poorly received by critics and went viral online.

Reception

Aggregate scores
Aggregator	Score
Metacritic	(PC) 23/100 (Note: Based on 5 reviews)
OpenCritic	10% (Note: Based on 10 reviews)

Review scores
Publication	Score
IGN	3/10
PC Gamer (US)	15%
GamingBolt	2/10

Skull Island: Rise of Kong received "generally unfavorable reviews" for the PC version, according to review aggregator website Metacritic. 10% of critics recommended the game, according to OpenCritic. Phil Hornshaw of IGN described the game as "ugly and full of bugs", stating that "at its core, it's just boring. It makes no meaningful attempts to do anything new or clever". Shunal Doke of GamingBolt said that "the game has terrible visuals, some downright horrendous gameplay, and level design that seems to be more keen on wasting your time rather than presenting you with any interesting challenges or rewards".

In one particular cutscene that was spread online via Twitter, King Kong has a flashback to his past while encountering an enemy, with a static image being presented on screen to represent the flashback before Kong attacks the enemy. Kong's animation was described by Zack Zwiezen of Kotaku as being equivalent to a "broken animatronic on some long-forgotten abandoned Disney ride".
