= King Kong 2: Yomigaeru Densetsu =

1986 video game

- Artwork by Noriyoshi Ohrai
- Developer(s): Konami
- Publisher(s): Konami
- Platform(s): MSX2
- Release: JP: December, 1986
- Genre(s): Role-playing video game
- Mode(s): Single-player

King Kong 2: Yomigaeru Densetsu (キングコング2 甦る伝説, Kingu Kongu Tsū: Yomigaeru Densetsu, lit. "King Kong 2: Revived Legend") is a 1986 MSX2 role-playing video game by Konami. It was released only in Japan and based on the movie of the same year, King Kong Lives (King Kong 2 being the film's title in Japan).

Similar to Konami's later Hi no Tori games, two separate games were developed together and released for the MSX and Famicom respectively. While the Famicom King Kong 2: Ikari no Megaton Punch has players playing as King Kong in a more action-oriented format similar to Nintendo's The Legend of Zelda, Yomigaeru Densetsu has players playing as Mitchell in a role-playing style.

== Development ==
The game was unofficially re-released in English by the South Korean company Zemina in 1987 as 킹콩II (King Kong II).

== Bibliography ==
- Kalata, Kurt (2017). Hardcore Gaming 101 Presents: Contra and Other Konami Classics. ISBN 978-1546928034.
