= King Kong Lives =

1986 American monster film directed by John Guillermin

- Theatrical release poster
- Directed by: John Guillermin
- Screenplay by: Ronald Shusett; Steven Pressfield
- Based on: Characters by: Merian C. Cooper; Edgar Wallace
- Produced by: Martha Schumacher
- Starring: Brian Kerwin; Linda Hamilton; John Ashton; Peter Michael Goetz
- Cinematography: Alec Mills
- Edited by: Malcolm Cooke
- Music by: John Scott
- Production company: De Laurentiis Entertainment Group
- Distributed by: De Laurentiis Entertainment Group
- Release date: December 19, 1986
- Running time: 105 minutes
- Country: United States
- Language: English
- Budget: $18 million
- Box office: $48.9 million (est.)

King Kong Lives (released as King Kong 2 in some countries) is a 1986 American monster adventure film directed by John Guillermin. Produced by the De Laurentiis Entertainment Group and featuring special effects by Carlo Rambaldi, the film stars Linda Hamilton and Brian Kerwin.

The film is a sequel to King Kong (1976) set ten years later. This was the final Kong film in which the title character was portrayed using suits and practical effects; further films would utilize computer animation. It is the sixth installment in the King Kong franchise.

== Plot ==
Ten years after he was shot down from the WTC (Note: As depicted in the 1976 self-titled film.) Kong is in a coma at the Atlantic Institute under the care of surgeon Doctor Amy Franklin. He requires a heart transplant with a computer-monitored artificial heart, but Kong has lost so much blood during his coma he needs a transfusion to permit him to survive the surgery. Dr. Franklin believes no species of ape or other animal has a blood type that matches Kong's.

Adventurer Hank "Mitch" Mitchell explores the jungles of Borneo, theorizing that Kong's home island was once part of the same land mass. Mitch encounters a giant female ape of Kong's species, whom native hunters subdue with sumpit darts. Mitch offers to send the ape, whom he dubs "Lady Kong", to the institute so her blood can be used for Kong's operation. Over Franklin's objections and apprehension about the risks the institute accepts the offer and the operation is carried out. Kong's blood transfusion and the heart transplant are a narrow success. Kong revives and senses Lady Kong's presence. The institute attempts to remove Lady Kong, causing her to panic. Kong breaks free from his containment and rescues Lady Kong from hers. The two apes escape into the wilderness together.

A military force led by Lieutenant Colonel Archie Nevitt proceeds into the jungle to recapture the apes. Franklin and Mitchell team up to save the apes from the aggressive military forces. Kong and Lady Kong bond and become mates. Nevitt's forces find the apes, and launch an attack. Lady Kong is captured while Kong falls into a ravine and is presumed dead.

Months later, Lady Kong is still in Nevitt's custody. Mitchell attempts to buy land in Borneo for a reserve. Franklin, permitted to observe her, suspects Lady Kong may sense a still alive Kong. Franklin's peers dismiss the idea, until Kong reappears, wandering through an inhabited neighborhood. Nevitt's forces and local hunters set out to hunt Kong down. Nevitt disregarding orders to capture Kong alive.

Franklin and Mitchell find Kong trapped and tormented by a group of hunters. Franklin realizes Kong's artificial heart is failing, and when Kong breaks loose, inadvertently destroying the computer that controls his heart, he's left with little time to live. Franklin and Mitchell follow Kong into Nevitt's compound to help free Lady Kong, and discover she is pregnant with Kong's offspring.

The apes escape to a farmhouse where Lady Kong goes into labor. Nevitt's forces attack Kong, who, despite being grievously wounded, drives off the military and kills Nevitt. As Franklin and Mitchell watch, Lady Kong successfully gives birth to a male ape. Kong touches his son before dying from his wounds.

Lady Kong and her son are brought back to the reserve in Borneo to live out their days in peace.

== Cast ==
- Brian Kerwin as Hank Mitchell
- Linda Hamilton as Dr. Amy Franklin
- Peter Elliott as King Kong
- John Ashton as Lt. Col. Archie Nevitt
- George Yiasoumi as Lady Kong
- Benjamin Kechley as Baby Kong
- Frank Maraden as Dr Benson Hughes
- Peter Michael Goetz as Dr. Andrew Ingersoll
- Jimmie Ray Weeks as Major Peete
- Jimmy Wiggins as Boyfriend
- Mary Swafford as Girlfriend
- Michael Forest as Vance
- Leon Rippy as Will
- Mike Starr as Cell Guard
- Herschel Sparber as Jay
- Wallace Merck as Chigger
- Dean Whitworth as Scruffy
- Jonathan Canfield as Jump Ranger #1
- Jack Wheeler (twin) as Officer #1
- Joe Wheeler (twin) as Officer #2
- David Hartzell as Sergeant #1
- Patrick Webb as Infantryman
- Greg Hendrixson as Jump Ranger #2
- Jim Grimshaw as Sergeant
- Robin Cahall as Mazlansky
- Matt Totty as Sgt. Tucker
- Rod Davis as TV Reporter

== Production ==
Dino De Laurentiis had been interested in making a sequel to King Kong since he made the remake. In 1977, he said there would "definitely" be a sequel. "Steve McQueen made a picture in which he died at the end, but they made another picture with Steve McQueen. Many stars die at the end of a picture and then go on to the next picture. Kong is a star. We are going to have a new story, a new Kong."

The progress of a sequel was complicated by the fact the 1976 film was considered a financial disappointment and there were ongoing legal uncertainties over who owned the rights to King Kong. A number of scripts had been written. "They had King Kong in Russia and King Kong in outer space", said writer Steve Pressfield. "Really, this is not an exaggeration. They even had one with little kids leading him around, saying things like 'Careful, Kong, don't step on that car.' It really was an embarrassment."

Pressfield and Ron Schusett pitched the idea that Kong has been on a giant respirator for years, and he was brought back to life with an artificial heart. According to Pressfield, "Dino loved the whole idea of the artificial heart and said, 'That's brilliant. I've been wondering for five years how to bring him back to life in a way that people would accept.' Sure, it's campy, but It's outrageous enough that it really works." John Guillermin had been hoping to direct a version of Tai-Pan with Sean Connery but when that project was unable to be financed, he moved on to King Kong Lives. The writers met with Guillermin and together devised the story about Kong getting an infusion from a female ape. "When we came up with the idea, Dino was very skeptical and didn't want to do it", said Pressfield. "It's hard enough to accept that there's a King Kong but since he has been around for 50 years he has become a pop cult hero. No one is going to believe a female ape.' I said, 'Dino, he had to have a mother,' And he said, 'By God, you're right, I never thought of that. There can be a female,' and we went with it."

The film was announced in October 1985. It was part of a slate of films from De Laurentiis in association with Embassy that also included Blue Velvet. Pressfield said "The whole thing is a love story with the two apes, but there's also a lot of action and an uplifting ending, although there are some elements of tragedy, as there were in the original. We even give a nod to women's lib with Lady Kong falling for the male scientist. Of course, this is before she meets the King." Guillermin said later that making a sequel to King Kong was a bad idea. "Dino was striking out on all sorts of things at the time. It's really too bad [that he suffered a run of flops]. He was involved with some interesting projects."

Brian Kerwin said, "I knew that my name would be up there as the lead, but there was never any question that the star of the movie was the ape. Also, the 1976 movie had such low prestige and Jessica Lange was ridiculed, but then so was Christopher Reeve for Superman, and look at the subsequent success of those two. So, I don't worry about it. We tried to have fun when we were making the movie, without poking fun at it. It's an adult fairy tale and it has humor. If people think it's a silly piece of fluff and we're all jerks, then that's the way it goes. I hope it doesn't happen." The film's leading star Linda Hamilton said, "I'm happy that I don't have to get picked up by the monkey and become the object of his desire. I save Kong. And it's nice to play someone who is not hysterical and dramatic and intense all the time."

Filming started in April 1986 in Tennessee. "The movie is about Kong, about special effects, about jeeps being blown up," says John Ashton. Charles McCracken is listed as a director in some circles, which suggests that he did uncredited work as director.

== Release ==
=== Home media ===
King Kong Lives was released on VHS and LaserDisc in 1987 by Lorimar Home Video, on DVD in 2004 by 20th Century Fox, and on Blu-ray in 2023 by Umbrella Entertainment.

== Reception ==
=== Box office ===
Despite its marketing campaign, King Kong Lives was a box office flop in the United States and Canada, grossing $4,711,220 during its theatrical run.

According to one account, "Besides the fact that audiences have noses for a stinker, King Kong Lives lacked an effective advertising campaign that sold its premise (Kong finds a mate), and the movie was sold as if it was just another B-movie retread. Which it was, but on an A budget."

Overseas, the film was a success in the Soviet Union, where it sold 53.6 million tickets in 1988, becoming the top-grossing foreign film of the year and one of the top 15 highest-grossing foreign films of all time. At an average 1980s Soviet ticket price of 50 kopecks, the film's ticket sales are equivalent to an estimated gross revenue of approximately 26.8 million Rbls ($44.2 million).

The film sold a total of 54,831,200 tickets worldwide, including 1,231,200 tickets in North America. The film grossed an estimated total revenue of approximately $48,911,220 worldwide.

The financial failure of the movie (while it earned 3.7x its budget, it ultimately lost money due to its marketing costs) - along with movies such as Tai-Pan - led to the bankruptcy of De Laurentiis' company.

=== Critical response ===
King Kong Lives was panned by critics. Rotten Tomatoes reports an 8% approval rating based on 13 reviews, with an average rating of 2.6/10. On Metacritic, the film has a weighted average score of 32 out of 100 based on 9 critic reviews, indicating "generally unfavorable" reviews. Audiences polled by CinemaScore gave the film an average grade of "D+" on an A+ to F scale.

Roger Ebert gave the film only one out of four stars and stated, "The problem with everyone in King Kong Lives is that they're in a boring movie, and they know they're in a boring movie, and they just can't stir themselves to make an effort." DEG sent a notice to Ebert and Gene Siskel notifying the two critics that they were allowed to show snippets of the film on TV in their native Chicago, but were forbidden to show the same snippets on their nationally broadcast series At the Movies unless they promised to give positive reviews, which the pair refused to agree to. Siskel remarked, "Obviously, they were scared [...] If you don't believe me or Roger, believe the film company, that, think about it, couldn't find a single scene that it wanted you to see." In fact, Ebert playfully noted that the children in the audience were so bored with the film, they found playing with one of the auditorium's doors a more diverting activity.

Patrick Goldstein of the Los Angeles Times opined that "this sequel, directed by John Guillermin (who was also at the helm of the 1976 version) is in good hands as long as Kong is on screen. (Designer Carlo Rambaldi has done a masterful job of sculpting his mighty ape's features, giving him heft, surprising agility and, perhaps to age him a bit, a receding hairline.) But the film makers haven't been able to improve on the original story. It's still Kong vs. Civilization, with a lot of high-firepower action and wackily implausible plot twists thrown in to keep the Big Guy busy." Rambaldi's work was also lauded by Janet Maslin of The New York Times, but she nonetheless remarked that "King Kong Lives, which was directed by John Guillerman, has a dull cast and a plot that's even duller." Staff members of Variety remarked that "in portraying an Indiana Jones-type figure, [Brian] Kerwin strains for plausibility and [the] film swiftly begins to lose some early credibility."

The film was nominated for a Golden Raspberry Award for Worst Visual Effects at the 7th Golden Raspberry Awards. Actor Peter Goetz received a residual check of three cents from the film and decided to frame it as a tribute, never cashing it.

The film is listed in Golden Raspberry Award founder John Wilson's book The Official Razzie Movie Guide as one of The 100 Most Enjoyably Bad Movies Ever Made.

FilmInk called the movie "awful. There's no sense of adventure or danger: the bulk of the film takes place in the USA, and the rampage of Kong is played for laughs (being whacked on the head by a golf ball, etc). The leads, Linda Hamilton and Brian Kerwin, could have been cut out of the film entirely. Who wants to see a King Kong movie where the apes are in love with each other and not a human?"

== Other media ==
=== Video games ===
Two official video games based on the film were developed and released only in Japan by Konami. They were titled King Kong 2: Ikari no Megaton Punch for the Famicom, and King Kong 2: Yomigaeru Densetsu for the MSX. The Famicom game totally discarded the human aspect of the story and players played as King Kong who has to travel around the globe fighting giant robots and certain military forces in order to save Lady Kong. The game was designed as an action-adventure game with some science fiction concepts. The MSX version, on the other hand, plays from the perspective of Hank Mitchell. This version is a role-playing game.

== Notes ==
- Murray, Will (December 1986). ""King Kong Lives!" Is It Monkey Sequel Monkey Do?". Starlog. pp. 53–55, 64.
