= King Kong 2: Ikari no Megaton Punch =

1986 video game

- Box art by Noriyoshi Ohrai
- Developer(s): Konami
- Publisher(s): Konami
- Composer(s): Shinya Sakamoto; Satoe Terashima; Kinuyo Yamashita; Kiyohiro Sada
- Platform(s): Family Computer
- Release: JP: December 18, 1986
- Genre(s): Action-adventure
- Mode(s): Single-player

King Kong 2: Ikari no Megaton Punch (キングコング2 怒りのメガトンパンチ, Kingu Kongu Tsū: Ikari no Megaton Panchi; lit. "King Kong 2: The Furious Megaton Punch") is a 1986 Family Computer action adventure game by Konami. It was released only in Japan and based on the film of the same year, King Kong Lives (King Kong 2 being the film's title in Japan).

== Plot ==
After being shot down from the World Trade Center, Kong is kept alive in a coma for about ten years. When another Kong-sized female gorilla is found, a blood transfusion is arranged from the female and an artificial heart is installed inside Kong. With a functioning heart, Kong escapes from the facility and seeks to procreate with the female Kong still held in captivity.

== Gameplay ==
The player assumes the role of King Kong, who is in search of his female ape companion, Lady Kong, who is in captivity. The player must travel through nine different maze-like worlds consisting of military facilities, mountain ranges, jungles, cities and underground locations. The entire game takes place at an overhead view. He must destroy enemies and landscapes by punching, stomping, and throwing giant rocks as projectiles. Some of these enemies include robots, blob creatures, and even large animals. By destroying the landscape in all of these worlds, various hidden items and doorways can be uncovered in the process.

Power-ups can increase Kong's maximum life (hit points) as well as the maximum amount of rocks he can hold. There are also power-ups which will make his rock projectile more powerful, increase his speed, and even make him temporarily invincible. Doorways, hidden all over each world, will either transport Kong to another location within the world or to another world completely. These doorways, which on some occasions do not need to be uncovered, are the only means to reaching different worlds in the game. Other doorways contain rooms with hidden power-ups or a world's boss.

The player must find and defeat each of the bosses in the game's first eight worlds to which they will yield a key. When all eight keys are collected, the player can enter a large door in world 9, which holds the game's final boss and rescue Kong's love.

The player is given three lives to complete the game, with a sparing amount of opportunities to gain extra lives and no continues. Once the player memorizes where power-ups, doors and boss locations are sited, the game is made considerably shorter to complete.

== Release and reception ==
Reception

Review score
Publication	Score
Famitsu	6/10, 8/10, 8/10, 7/10

Horrorandsons.com stated that King Kong Lives: Ikari no Megaton Punch is in line with many video games based on films, offering a cohesive but generally underwhelming gaming experience.

== Bibliography ==
- Kalata, Kurt (2017). Hardcore Gaming 101 Presents: Contra and Other Konami Classics. ISBN 978-1546928034.
