= King Kong vs. Tarzan =

2016 novel by Will Murray

- Cover of first edition
- Author: Will Murray
- Cover artist: Joe DeVito
- Language: English
- Series: The Wild Adventures of King Kong; The Wild Adventures of Tarzan
- Genre: Adventure novel
- Publisher: Altus Press
- Publication date: 2016
- Publication place: United States
- Media type: Print (paperback)
- Pages: 465
- ISBN: 978-1-61827-281-2

King Kong vs. Tarzan is a 2016 novel by Will Murray, featuring the characters created by Edgar Rice Burroughs in a crossover with the characters created by Merian C. Cooper for the novelization of King Kong. It is authorized by Burroughs' estate.

== Plot ==
After capturing King Kong on Skull Island, Carl Denham ferries him across the Indian Ocean, planning to eventually take him to New York City. Trouble befalls the tramp steamer Wanderer, and she is forced to make landfall in Africa, home of Tarzan, whom Denham had met once some years before. Kong escapes and roams the jungles, unintentionally causing havoc amongst its population as he slaughters numerous African wildlife and desecrates the elephant graveyard. Hearing reports of a giant gorilla on the loose, Tarzan investigates. A climactic showdown in a thunderstorm is joined between the Lord of the Jungle atop a herd of elephants and the King of Skull island, with Carl Denham trying to recapture Kong and scheming to do the same thing to Tarzan.
