= MonsterBag =

2015 video game

- Developer(s): IguanaBee
- Publisher(s): Sony Computer Entertainment
- Director(s): Cristian González
- Designer(s): Cristian González; Glenn Lazo
- Programmer(s): Daniel Winkler
- Artist(s): Cristian González; David Rioseco; Glenn Lazo; Moisés Aguilera
- Writer(s): David Rioseco
- Composer(s): Ronny Antares
- Platform(s): PlayStation Vita
- Release: NA: 7 April 2015; PAL: 8 April 2015
- Genre(s): Puzzle, stealth
- Mode(s): Single-player

MonsterBag is a 2015 stealth video game developed by Chilean company IguanaBee and published by Sony Computer Entertainment for the PlayStation Vita.

== Gameplay ==
The story centers around V, a little monster who doubles as a bag. It wants to be with its friend, Nia. Unfortunately, they live in a world afraid of monsters, so V must catch up to Nia without being seen by any humans.

Each level in the game requires V to solve a puzzle while avoiding detection by the humans. MonsterBag, despite its seemingly cute and well animated visuals, pivots toward graphic violence and black comedy whenever possible.

== History ==
According to Daniel Winkler, production on the title was challenging, as their status as a Chilean company and its small sizes made it difficult to acquire sufficient resources until Sony acquired the title's rights and assisted in development.

== Reception ==
Steven Hansen of Destructoid praised the game for its well-designed gameplay and charming slapstick humor, but felt that later chapters, with their more serious tone and complex gameplay contrasts unfavorably with the game's design.
