= Walter Melon =

Walter Melon may refer to:

- The English-language version of the cartoon character Achille Talon
  - Walter Melon (TV series), the English-language TV series based on the character
- The main villain from Aqua Teen Hunger Force Colon Movie Film for Theaters
