= King Kong (2005 video game) =

2005 action-adventure game by Ubisoft

- North American PC cover art
- Developers: Ubisoft Montpellier (Note: Ported to Windows by Ubisoft Bucharest and to PSP by Phoenix Studio.); Ubisoft Casablanca (DS); Ubisoft Montreal (GBA); Gameloft (mobile)
- Publisher: Ubisoft
- Director: Michel Ancel
- Producers: Peter Jackson; Xavier Poix
- Designers: Michel Ancel; Sébastien Morin
- Programmer: Christophe Beaudet
- Artist: Florent Sacré
- Writers: Jacques Exertier; Philippa Boyens
- Composer: Chance Thomas
- Engine: Jade
- Platforms: Mobile phone; GameCube; PlayStation 2; Windows; Xbox; Xbox 360; Game Boy Advance; Nintendo DS; PlayStation Portable
- Release: 17 November 2005: Mobile; NA: 14 November 2005 GameCube, Windows, PlayStation 2 & Xbox; PAL: 17 November 2005; NA: 22 November 2005 Xbox 360; NA: 22 November 2005; EU: 2 December 2005; AU: 23 March 2006 Game Boy Advance, Nintendo DS; NA: 22 November 2005; EU: 9 December 2005; AU: 15 December 2005 PlayStation Portable; EU: 16 December 2005; NA: 20 December 2005; AU: 20 December 2005
- Genres: First-person shooter, action-adventure
- Modes: Single-player, multiplayer (PSP version only)

Peter Jackson's King Kong: The Official Game of the Movie (also known as Peter Jackson's King Kong, or simply King Kong) is a 2005 action-adventure video game developed by Ubisoft Montpellier and published by Ubisoft, based on the 2005 film King Kong. It was created in collaboration between the film's director Peter Jackson and the game's director Michel Ancel. The film's cast members reprise their roles. The game follows New York scriptwriter Jack Driscoll through Skull Island, as he attempts to save love interest Ann Darrow who has been sacrificed by the island's natives to the giant gorilla Kong.

The game allows players to play as both Jack Driscoll and King Kong. Players use firearms and spears as Jack; and punch, grab and use objects/corpses as Kong, to defend against and fight creatures on Skull Island. The King Kong segments are played from a third-person perspective, while the Jack levels are played from a first-person perspective. The game de-emphasizes the role of a heads-up display (HUD), with the developers explaining that this conceivably would help players to get further immersed into the game (although the HUD can be turned on in the settings).

It was released in November 2005 for Microsoft Windows, GameCube, PlayStation 2, Xbox, and the Nintendo DS, as well as the Xbox 360 as a launch title. Versions for mobile phones were released by Gameloft on 14 November 2005, a few days before the home console releases. A version for Game Boy Advance titled Kong: The 8th Wonder of the World was released simultaneously. A PlayStation Portable version was released in December 2005. Upon release, the console and PC versions received positive reviews, with critics praising the game's cinematic quality, environments, and ability to play as both Jack and Kong. The DS and PSP versions were received more critically. Retrospectively, King Kong has been praised as one of the best film tie-in games and is considered by some to be ahead of its time.

== Gameplay ==
In the game, the player assumes the roles of both New York scriptwriter Jack Driscoll and the giant gorilla King Kong as they struggle to survive the threats of Skull Island in 1933.

Human levels are controlled from a first-person perspective. The game de-emphasizes the role of a HUD: it lacks a life bar, aiming reticle, and ammunition readout (the ammo readout and aiming reticle can be turned on and off at the player's will, but is disabled by default), encouraging the player to find alternate weapons and techniques.

Interspersed with human adventure are levels in which the player controls Kong himself, traversing Skull Island's unique geography, battling various giant monsters while defending Ann. The Kong levels take place in a third-person view, as the player directs Kong to punch, grab and use objects/corpses as weapons. He can also bite, climb, charge, hurl enemies and even pound his chest to go into fury mode. When Kong is sent into fury mode, the sky becomes tinted with a golden hue and Kong becomes more powerful and less vulnerable to attack. Many of the Kong sequences fulfill the role of boss fights, as the giant ape is able to effectively battle the gigantic creatures that Jack's weapons cannot harm.

The game features an alternate ending where Kong can survive the Empire State Building battle. The ending was approved by Peter Jackson. To unlock the alternate ending, players must complete the entire game and then go back and play through various maps and earn a total of 250,000 points. It can also be accessed by using the cheat codes.

== Plot ==
On October 12, 1933, the Venture arrives at Skull Island. Lifeboats containing the cast, crew, and sailors are dispatched to the island. Stormy seas carry the lifeboat with Preston (Colin Hanks), Jimmy (Jamie Bell), and Lumpy (Andy Serkis) in a different direction. The one with Jack Driscoll (Adrien Brody), Carl Denham (Jack Black), Ann Darrow (Naomi Watts), and Hayes (Evan Parke) smashes into a chunk of rock, killing sailor Briggs.

Hayes fires a distress signal, prompting Captain Englehorn (Thomas Kretschmann) to look for them by plane and drop ammo supplies. After fighting off giant crabs, the group traverses the island, battling vicious predators such as giant megapedes, scorpio-pedes, and Terapusmordax, and eventually splits up as they make their way toward a massive wall looming in the distance. Navigating through a seemingly abandoned village, Jack and Ann are captured by the island natives.

Tied to a stake, Jack watches the natives offer Ann to Kong as a sacrifice. Carl unties Jack, and they chase through the jungle, encountering pack-hunting Venatosaurus along the way. Jack and Carl eventually reunite with Hayes. They soon find Preston, Lumpy, Jimmy, and other sailors crossing a bridge, but a Vastatosaurus rex attacks them. Lumpy is killed as the others fall into the ravine or get to the other side. Jack is separated from Carl and Hayes, who tell him to continue looking for Ann. Jack eventually finds Ann, but a giant Terapusmordax kidnaps her. Kong eventually saves Ann. Meanwhile, Jack regroups with Carl and Hayes in a large canyon, where a herd of Brontosaurus is passing through. During their escape, another V-Rex makes the Brontosaurus stampede. The three barely manage to escape the massive predator. Later, they save Jimmy, who reveals everyone else is dead. While traveling on a raft, two V-Rexes pursue the team down the rapids. Before they can be devoured, Kong arrives with Ann. Kong kills the V-Rexes. The team traverses a swamp, and soon crosses a log before Kong appears and tips them into a gorge. Carl's camera is destroyed, and he gives up, while Jack, Jimmy, and Hayes keep pursuing Ann.

Jack eventually saves Ann from a V-Rex, and the party searches for a stretch of water where Englehorn can land, eventually finding one. Englehorn lands but must take flight as a V-Rex arrives and chases the group. Ann signals for Kong to come while Jack distracts the V-Rex. When Kong arrives, the dinosaur charges at him and inadvertently steps on Hayes, killing him. Jack and Jimmy fight raptors, return to the stretch of water, and find the seaplane. Jimmy leaves with Englehorn, and Jack climbs up into the mountains to save Ann.

Jack ascends the mountain, where scavenging Skin-birds roost among the cliffs. He eventually reaches Kong's lair and rescues Ann while Kong fights cave serpents. Kong gives chase to the fleeing pair, who return to the native village. After leaving the jungle, the natives capture Ann again, but Kong saves her. He then heads for the shore, and the sailors gas him to sleep. Denham takes Kong to New York City and displays him on Broadway. Kong escapes and rampages through New York. He eventually finds Ann and takes her up the Empire State Building. He tries to fight off biplanes but is eventually shot down. Carl stands beside Kong's body and says, "It wasn't the airplanes. It was Beauty that killed the Beast."

An alternate ending is possible. If the player defeats enough biplanes as Kong, the army sets up searchlights around the building so the biplanes can get clearer shots at Kong, causing Jack and Englehorn to appear in the Venture's seaplane. The player switches to Jack, who uses the seaplane's machine gun to take out the searchlights and shoot down the remaining biplanes to protect Kong. Although emergency searchlights are set up, Kong climbs down the Empire State Building. The Venture takes Kong aboard and safely returns him to Skull Island. On board the seaplane, Ann sees Kong one last time. The seaplane then returns to the Venture as it departs.

== Release ==
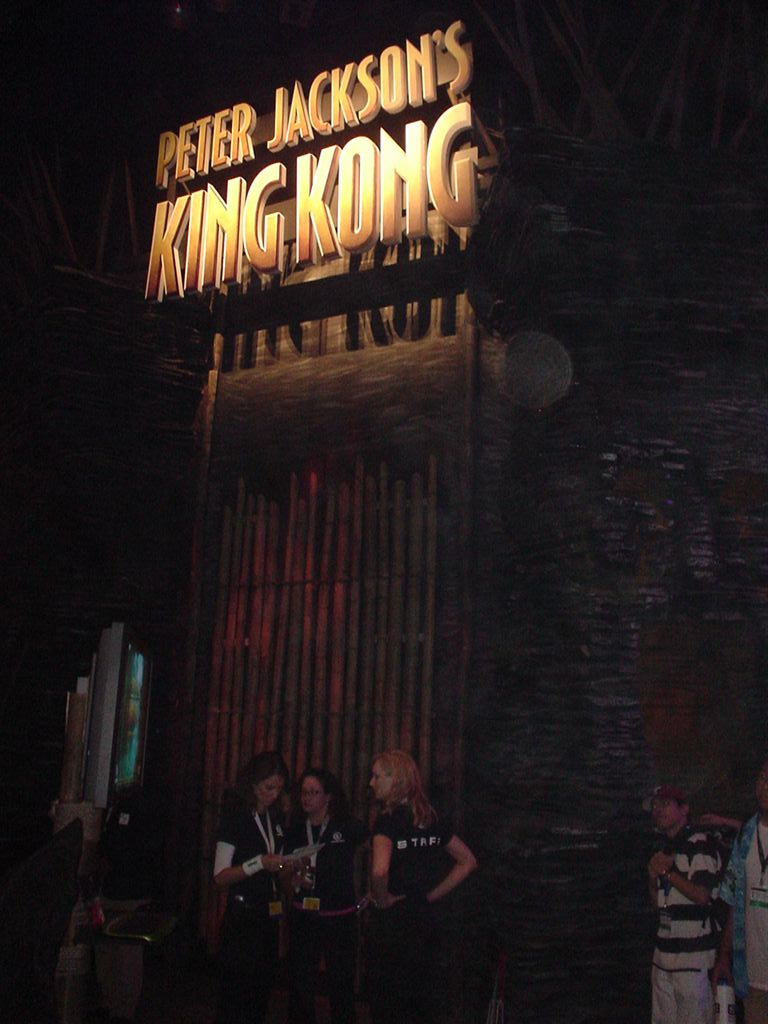
Ubisoft promoted the game at the 2005 E3.

The Xbox 360 release features improved graphics and audio over the sixth-generation console releases. The second PC version, known as the "Gamer's Edition" (originally only available with select graphics cards and later offered on game download services), also includes these improved features.

The "Special Edition" version of the game was available for a limited time. Along with the two standard game discs, included are a bonus disc, containing concept art and a screensaver, and a making-of disc, containing a featurette with Peter Jackson. There was an error in the printing of the discs and the disc labelled "Making of" was actually the "Bonus" disc and vice versa. The "Signature Edition" also comes with a Topps trading card of King Kong, a code for a downloadable ringtone, and a cover signed by Peter Jackson. In 2019, Microsoft added the Xbox 360 version to the Xbox One backwards compatible library.

The Xbox 360 digital version was delisted from the Xbox Marketplace sometime between 14–15 June 2015. (Note: Last known date available for purchase on Xbox Marketplace.) (Note: Earliest date that the game was delisted from the Xbox Marketplace.)

=== Technical issues ===
Symptomatic of early seventh-generation console games, the Xbox 360 version is only set up for HDTV, leaving the image on standard-definition TVs very dark and unsatisfactory for gameplay. As a result, Ubisoft recommended fans buy the Xbox version until a fix for the problem was produced. The patch was eventually released. The Xbox version is not backwards compatible with the Xbox 360.

Two different versions of the game were released for the PC. The Signature Edition of the game utilizes the StarForce copy protection system, which may cause unforeseen difficulties for players, especially those using Windows XP. No patch has been released by the publisher to remedy this problem. The Gamer's Edition of the game is DRM-free and is playable on Windows Vista and Windows 7 with no issues.

== Reception ==
=== Initial reviews ===
Reception

Aggregate scores
| Aggregator | Score |
|---|---|
| GameRankings | PS2: 82% Xbox: 81.56% GC: 80.63% X360: 79.99% PC: 78% GBA: 61.82% PSP: 56.21% DS: 25.14% |
| Metacritic | PS2: 82/100; Xbox: 82/100; GC: 81/100; X360: 80/100; PC: 77/100; GBA: 59/100; PSP: 56/100; DS: 28/100 |

Review scores
| Publication | Score |
|---|---|
| Edge | 8/10 |
| GameSpot | 8.2/10 |
| GameSpy | 3.5/5 |
| GamesTM | 6/10 |
| GameTrailers | 8.3/10 |
| GameZone | 8.5/10 |
| IGN | 8/10 |
| Nintendo Power | 9.0/10 |
| PlayStation Official Magazine – UK | 9/10 |
| Official U.S. PlayStation Magazine | 4.5/5 |
| Official Xbox Magazine (US) | 9/10 |
| PC Format | 80% |
| PC Gamer (UK) | 84% |
| PC Gamer (US) | 77% |
| PC Zone | 8.3/10 |
| PlayStation: The Official Magazine | 9/10 |

Peter Jackson's King Kong was a commercial success, selling more than 4.5 million copies by the end of March 2006. The PlayStation 2 version received a "Platinum" sales award from the Entertainment and Leisure Software Publishers Association (ELSPA), indicating sales of at least 300,000 copies in the United Kingdom.

The PC and console versions received positive reviews, with critics praising the game's immersive environments, action sequences, and ability to play as two protagonists throughout the game. The Nintendo DS version was widely panned by reviewers because of bugs and glitches, poor level design and enemy AI. It was listed in the "Flat-Out Worst Game" list of GameSpot's Best & Worst of 2005. The PSP version received mixed reception, mainly for a shorter length, as well as cut down features from the console and PC versions.

Non-video game publications gave the game generally positive reviews as well. The New York Times gave it a favorable review and wrote that "the sense of immersion is increased by the game's first-person perspective and an absence of on-screen clutter. There is no health gauge blocking your view; if a dinosaur bites you, your vision blurs, indicating that one more bite will kill you". The A.V. Club gave it a B+ and called it "an instant classic". The Sydney Morning Herald gave it three-and-a-half stars out of five and said of the game: "With a rather abrupt final sequence it does seem to rush to its climax, but despite its brevity, this is an unforgettable trip through the realm of Kong". Detroit Free Press gave the Xbox 360 version three stars out of four and called it "a decent effort", noting the game having cinematic feel and production values of a big-budget film. Maxim, however, gave the PSP version a score of four out of ten; the magazine commended an addition of a two-player co-op mode, but was critical to its controls.

=== Retrospectives ===
King Kong has seen lasting positive reception, particularly when compared to other film tie-in games, and is considered by some to be ahead of its time. The game's success has partly been attributed to the involvement of Michel Ancel, creator of the Rayman series and Beyond Good and Evil. Polygon's Xalavier Nelson Jr. called King Kong "the most innovative game of its console generation" through its cinematic quality, gameplay systems, minimal HUD, and focus on player freedom within scripted sequences. He also praised the visuals as being "better designed and executed than they have any right to be in a licensed product from 2005". Jade King of TheGamer concurred, writing the game was in many ways ahead of its time, including its "willing to usurp trends and try new things". She commended the "constant mixture of horror and action" gameplay as having "a profound sense of immersion [...] that still feels refreshing despite the game pushing two decades old." Conversely, she felt the Kong levels devolved the game into "a scrappy brawler with dodgy platforming or combat arenas conquered through mashing whatever buttons feel right".

Screen Rant's Cameron Koch lauded King Kong's "impressive visuals" and having a "big-budget, cinematic feel that isn't often seen in licensed games", though similarly criticized the Kong levels for their camera angles, platforming, and combat. Ultimately, he wrote it was "most certainly the best Kong game to date" and "one of the best film licensed video games of the last two decades". Writing for CBR, Vladimir Olivares wrote King Kong was "one of the finest examples of a tie-in movie game". He commended the lighting and environments as holding up well and heightening immersion for the player, and further praised the creativity in combat. He did, however, feel that the game's levels were repetitive, and thought the one set in New York City felt unfinished. GamesRadar+'s Ali Jones noted players' comparisons of King Kong to the 2023 game Skull Island: Rise of Kong, which was panned for its gameplay and visuals. He thought the 2005 game "looks better at pretty much every turn" and that the Kong levels alone outshone the entirety of Rise of Kong.

=== Accolades ===
King Kong received multiple awards and nominations.

| Date | Award | Category | Recipient(s) and nominee(s) | Result | Ref. |
|---|---|---|---|---|---|
| 10 December 2005 | 2005 Spike Video Game Awards | Best Action Game | Peter Jackson's King Kong: The Official Game of the Movie | Nominated | |
| 10 December 2005 | 2005 Spike Video Game Awards | Designer of the Year | Michel Ancel | Nominated | |
| 10 December 2005 | 2005 Spike Video Game Awards | Best Cast | Peter Jackson's King Kong: The Official Game of the Movie | Won | |
| 10 December 2005 | 2005 Spike Video Game Awards | Best Video Game Based on a Movie | Peter Jackson's King Kong: The Official Game of the Movie | Won | |
| 10 December 2005 | 2005 Spike Video Game Awards | Best Performance by a Female | Naomi Watts as Ann Darrow | Nominated | |
| 10 December 2005 | 2005 Spike Video Game Awards | Best Performance by a Male | Jack Black as Carl Denham | Won | |
| 17 December 2005 | 10th Satellite Awards | Outstanding Game Based on a Previous Medium | Peter Jackson's King Kong: The Official Game of the Movie | Nominated | |
| 9 February 2006 | 9th Annual Interactive Achievement Awards | Outstanding Achievement in Art Direction | Peter Jackson's King Kong: The Official Game of the Movie | Nominated | |
| 9 February 2006 | 9th Annual Interactive Achievement Awards | Outstanding Achievement in Game Design | Peter Jackson's King Kong: The Official Game of the Movie | Nominated | |
| 9 February 2006 | 9th Annual Interactive Achievement Awards | Outstanding Achievement in Sound Design | Peter Jackson's King Kong: The Official Game of the Movie | Nominated | |
| 9 February 2006 | 9th Annual Interactive Achievement Awards | Outstanding Achievement in Story and Character Development | Peter Jackson's King Kong: The Official Game of the Movie | Nominated | |
| 2 May 2006 | 32nd Saturn Awards | Best Video Game Release (Fantasy) | Peter Jackson's King Kong: The Official Game of the Movie | Nominated | |
