= Walter Melon (TV series) =

- Series screenshot
- Based on: Achille Talon by Greg
- Directed by: Bruno Bianchi
- Voices of: Brian George; Michael McConnohie (season 1); Lee Tockar (season 2); Francine Elcar; Jeremiah Nagle (season 1); Samuel Vincent (season 2)
- Composers: Haim Saban; Shuki Levy; (as Michel Dax)
- Countries of origin: France; United States
- Original language: French
- No. of seasons: 2
- No. of episodes: 52 (104 segments)

Production
- Executive producers: Jacqueline Tordjman; Vincent Chalvon-Demersay; Sandy Ross
- Producer: Bruno Bianchi
- Running time: 22 minutes
- Production companies: Saban Entertainment; Saban International Paris; ARD/Degeto; Scottish Television Enterprises

Original release
- Network: Fox Kids (international); France 2 and Canal+ (France); ITV (CITV) (UK); Der Kinderkanal (Germany)
- Release: September 3, 1997 – 1998

Walter Melon (French: Achille Talon) is an animated television series, loosely adapted from the Franco-Belgian comic Achille Talon.

A co-production between Saban International Paris, ARD/Degeto, France 2 and Scottish Television Enterprises with the participation of Canal+, Walter Melon aired in the United States on Fox Family from 1998 to 1999. In the UK, the series was broadcast on CITV (via Scottish Television), and later reran on Fox Kids. Each episode consists of two shorter adventures, and a total of 52 episodes were produced. Ownership of the series passed to Disney in 2001 when Disney acquired Fox Kids Worldwide, which also includes Saban Entertainment.

== Plot ==
Walter Melon and his assistant Bitterbug run a company as "heroes for hire". Whenever people get in trouble, go missing, or fall victim to a villains' latest scheme, Melon and Bitterbug (Lefuneste) take their places temporarily where Walter does the hero character and Bitterbug does the sidekick character. In the show, Walter and Bitterbug replaced spoofs of characters from pop culture and their occasional sidekicks that include but are not limited to Superman, Batman and Robin, Spider-Man, Hulk and Rick Jones, James Bond, Indiana Jones, Kirk and Spock, Luke Skywalker and Han Solo, Tarzan, Robin Hood and Little John, Max Rockatansky, D'artagnan and one of The Three Musketeers, Little Red Riding Hood, Power Rangers members Jason Lee Scott and Billy Cranston, the Terminator, Jack Driscoll and Carl Denham, Fox Mulder, John Rambo, Aladdin, Pinocchio and Jiminy Cricket, Peter Pan and Wendy Darling, Dr. Alan Grant, Emmett Brown and Marty McFly, Hercules, Christopher Columbus, two of the Teenage Mutant Ninja Turtles, Frankenstein's monster and Victor Frankenstein, Count Dracula, The Invisible Man, Dr. Jekyll, and Casper the Friendly Ghost. Unlike most heroes, Walter is a dim-witted, overweight jolly French American time traveler with a large melon-shaped nose and a lot of luck, but nobody ever notices the apparent change in appearance, with his character's apparent weight gain merely being commented on immediately after his arrival and subsequently ignored (such as asking if the RoboCop parody had too much oil or if D'artagnan accidentally swallowed a bell at Notre-Dame).

When he impersonates the heroes, he fights Sneero (le méchant), the main antagonist of the series who represents the main villain of the parody universe that include but are not limited to Lex Luthor, Joker, Doctor Octopus, Leader, Darth Vader, the Sheriff of Nottingham, Cardinal Richelieu, the Big Bad Wolf, Rita Repulsa, T-1000, King Kong, Cigarette Smoking Man, the Big Bad Wolf, Jafar, Tromboni, Captain Hook, Shredder, and Mr. Hyde.

Additionally, Walter is sometimes partnered with Amelia, a woman who represents the heroines, token female characters, female sidekicks, and love interests of the story that include but are not limited to Lois Lane, Catwoman, Mary Jane Watson, Betty Ross, Princess Leia, Jane Porter, Maid Marian, Ann Darrow, the Blue Fairy, Tinker Bell, April O'Neil, the Bride of Frankenstein. When some of Amelia's characters, Melon would comment that he never gets the girl and sometimes makes a follow-up comment.

In the second season in order to make the show educational, Walter and Bitterbug would receive cross-time distress messages from historical figures such as George Washington, Marco Polo, Thomas Edison, Lewis and Clark, Georges Méliès, and the Apollo 11 astronauts, rather than fictional characters, unlike the first season.

== Episodes ==
=== Season One ===
1. "Marzipan the Apeman/Goldenrod"
2. "The Melon Strikes Back/The Glob"
3. "Star Blecch/Splatman and Rubin"
4. "The Mark of Zero/Windiana Bones and the Temp of Doom"
5. "Molasses Park/Superguy"
6. "The Far Out Flower Rangers/Dobin Wood"
7. "Groggy XII/Peter Pun"
8. "Mutiny on the Bouncy/Moperminator"
9. "Big Red Riding Hood and the Pizzas/The Stout Musketeer"
10. "Melon Impossible/Robomelon"
11. "The Incredible Bulk/Noman The Barbarian"
12. "A Fistful of Melon/Melon in Blunderland"
13. "Whambo/Gums"
14. "The Hard Labours of Hercules/The Hound of the Basketvilles"
15. "Back to Melon's Blundering Future/New Age Pizza Lovin' Tae Kwon Do Tortoises"
16. "Incompetence Day/King-Gong"
17. "Ben Hurdy-Gurdy/The Jungle Schnook"
18. "Frank & Stein/The Derisible Man"
19. "Shalien/Dance A Lot"
20. "T.E.T. The Temporary Extraterrestrial/Arachnoman"
21. "Squashymodo/Walter, The Jolly Ghost"
22. "Top Fun/Gnocchio"
23. "Melon of Snoz/Fat Max - The Roo's Revenge"
24. "The Vampire Bites Back/Christopher Columsy"
25. "Hex Files/Kerazy Kid"
26. "Dr. Jiggle and Mr. Snide/Palladin & The Capricious Lamp"

=== Season Two ===
1. "Walter XIV, The Fun King/Melon on the Mountain"
2. "Houston, the Melon has Landed/Walterius Caesar"
3. "Attila, the Melon/Melon Takes Flight"
4. "Vini Vici Da Vinci/Go West Young Melon"
5. "Ponce de Melon/Rough Rider Melon"
6. "Melon at the O.K. Corral/Melon Lights the Way"
7. "You Reykjavik and I’ll Rake Mine/Caveman for Hire"
8. "Charlemagne/King Walter, The Melon-Hearted"
9. "And Yet It Make Your Head Spin/Melon of Liberty"
10. "Maestro Melon/Johan Melonberg"
11. "Hot Air Melon/Sir Francis Melon"
12. "Francisco Vasquez Melon de Colonado/Samurai Melon"
13. "Walter Casanova, Lady Killer/Walter Picasso"
14. "A Napoleon With Melon on Top/Hula Hula Melon"
15. "Serf-City Serfitude/Walter Crockett"
16. "The 7th Melon of the World/Queen Elizabeth I & Sir Walter Melon"
17. "Alexander the Greatest/Alexander Graham Melon"
18. "Marathon Melon/It's Melon by George"
19. "Melon of Arabia/Chicken Curie with Melon"
20. "Melon, I Presume/Walter Melonbal"
21. "Walter Hears Voices/There's a Trick in It"
22. "Once Upon a Melon/You're Driving Me Crazy"
23. "Melon of the Amazon/Melon, Heal Thyself"
24. "Pasteurized Melon/Walter Vidocq-The Adventurer With The Big Heart"
25. "Walter Desmoulins, Hero of French Revolution/Mephisneereles"
26. "E=Melon2 / That's Usin' Your Noodle, Walter Polo"

== Cast ==
- Brian George - Walter Melon, Explorer #1 (in "Marzipan the Ape Man"), Explorer #2 (in "Marzipan the Ape Man"), Chaise Pond (in "Goldenrod"), Pew (in "Goldenrod"), Soldier (in "The Mark of Zero"), Pita Pocket's Sidekick (in "The Far Out Flower Rangers"), Gordo (in "Groggy XII"), Jim Yelps (in "Melon Impossible"), Cousteau (in "Gums"), Villagers (in "Frank & Stein"), Artist (in "The Derisible Man"), Teapot Genie (in "Palladin & The Capricious Lamp")
- Jeremiah Nagle - Bitterbug (season 1), Nerd (in "The Glob")
- Samuel Vincent - Bitterbug (season 2)
- Michael McConnohie - Sneero (season 1), Professor, Announcer (in "Windiana Bones and the Temp of Doom"), Mason (in "The Far Out Flower Rangers"), Brother (in "A Fistful of Melon"), Van Gough (in "New Age Pizza Lovin' Tae Kwon Do Tortoises"), Reporter (in "Incompetence Day"), Steve (in "King Gong"), Centurion (in "Ben Hurdy-Gurdy"), Julius Iglesias (in "Ben Hurdy-Gurdy"), Parrot (in "The Jungle Schnook"), John Smith (in "Christopher Columsy"), Assistant Director Skintrop (in "Hex Files"), Eddie the Yeti (in "Dr. Jiggle and Mr. Snide")
- Lee Tockar - Sneero (season 2)
- Francine Elcar - Amelia

=== Additional voices ===
- Robert Axelrod - Laughing Lads (in "Dobin Wood")
- Steve Blum - Franz Polo (in "Melon Strikes Back"), Steve McKing (in "The Glob"), General #1 (in "Whambo"), Rebel #1 (in "Whambo"), Rebel #2 (in "Whambo"), Hercules (in "The Hard Labours of Hercules"), Minotaur (in "The Hard Labours of Hercules"), Blabbela (in "The Jungle Schnook"), Pet Shop Owner (in "The Jungle Schnook"), Dr. Stein (in "Frank & Stein")
- Steve Bulen - Oleo Cannoli (in "Melon Strikes Back"), Droid (in "Melon Strikes Back"), French Teacher (in "The Glob")
- Cam Clarke as Mayor (in "Gums"), Picasso (in "New Age Pizza Lovin' Tae Kwon Do Tortoises"), Stonecold (in "New Age Pizza Lovin' Tae Kwon Do Tortoises"), Sewer Worker (in "New Age Pizza Lovin' Tae Kwon Do Tortoises")
- Richard Epcar - Robotroll (in "Robomelon"), Police Officer (in "Robomelon")
- Barbara Goodson - Commercial Announcer (in "Shalien"), Daycare Announcer (in "Shalien"), Glenda (in "Melon of Snoz")
- Peter Greenwood - Fat Max (in "Fat Max - The Roo's Revenge")
- R. Martin Klein - Jack (in "King Gong"), Resort Manager (in "King Gong")
- Lex Lang - Grogy Barbacoa (in "Groggy XII"), Agent Muldy (in "Hex Files"),
- Douglas Lee - Chief Broody (in "Gums"), Squinter (in "New Age Pizza Lovin' Tae Kwon Do Tortoises"), Doo Wop (in "New Age Pizza Lovin' Tie Kwon Do Tortoises"), Lieutenant Bebop (in "Shalien"), Park Ranger Snozzie (in "Melon of Oz")
- Wendee Lee - Peter Pun (in "Peter Pun")
- Daran Norris - Tape Voice (in "Melon Impossible"), Flash (in "Robomelon"), Protocop (in "Robomelon"), Corporal Fixey (in "Shalien"), Dance A Lot (in "Dance A Lot"), Irving (in "Dance A Lot"), Henry Jiggle (in "Dr. Jiggle and Mr. Snide")
- Tony Pope - Sergeant Gordito (in "The Mark of Zero"), Soldier (in "The Mark of Zero"), Mad Hatter (in "Melon in Blunderland"), Baloney (in "The Jungle Schnook"), Igorbeaver (in "Frank & Stein"), Villagers (in "Frank & Stein")
- Jan Rabson - Scarecrow (in "Melon of Snoz")
- Michael Sorich - King Richard the Artichoke (in "Dobin Wood"), Laughing Lads (in "Dobin Wood"), White Rabbit (in "Melon of Blunderland"), Christopher Columsy (in "Christopher Columsy"), Genie (in "Palladin & The Capricious Lamp")
- Doug Stone - Zero (in "The Mark of Zero"), Bird (in "The Mark of Zero")
- Tom Wyner - Sordon (in "The Far Out Flower Rangers"), Announcer (in "Groffy XII")

== Crew ==
- Bruno Bianchi - Director & Producer
- Jacqueline Tordjman, Vincent Chalvon-Demersay, Sandy Ross - Executive Producers
- Jamie Simone - Casting & Voice Director
- Micheal Dax - Music
- Natalie Altmann - Script editor
