= Greg Broadmore =

New Zealand designer, artist, and writer

Greg Broadmore (born 1972) is a New Zealand concept designer, artist, writer and sculptor based in Wellington. He is the creator of Dr Grordbort's, and has worked as a designer, artist and writer at The Lord of the Rings film franchise director Peter Jackson's award-winning special effects and prop company, Weta Workshop since 2002. He was the lead concept designer on District 9 and a concept designer and sculptor on King Kong, The Chronicles of Narnia: The Lion, The Witch and the Wardrobe and The Adventures of Tintin. Broadmore was also one of the illustrators and concept writers for Weta Workshop's first publication, The World of Kong: A Natural History of Skull Island.

== Early life ==
Broadmore was born in Whakatāne in 1972 and grew up obsessed with comic books, video games and Star Wars. He was rejected by two New Zealand art schools and spent the next seven years living on social welfare while he played in punk rock bands.

Broadmore moved to Wellington in 2000, where he worked as a children's book illustrator, illustrating over 30 books. After the first Lord of the Rings film was released in 2001, Broadmore sent his portfolio to Weta Workshop creator and head Sir Richard Taylor, who hired him based on the strength of his work. He began working for Weta Workshop as a designer and sculptor in 2002.

== Career ==
=== Dr Grordbort's Infallible Aether Oscillators ===
Broadmore is best known for his work on the universe of Dr Grordbort's, which he created in-between working on King Kong and District 9. Broadmore designed a series of retro-futuristic ray guns, which he showed to Weta Workshop special effects supervisor Sir Richard Taylor, who saw their potential as a line of collectibles based within their own universe.

In an interview with science fiction blog io9.com, Broadmore says his vision was to "satirize pulp fiction that spans the era from the 1890s to the 1940s". Dr Grordbort's has been featured in other technology magazines including Wired magazine and Boing Boing. In the Wired interview, Greg described Dr Grordbort's as "a parallel universe that uses the late 1800s through to the 1930s as a jumping off point" in terms of inspiration for the world.

In 2011, Broadmore's world of Dr Grordbort's appeared in White Cloud Worlds: An Anthology of Science Fiction and Fantasy Artwork from Aotearoa New Zealand. He was one of the New Zealand authors chosen to speak at the 2012 Frankfurt Book Fair keynote for his Dr Grordbort's books, Victory, Dr Grordbort's Contrapulatronic Dingus Directory and Triumph.

Also in 2011, Broadmore collaborated with Valve to bring current Dr. Grordbort creations and new weapon designs to the popular First-person shooter, Team Fortress 2. In the first update on July 20, 2011, two weapons, The Righteous Bison and the Cow Mangler 5000 were added, and attendees of the Weta booth at the 2011 San Diego Comic-Con could get a special code to get a Genuine variant of the Righteous Bison. A second update on December 15, 2011, added many other weapons and cosmetic items in the style of Dr. Grordbort.

In 2009, in partnership with Sir Richard Taylor and Tania Rodger, Broadmore launched an internationally touring exhibition, Dr Grordbort's Exceptional Exhibition, which has toured in Hong Kong, Chengdu in China, Germany, France, Switzerland and New Zealand.

In 2018, Weta Workshop's game division released the augmented reality game Dr. Grordbort's Invaders for the Magic Leap platform.

== Other career highlights ==
Broadmore has co-designed public art pieces around New Zealand including the Rocky Horror Show/Richard O'Brien tribute sculpture located in the south end of Victoria St. in Hamilton. The bronze cast statue, called Riff Raff, celebrates the birthplace of the Rocky Horror Picture Show and pays tribute to the former home of The Embassy Theatre, where scriptwriter Richard O'Brien cut hair from 1954 to 1964.

In 2006 he co-designed and art directed the Tripod Sculpture in downtown Wellington that commemorates the local screen industry.

One of his other public collaborations is the design of the ceiling of the recently revamped Roxy Cinema in Wellington, which was reopened in 2011. Broadmore designed the ceiling, which was covered by a mural featuring a marauding robot, a cluster of flying rocket girls and the landscape of planet Venus. The Sunday Star-Times feature writer Grant Smithies described the mural as "a sepia-tone illustration from an old Jules Verne novel, or perhaps a long-lost dream sequence from Fritz Lang's classic 1927 silent film, Metropolis". Broadmore also designed a "cloning machine" for BATS Theatre, which featured as the main prop in a play called Gene Pool, his first theatrical collaboration.

== Bibliography ==
- 2008 Doctor Grordbort's Contrapulatronic Dingus Directory
- 2009 Victory: Science Adventure Violence for Young Men and Literate Women
- 2012 Triumph: Unnecessarily Violent Tales of Science Adventure for the Simple and Unfortunate
- 2014 Onslaught: Excessive Space Violence for Girls & Boys

== Filmography ==
- 2009 Lead Concept Designer – District 9
- 2005 Concept Designer – King Kong
- 2005 Concept Designer – The Chronicles of Narnia: The Lion, the Witch and the Wardrobe
- 2007 Concept Designer – Black Sheep
- 2009 Concept Designer – Avatar
- 2011 Concept Designer – Tintin
- 2011 Exec Producer – Dr. Grordbort's presents" the Deadliest game (short film)

== Cameo roles ==
Appearing as Greg Broadmore in:

- 2011 Ray Harryhausen: Special Effects Titan (documentary)
- 2009 Conception and Design: Creating the World of 'District 9' (short)
- 2006 Recreating the Eighth Wonder: The Making of 'King Kong' (documentary)
- 2006 Skull Island: A Natural History (documentary short)
