= Jack Driscoll (character) =

Fictional character in the King Kong franchise

- King Kong character
- Driscoll, as portrayed by Bruce Cabot in King Kong (1933)
- First appearance: King Kong (1933)
- Last appearance: King Kong (2005)
- Created by: Edgar Wallace; Merian C. Cooper
- Portrayed by: Bruce Cabot; Adrien Brody
- Voiced by: Randy Hamilton

Jack Driscoll (credited as John Driscoll in the 1933 film) is a fictional character in the King Kong franchise. In the original 1933 film he was the first mate of the ship named the Venture, while in its 2005 remake he was a playwright (the less faithful 1976 remake had an analogous character named Jack Prescott, played by Jeff Bridges). He was played by Bruce Cabot in the original and by Adrien Brody in the remake. In both versions he is one of the main heroes of the story, a man who is on a ship heading for the mysterious Skull Island, where Carl Denham intends to make a film. On the way, Driscoll falls in love with the actress Ann Darrow. When she is kidnapped by a giant ape named Kong on the island, Driscoll rescues her after helping to lead a search. Beyond these facts, his characterization is quite different in the two films.

Driscoll is a supporting character in Kong: King of Skull Island, an "authorized" illustrated-novel that continues the Kong story in 1957. Driscoll also appears in the 1998 animated film The Mighty Kong, voiced by Randy Hamilton. Driscoll is also a playable character in the video game Peter Jackson's King Kong: The Official Game of the Movie, along with Kong himself.

== 1933 film ==
In the 1933 film, Driscoll is a tough sailor, the Venture's first mate, who disdains having women on ships, considering even their mere presence to be a "nuisance". He says as much to Ann Darrow, but despite this early encounter, and while on the ship, Driscoll becomes more tender and develops an infatuation with her. Ann is at first surprised by Driscoll's interest, but she accepts. Shortly after, Ann is kidnapped by the island natives and sacrificed to Kong, but Driscoll, Denham and several other crew members charge into Skull Island to rescue her. It is eventually Driscoll who saves Ann from Kong's clutches, but the ape gives chase until Denham knocks him unconscious with a gas bomb.

Having returned to New York City, Driscoll and Ann continue to work for Denham as Kong is chained to a stage and shown to live audiences. During the show, Denham gives Driscoll credit for coming to Ann's rescue, and it is revealed that Ann and Driscoll are to be married. Kong breaks free, however, and despite Driscoll's attempts to keep Ann secure by taking her to a hotel room and trying to fight Kong after the beast reaches through the window, Ann is once again kidnapped. Upon hearing Kong is climbing the Empire State Building, Jack suggests to police for army airplanes to shoot Kong off the building, without hitting Ann. Upon seeing the planes arrive, Jack becomes agitated for Ann's safety and rushes to the top of the building. He reunites with Ann after Kong is shot off the building.

It is believed that the choice of actor Bruce Cabot to play Driscoll was in part due to his strong resemblance to popular heavyweight boxing champion Jack Dempsey, who at the time embodied the rugged, heroic male "ideal". The choice of the similar name "Jack Driscoll" is further indication that this was in fact the case.

== 2005 film ==
Driscoll, as portrayed by Adrien Brody in King Kong (2005)

The original Jack is divided into two separate characters in the 2005 film. His duties as first mate are transferred to Ben Hayes, portrayed by Evan Parke, while the character name and the function of Ann Darrow's romantic interest are given to a playwright who tries to write a screenplay for Carl, as a friend, played by Adrien Brody. This Jack Driscoll does not intend to join the expedition at all, but delivers the script to the ship before it departs. With limited time, however, Jack did not write nearly enough, and Carl, desperate for more, tricks him into staying on the ship as it leaves for Skull Island. Carl complains that he prefers the stage, but Carl retorts that "if you really loved it, you would have jumped".

As it turns out, Carl's struggling actress, Ann Darrow, had been very familiar with Carl's work beforehand, and admired Carl greatly. She is excited to meet him, but at first the relationship is awkward (owing in part to a case of mistaken identity on Ann's part). When writing the next part of the script with Carl, Jack decides to kill off the first mate. When Carl questions it, Jack replies, "That's assuming she knows who the first mate is". This is a reference to the 1933 film, in which Jack Driscoll was the first mate of the Venture. The two eventually grow closer, however, and Jack also reveals that he has begun writing a comedic play dedicated to Ann, as a sign that he has fallen in love with her (the dynamic from the original, in which Ann is told that women should not be on ships, is not actually said by Jack, but does appear in Carl's film, although as it turns out Jack's script had been altered by the actor, Bruce Baxter).

While writing the screenplay, Jack is the first to learn that Carl is taking the crew to an undiscovered island. When they reach the island, Ann is kidnapped by the native inhabitants as a sacrifice for Kong, and Jack sets out in search for her along with the rest of the crew. He shows both great amounts of courage and a single-minded determination to find and rescue Ann. Of the original party, he is the only member who survived the journey through the island (including attacks by dinosaurs, a giant fish, and giant insects) and did not return to the settlement without rescuing Ann, managing to retrieve her by himself.

Unlike the original, Jack did not continue with Carl or Ann after Kong was brought to New York, but rather continued with the comedy he had dedicated to Ann, nor does Carl give Jack credit as being the hero of the adventure at Skull Island. Jack does, however, come to fear that he has let Ann slip away from him.

Jack realizes before anyone else that Carl opening is heading for disaster, but cannot do anything to prevent it. Discovering that Kong actually recognizes him on sight — and is hellbent on killing him for taking Ann – Jack attempts to use that to draw Kong away from Times Square and away from crowds of bystanders. Jack is nearly killed for his heroic effort, but Ann approaches and stops Kong's rampage, saving Jack's life this time around.

Jack regains consciousness and rushes into the Empire State Building, taking an elevator to the top of the building. When Ann is alone on the Empire State Building after Kong has fallen, she and Jack embrace.

Jack is also a playable character in the video game Peter Jackson's King Kong: The Official Game of the Movie, along with Kong himself. In an alternate ending, he saves Kong during the Empire State Building shootout.

== Real-world history ==
With the 2005 film, the casting of Adrien Brody drew some criticism, reported by film critic Roger Ebert, because he was "not precisely hero material". Ebert defended that casting decision, saying Driscoll was just a writer who did not need "big muscles".

On the making of documentary, Adrien Brody commented that of all the films he had ever made, King Kong was the one for which he was most anticipating seeing the finished product.
