= The Mighty Kong =

- DVD cover
- Directed by: Art Scott
- Written by: William J. Keenan
- Based on: King Kong by Merian C. Cooper and Edgar Wallace
- Produced by: Denis deVallance; Lyn Henderson
- Starring: Dudley Moore; Jodi Benson; Randy Hamilton; William Sage; Jason Gray-Stanford; Richard Newman; Don Brown; Ian James Corlett; Michael Dobson; Paul Dobson
- Edited by: Tony Hayman
- Music by: David Siebels; Robert B. Sherman; Richard M. Sherman
- Production companies: L.A. Animation; Lana Productions; Hahn Shin Corporation (Animation Production)
- Distributed by: Legacy Releasing
- Release dates: May 29, 1998 (Los Angeles); June 16, 1998 (VHS)
- Running time: 73 minutes
- Countries: United States; South Korea
- Language: English

The Mighty Kong is a 1998 American animated monster musical film. It is an adaptation of the classic King Kong story, produced by Lana Productions and is the seventh entry in the King Kong franchise. Jodi Benson and Dudley Moore (in his final role before his death in 2002) headed its cast of voice actors. The film was animated overseas by the South Korean animation studios including Hahn Shin Corporation, and by Jade Animation in Hong Kong. It features original songs by the Sherman Brothers.

The film was initially given a limited theatrical release on May 29, 1998 in Los Angeles before being released on VHS on June 16, 1998 by Warner Home Video as a part of their 75th Anniversary promotion. It was released on DVD by TriCoast Worldwide in 2019 as a Manufacture-on-Demand (MOD) release that is only available through online stores. The film is currently available on multiple streaming platforms such as Tubi and Vimeo.

== Plot ==
Ann Darrow, a down-on-her-luck actress looking for work, meets film director Carl Denham/C.B., who offers her a job in a new film. They board the Venture to leave for the film shoot. Ann meets a sailor boy named Rick and his Monkey Chips, she later meets Jack Driscoll after he saved her from almost being crushed by cargo. They arrive at Skull island and after a run-in with the natives, they have Ann sacrificed to the giant gorilla King Kong who makes off with her into the jungle. Together, they fight a Tyrannosaurus, Pterodactylus and a Gigantophis. Jack rescues Ann and Kong becomes unconscious by a gas bomb.

The film then follows Kong's escape from C.B.'s theater and rampage of New York City. Kong takes Ann up on top of the Empire State Building with Jack in pursuit. The biplanes come and attack Kong with guns, but miss most of the time. When all the planes have been knocked down, the army sends two blimps with a net in between them to catch Kong. They catch him successfully. Kong tries to get out of the net, but the net rips and when Kong reaches for Ann, he falls from the net and plummets to the streets of New York. However, Kong survives the fall.

After surviving the fall, Kong was either allowed to roam free in a thousand acres of land in southern New Jersey, or released on a private island.

== Cast ==
- Dudley Moore as Carl Denham and King Kong
- Jodi Benson as Ann Darrow
- Randy Hamilton as Jack Driscoll
- William Hampden Sage, IV as Roscoe
- Jason Gray-Stanford as Ricky
- Richard Newman as Captain Englehorn

Additional voices are: William H. Sage IV, Don Brown, Ian James Corlett, Michael Dobson, Paul Dobson

== See also ==
- List of films featuring dinosaurs
