= The World of Kong =

2005 tie-in art book

- Author: Wētā Workshop (Note: Wētā Workshop as a whole is credited as the author; most of the text was written by designer Daniel Falconer.)
- Language: English
- Genre: Speculative evolution
- Publisher: Pocket Books
- Publication date: 2005
- Publication place: New Zealand
- Media type: Print (hardback)
- Pages: 224
- ISBN: 14-165-0519-9

The World of Kong: A Natural History of Skull Island is a 2005 art book released as a tie-in to the film King Kong (2005). The book is written in the form of a field guide and natural history of the version of Skull Island and its creatures as presented in the film.

== Summary ==
The World of Kong features a fictional natural history of the island of Skull Island, upon which much of the film King Kong (2005) takes place. The narrative in the book's introductory chapter presents the book as the result of Project Legacy, a series of seven zoological expeditions led by Carl Denham (played by Jack Black in the film) to the island between 1935 (two years after the film takes place) and 1948, when the island sank into the sea due to volcanic and geological activity. (Note: The sinking of the island is inspired by this plot point happening in the sequel to the original King Kong film, Son of Kong (1933).)

The book features extensive artwork and descriptions of the different animals catalogued during these expeditions, descendants of various prehistoric animals that at different times in the past migrated to the island. The version of Skull Island presented in The World of Kong is the richest version of the island in terms of the sheer number of animals, featuring animals that correspond to creatures in the original film and also introducing many new ones.

== Development ==
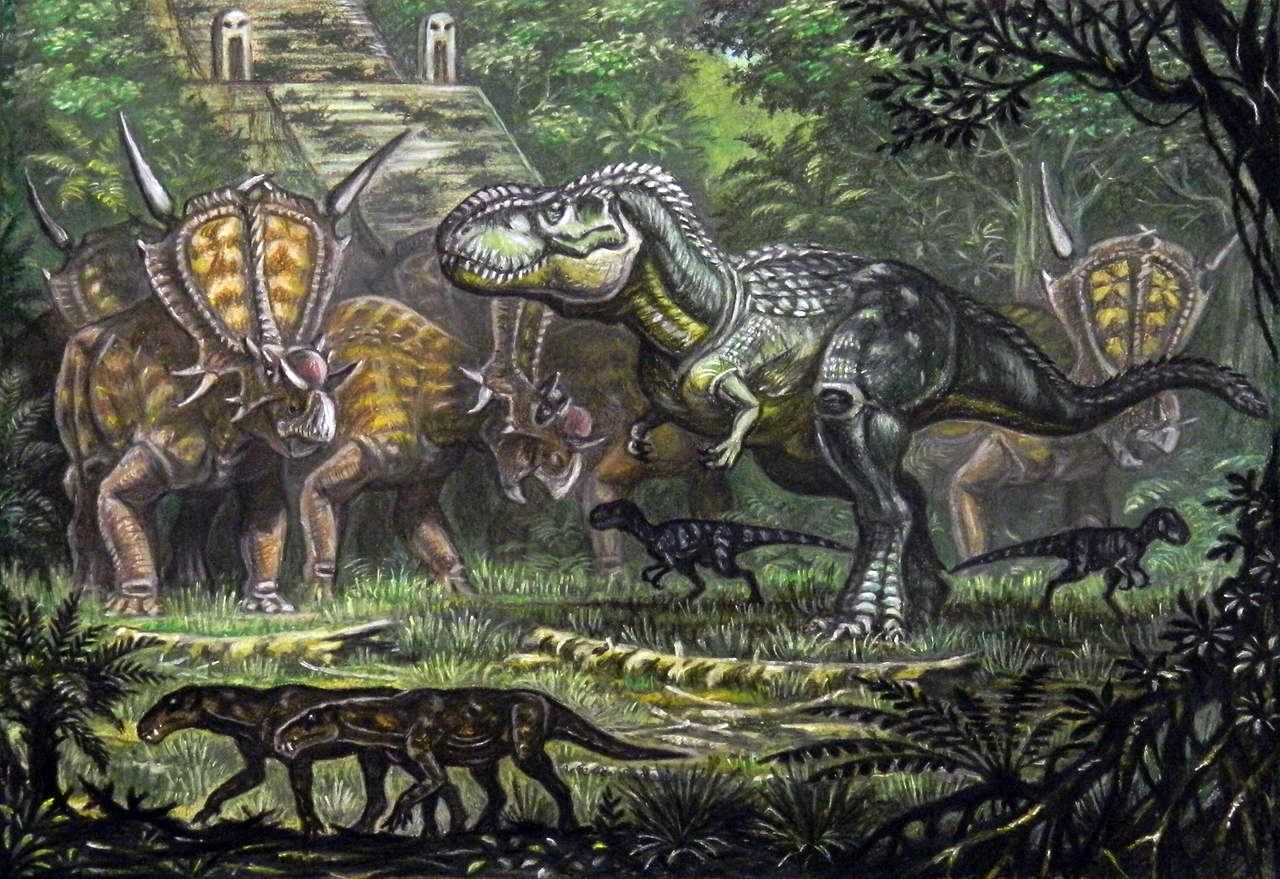
Fan art of creatures from Skull Island

The original King Kong (1933) features a set of surviving Mesozoic animals inhabiting the island of Skull Island. During the production of its remake King Kong (2005), the production team decided that the animals presented in the new film were to be descendants of Mesozoic animals who had evolved in the intervening millions of years, rather than evolutionary stagnant survivors. The design team at Wētā Workshop, responsible for the animal designs to be featured in the film, were inspired by the speculative evolution works of Dougal Dixon, especially his book The New Dinosaurs (1988), which speculated on what forms non-avian dinosaurs might have evolved into if they had not gone extinct at the end of the Cretaceous.

The designers at first pushed for colorful and feathery dinosaurs to reflect a more modern scientific understanding of dinosaurs but this idea was shot down by director Peter Jackson, who wished to keep the dinosaurs more dull and plain to keep them stylistically similar to those that appeared in the 1933 film. The Wētā designers created several hundred drawings and sculptures of creatures and a large number of designs never made it into the final film. Often aesthetics were favored over absolute realism; the design chosen for the Vastatosaurus rex (descendants of Tyrannosaurus rex) was for instance the design that looked the most monstrous and terrifying, rather than the one that looked the most like a real dinosaur. Early on in the process, there was also talk of having many of the dinosaurs be more upright, an outdated idea in-line with their appearance in the original film, but this idea was eventually scrapped. Creature designs were however also envisioned so that they would be biologically plausible. For instance, some design ideas for the Terapusmordax (a giant bat-like creature) depicted it as flying using back legs that had developed into wings, a design scrapped because it was deemed too unlikely.

The World of Kong, supervised by Peter Jackson, was one of several tie-in products released to accompany the film. It was published just before the film's premiere. The book served to highlight some of the vast amount of creature artwork created by Wētā Workshop for the film, much of which depicted creatures that had not made their way into King Kong. The choice was also made to write the book in the style of an in-universe field guide and natural history. According to Wētā designer Daniel Falconer, the team often envisions deep "fictional lore" surrounding their projects and designs but The World of Kong was one of the rare cases in which they were able to present that lore, which otherwise rarely "makes it out", in an entire book.
