= King Kong (2005 film) =

Film by Peter Jackson

- Theatrical release poster
- Directed by: Peter Jackson
- Screenplay by: Fran Walsh; Philippa Boyens; Peter Jackson
- Based on: King Kong by: Merian C. Cooper; Edgar Wallace
- Produced by: Jan Blenkin; Carolynne Cunningham; Fran Walsh; Peter Jackson
- Starring: Naomi Watts; Jack Black; Adrien Brody; Thomas Kretschmann; Colin Hanks; Jamie Bell; Andy Serkis
- Cinematography: Andrew Lesnie
- Edited by: Jamie Selkirk
- Music by: James Newton Howard
- Production companies: Universal Pictures; WingNut Films
- Distributed by: Universal Pictures
- Release dates: 5 December 2005 (New York City premiere); 13 December 2005 (New Zealand); 14 December 2005 (United States)
- Running time: 187 minutes
- Countries: New Zealand; United States
- Language: English
- Budget: $207 million
- Box office: $556.9 million

King Kong is a 2005 epic monster film directed, co-written, and produced by Peter Jackson. It is the ninth entry in the King Kong franchise and the second remake of the 1933 film of the same title, the first being the 1976 remake. The film stars Naomi Watts, Jack Black, Adrien Brody, Thomas Kretschmann, Colin Hanks, Jamie Bell, and Andy Serkis as the motion-capture performer of Kong. Set in 1933, it follows the story of an ambitious and unscrupulous filmmaker who tricks his cast and hired ship crew into travelling to the mysterious Skull Island, which is inhabited by evolved prehistoric creatures and a legendary giant gorilla known as King Kong.

Development began in early 1995, when Universal Pictures approached Jackson to direct the remake of the original 1933 film. The project stalled in early 1997, as several ape and giant monster-related films were under production at the time and Jackson planned to direct The Lord of the Rings film series instead. As the first two films in the Rings trilogy became commercially successful, Universal went back to Jackson in early 2003, expressing interest in restarting development on the project, to which Jackson eventually agreed. Filming for King Kong took place in New Zealand from September 2004 to March 2005. It was the most expensive film ever produced at the time of its release, as its budget climbed from an initial $150 million to a then record-breaking $207 million.

King Kong premiered at New York City on 5 December 2005, and was theatrically released in New Zealand on December 13 and in the United States on 14 December. The film received critical acclaim, and eventually appeared in several top ten lists for 2005; it was praised for the special effects, performances, sense of spectacle and comparison to the 1933 original, though some criticisms were raised over its 3-hour runtime. It was a commercial success, grossing over $557 million, and became the fourth-highest-grossing film in Universal Pictures history at that time and the fifth-highest-grossing film of 2005. It also generated $100 million in DVD sales upon its home video release in March 2006. It won three Academy Awards for Best Sound Editing, Best Sound Mixing and Best Visual Effects. A tie-in video game was released alongside the film, which also became a commercial and critical success.

== Plot ==
In 1933, during the Great Depression, struggling New York City vaudeville performer Ann Darrow is hired by financially troubled filmmaker Carl Denham to star in a film with actor Bruce Baxter. Ann hesitates to join the picture until she learns her favorite playwright, Jack Driscoll, is the screenwriter. Filming takes place on the SS Venture, a small cargo ship commanded by Captain Englehorn. Carl claims the Venture will sail to Singapore, but he actually intends to film the mysterious Skull Island. During the voyage, Ann and Jack fall in love.

The Venture becomes lost in fog and runs aground on Skull Island. Carl and others, including his film crew, consisting of cameraman Herb, assistant Preston, and boom operator Mike, explore the island and are attacked by natives who kill Mike and a crewman. Englehorn rescues Carl's group, but as they all prepare to leave, the natives secretly abduct Ann to offer her as a sacrifice to Kong, a 25-foot-tall (7.6 m) ape. Jack notices Ann's disappearance, and the crew returns to the island, but Kong flees with Ann into the jungle. Carl catches a glimpse of Kong and becomes determined to film him.

Englehorn organizes a rescue party led by his first mate, Hayes, and Jack, with Carl, Herb, Baxter, and Preston accompanying them. The party gets caught between a herd of grazing Brontosaurus and a pack of Utahraptor-like Venatosaurus hunting them, with Herb and several other men killed in the resulting stampede. Baxter and some rescue party members return to the ship while the others decide to continue their search for Ann. Meanwhile, Ann wins Kong over with her vaudeville routine skills, and begins to grasp his intelligence and capacity for emotion.

The remaining party members continue through the jungle when Kong attacks, killing Hayes and several more crew members, and making the others fall into a ravine where Carl loses his camera. Kong rescues Ann from three Tyrannosaurus-like Vastatosaurus rexes and brings her to his den in the mountains. Giant insects attack and kill the remaining members of the rescue party in the ravine, but Baxter and Englehorn rescue Preston, Carl, Jack, and Hayes' apprentice Jimmy. Jack searches for Ann alone, while Carl decides to capture Kong. Jack finds Kong's lair and escapes with Ann to where the crew is waiting to capture the pursuing Kong. As Ann begs the crew not to harm him, Kong kills several sailors, but is subdued when Carl knocks him out with chloroform.

In New York City, Carl presents "Kong, the Eighth Wonder of the World" on Broadway, starring Baxter and an imprisoned Kong. An anonymous chorus girl plays Ann, who refuses to take part in the performance. Agitated by the chorus girl not being Ann and flashes from cameras, Kong breaks free of the chains, wrecks the theater, and bursts out into the streets of New York in search of Ann, chasing Jack before encountering her again. The U.S. Army attacks, and Kong tries to get Ann and himself to safety by climbing to the top of the Empire State Building.

Six United States Navy biplanes arrive; Kong downs three of them, but is mortally wounded by the planes' gunfire and eventually falls from the building. As Jack reaches the top of the building to comfort and embrace Ann, civilians, policemen, and soldiers gather around the beast's corpse in the street. Carl makes his way through the crowd and takes one last look at the lifeless Kong. One bystander says the airplanes got him, and Carl sadly remarks, "It wasn't the airplanes. It was Beauty killed the Beast," before walking away.

== Cast ==
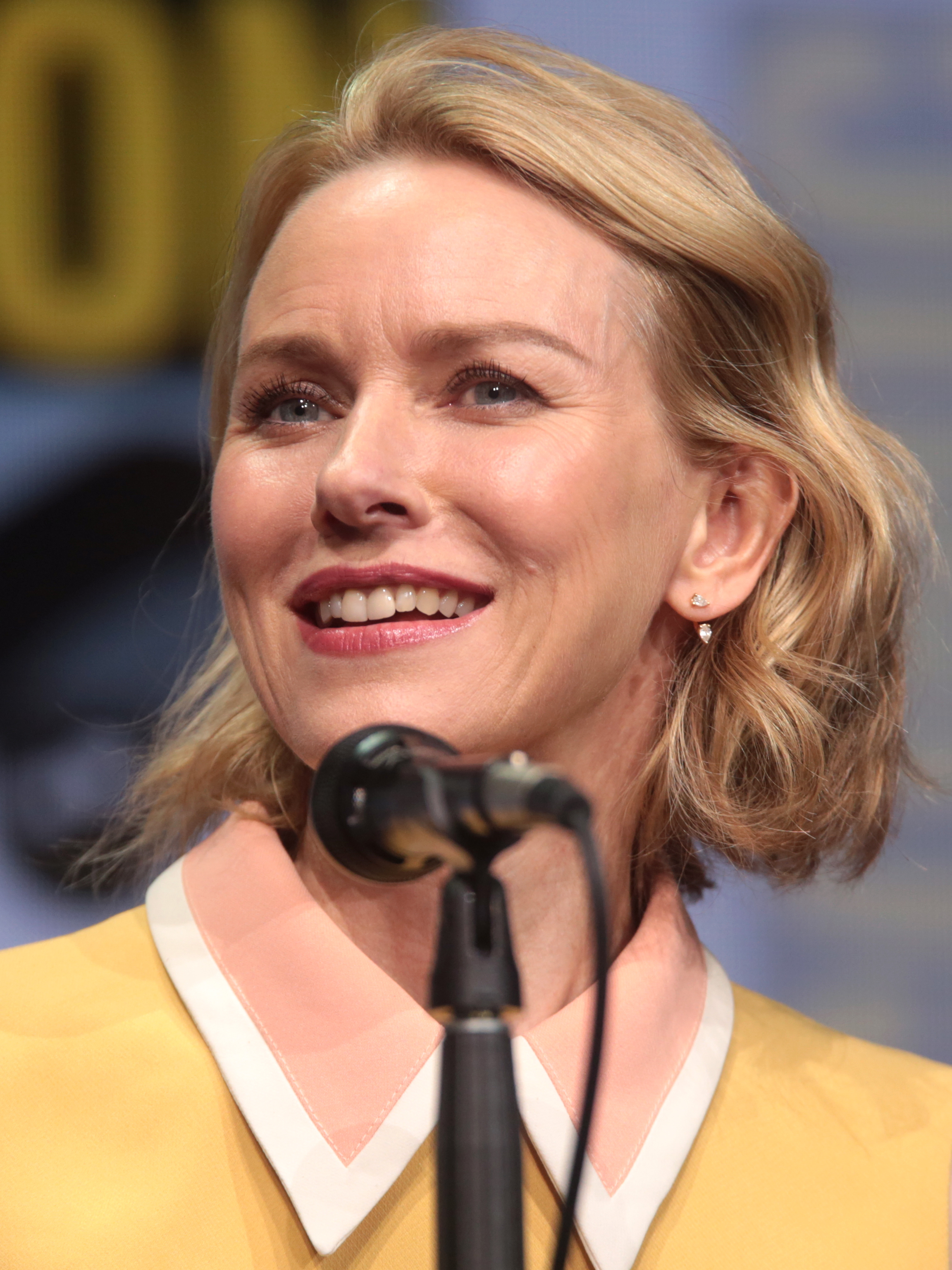
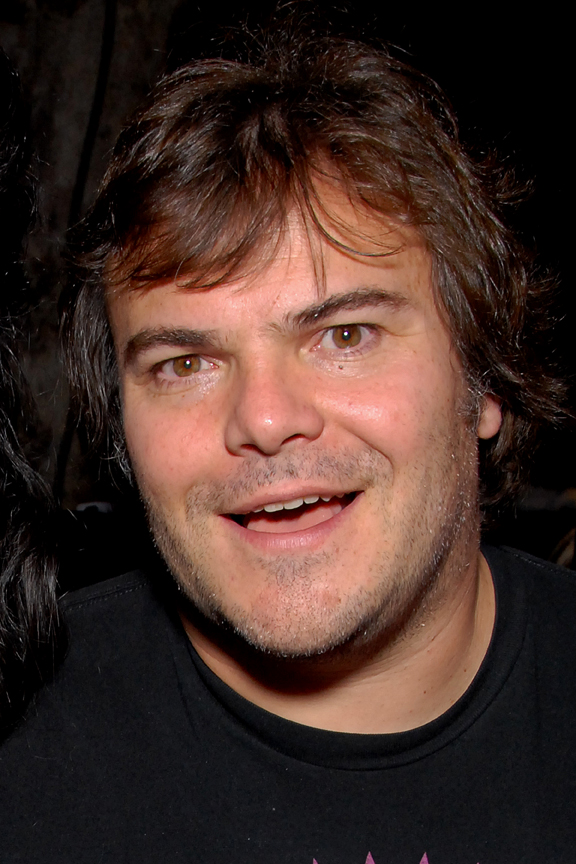
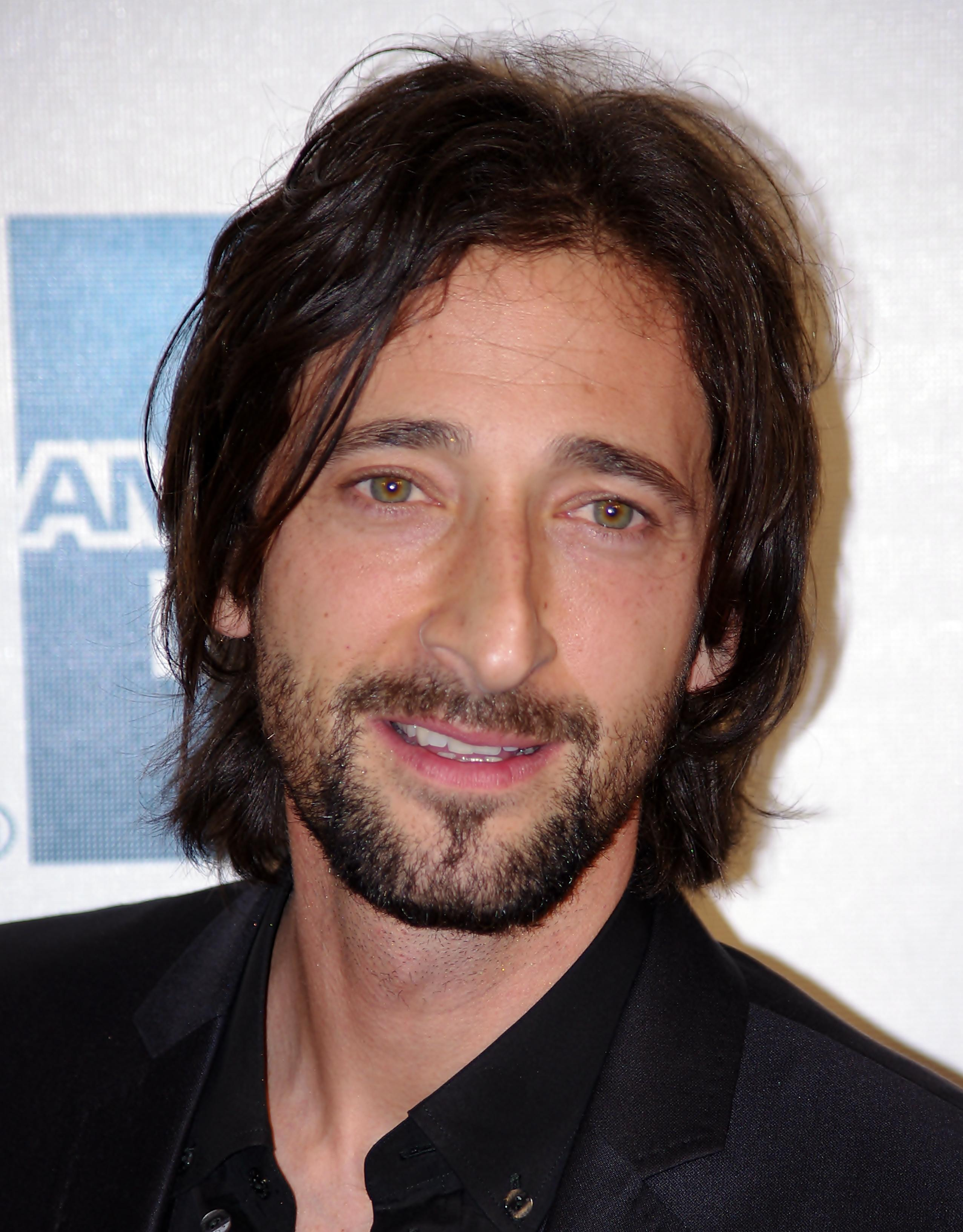
Top to bottom: Naomi Watts, Jack Black, and Adrien Brody star in the film as Ann Darrow, Carl Denham and Jack Driscoll respectively.
- Naomi Watts as Ann Darrow, a struggling vaudeville actress who is desperate for work. Carl first meets her when she tries to steal an apple from a fruit stand. Further into the voyage, she falls in love with Jack and forms a special relationship with Kong.
- Jack Black as Carl Denham, a film director who obtained the map to Skull Island. Due to his debts, Carl starts to lose his moral compass and obsesses over his film to the point that he disregards safety.
- Adrien Brody as Jack Driscoll, a screenwriter who falls in love with Ann. He unwittingly becomes part of the voyage when, while delivering a script to Denham, he is deliberately delayed by the latter before he can get off the Venture. He is the only member of the crew who agrees with Ann that Kong should be left alone.
- Thomas Kretschmann as Captain Englehorn, the German captain of the Venture. Englehorn shows a dislike for Denham, presumably because of his obsessive nature.
- Colin Hanks as Preston, Denham's neurotic but honest personal assistant.
- Jamie Bell as Jimmy, a naive teenager who was found on the Venture, wild and abandoned.
- Evan Parke as Benjamin "Ben" Hayes, Englehorn's first mate and a mentor to Jimmy, who leads Ann's rescue mission because of his army training and combat experience gained during World War I.
- Lobo Chan as Choy, Lumpy's best friend and a janitor on the Venture.
- Kyle Chandler as Bruce Baxter, an actor who specializes in adventure films. He abandons Ann's rescue mission but brings Englehorn to rescue the search party from the insect pit, and is given credit for rescuing Ann during the Broadway display of Kong.
- Andy Serkis as Kong (motion capture), a 25-foot (7.6 m) tall prehistoric ape resembling that of a silverback lowland gorilla who is around 100–150 years old. He is the last of his species, Megaprimatus kong.
  - Serkis also plays Lumpy, the ship's cook, barber, and surgeon. A brave sailor, he warns Denham about rumors he has heard about Skull Island and Kong.
- John Sumner as Herb, Denham's loyal cameraman.
- Craig Hall as Mike, Denham's soundman for the journey.
- William Johnson as Manny, an elderly vaudevillian actor and colleague of Ann.
- Mark Hadlow as Harry, a struggling vaudevillian actor.
- Jed Brophy and Todd Rippon appeared in the film as crew members.

In addition, director Jackson appears with makeup artist Rick Baker (who had portrayed Kong and designed makeup for the 1976 version) as the pilot and gunner on the airplane that kills the title character, his children appear as New York children, The Lord of the Rings co-producer and second unit director Rick Porras and The Shawshank Redemption director Frank Darabont appear as a gunners in the other airplanes, and Bob Burns and his wife appear as New York bystanders. Frequent Jackson collaborator Howard Shore makes a cameo appearance as the conductor of the New York theater from where Kong escapes. Shore was initially set to compose for the film before his exit.

Watts, Black, and Brody were the first choices for their respective roles with no other actors considered. In preparation for her role, Watts met with the original Ann Darrow, Fay Wray. Jackson wanted Wray to make a cameo appearance and say the final line of dialogue, but she died during pre-production at 96 years old. Black was cast as Carl Denham based on his performance in the 2000 film High Fidelity, which had impressed Jackson. For inspiration, Black studied P. T. Barnum and Orson Welles. "I didn't study [Welles] move for move. It was just to capture the spirit. Very reckless guy. I had tapes of him drunk off his ass." The native extras on Skull Island were portrayed by a mix of Asian, African, Maori and Polynesian actors sprayed with dark makeup to achieve a consistent pigmentation.

== Production ==
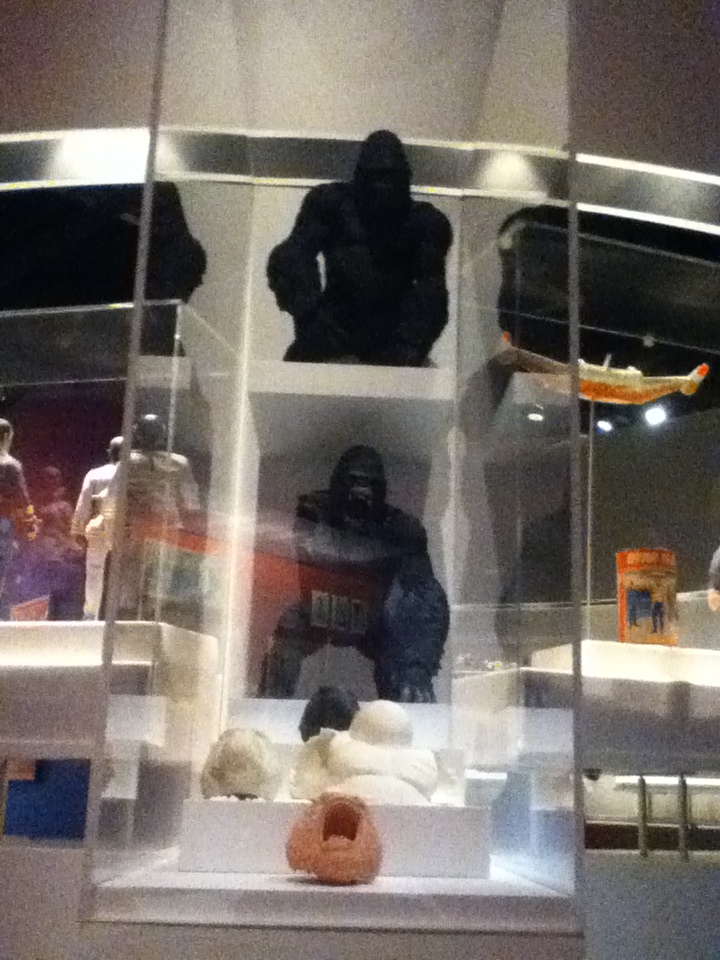
Model used in the production of the 2005 adaption of the King Kong series

=== Development ===
==== Earlier attempts and 1990s ====
Peter Jackson was nine years old when he first saw the 1933 film, and was in tears in front of the television when Kong was shot and fell off the Empire State Building. At age 12, he attempted to recreate the film using his parents' Super 8 mm film camera and a model of Kong made of wire and rubber with his mother's fur coat for the hair, but eventually gave up on the project. King Kong eventually became his favorite film and was the primary inspiration for his decision to become a filmmaker as a teenager. He read books about the making of King Kong and collected memorabilia, as well as articles from Famous Monsters of Filmland. Jackson paid tribute to the 1933 film by including Skull Island as the origin of the zombie plague in his 1992 film Braindead.

During the filming of Jackson's 1996 film The Frighteners, Universal Pictures was impressed with Jackson's dailies and early visual effects footage. The studio was adamant to work with Jackson on his next project and, in late 1995, offered him the chance to direct a remake of the 1954 film Creature from the Black Lagoon. He turned down the offer, but Universal became aware of Jackson's obsession with King Kong and subsequently offered him the opportunity to direct that remake. The studio did not have to worry about lawsuits concerning the film rights from RKO Pictures (the studio behind the 1933 film) because the King Kong character is held in the public domain. Jackson initially turned down the King Kong offer, but he "quickly became disturbed by the fact that someone else would take it over," Jackson continued, "and make it into a terrible film; that haunted me and I eventually said yes to Universal."

At the same time, Jackson was working with Harvey Weinstein and Miramax Films to purchase the film rights of The Hobbit and The Lord of the Rings, while 20th Century Fox was trying to hire him for the 2001 remake of Planet of the Apes. Jackson turned down Planet of the Apes and because Weinstein was taking longer than expected to buy The Lord of the Rings rights, Jackson decided to move forward on King Kong. Weinstein was furious, and, as a result, Jackson proposed a deal between Universal and Miramax Films that the two studios would equally finance King Kong with Jackson's production company WingNut Films. Universal would receive distribution rights in the United States, while Miramax Films would cover foreign territories. Jackson was also warranted the right of final cut privilege, a percentage of the gross profits, as well as artistic control; Universal allowed all filming and visual effects to be handled entirely in New Zealand. The deal was settled in April 1996, and Jackson, along with wife Fran Walsh, began working on the King Kong script. In the original draft, Ann was the daughter of famed English archaeologist Lord Linwood Darrow exploring ancient ruins in Sumatra. They would come into conflict with Denham during his filming, and they would uncover a hidden Kong statue and the map of Skull Island. This would indicate that the island natives were the last remnants of a cult religion that had once thrived on Asia's mainland. Instead of a playwright, Jack was the first mate and an ex-World War I fighter pilot still struggling with the loss of his best friend, who had been killed in battle during a World War I prologue. The camera-man Herb is the only supporting character in the original draft who made it to the final version. The fight between Kong and the three V. rex also changed from the original draft. In the draft, Ann is actually caught in the V. rex's jaws, where she becomes wedged, and slashed by the teeth; after the fight, Kong gets her out but she is suffering from a fever, from which she then recovers.

Universal approved of the script with Robert Zemeckis as executive producer, and pre-production for King Kong commenced. The plan was to begin filming sometime in 1997 for a summer 1998 release date. Weta Digital and Weta Workshop, under the supervision of Richard Taylor and Christian Rivers, began work on early visual effects tests, specifically the complex task of building a CGI version of New York City circa 1933. Jackson and Walsh progressed with a second draft script, sets were being designed and location scouting commenced in Sumatra and New Zealand. In late 1996, Jackson flew to production of the 1997 film Titanic in Mexico to discuss the part of Ann Darrow with Kate Winslet, with whom he previously worked with on his 1994 film Heavenly Creatures. Minnie Driver was also being reportedly considered. Jackson's choices for Jack Driscoll and Carl Denham included George Clooney and Robert De Niro. However, development for King Kong was stalled in January 1997 when Universal became concerned over the upcoming release of the 1998 film Godzilla, as well as other ape-related remakes with the 1998 film Mighty Joe Young and the 2001 film Planet of the Apes. Universal abandoned King Kong in February 1997 after Weta Workshop and Weta Digital had already designed six months' worth of pre-production. Jackson then decided to start work on The Lord of the Rings film series.

==== Revival of the project ====
With the financial and critical success of the 2001 film The Fellowship of the Ring and the 2002 film The Two Towers, Universal approached Jackson in early 2003, during the post-production of The Return of the King, concerning his interest in restarting development on King Kong. In March 2003, Universal set a target December 2005 release date and Jackson and Walsh brought The Lord of the Rings co-writer Philippa Boyens on to help rewrite their 1996 script. Jackson offered New Line Cinema the opportunity to co-finance with Universal, but they declined. Universal and Jackson originally projected a $150 million budget, which eventually rose to $175 million. Jackson made a deal with Universal whereby he would be paid a $20 million salary against 20% of the box office gross for directing, producing and co-writing. He shared that fee with co-writers Walsh (which also covered her producing credit) and Boyens. However, if King Kong were to go over its $175 million budget, the penalties would be covered by Jackson.

Immediately after the completion of The Return of the King, Weta Workshop and Weta Digital, supervised by Taylor, Rivers, and Joe Letteri, started pre-production on King Kong. Jackson brought back most of the crew he had on The Lord of the Rings series, including cinematographer Andrew Lesnie, production designer Grant Major, art directors Simon Bright and Dan Hennah, conceptual designer Alan Lee, and editor Jamie Selkirk. Jackson, Walsh and Boyens began to write a new script in late October 2003. Jackson acknowledged that he was highly unsatisfied with the original 1996 script. "That was actually just Fran and Peter very hurriedly getting something down on paper", Boyens explained. "It was more one of many possible ways the story could go." The writers chose to base the new screenplay on the 1933 film rather than the 1996 script. They also included scenes from James Ashmore Creelman's screenplay that were either abandoned or omitted during production of the original film. In the scene where Kong shakes the surviving sailors pursuing Ann and himself from a log into the ravine, for example, directors Merian Cooper and Ernest B. Schoedsack originally intended to depict giant spiders emerging from the rock to devour their bodies. This was cut from the original release print, and remains known to Kong fans only via a rare still that appeared in Famous Monsters of Filmland. Jackson included this scene and elaborated upon it. Jackson, Walsh and Boyens also cited Delos W. Lovelace's 1932 novelisation of King Kong as inspiration, which included the character Lumpy (Andy Serkis). To make the relationship between Ann Darrow and Kong plausible, the writers studied hours of gorilla footage. Jackson also optioned Early Havoc, a memoir written by vaudeville performer June Havoc to help Walsh and Boyens flesh out Ann Darrow's characterisation. Carl Denham was intentionally modeled after and inspired by Orson Welles. Their new draft was finished in February 2004.

=== Filming ===
Principal photography started on 6 September 2004, at Camperdown Studios in Miramar, New Zealand. Camperdown housed the native village and the Great Wall, while the streets of New York City were constructed on its backlot and at Gracefield in Lower Hutt, New Zealand. The majority of the SS Venture scenes were shot aboard a full-scale deck constructed in the parking lot at Camperdown Studio and then were backed with a green screen, with the ocean digitally added in post. Scenes set in the Broadway theater from which King Kong makes his escape were filmed in Wellington's Opera House and at the Auckland Civic Theatre. Filming also took place at Stone Street Studios, where a new sound stage was constructed to accommodate one of the sets. Over the course of filming the budget went from $175 million to $207 million over additional visual effects work needed, and Jackson extending the film's running time by thirty minutes. Jackson covered most of the $32 million surplus himself and finished filming in March 2005.

The film's budget climbed from an initial US$150 million to a then-record-breaking $207 million and received a subsidy of $34 million from New Zealand, making it at one point the most expensive film yet made. Universal only agreed to such an outlay after seeing a screening of the unfinished film, to which executives responded enthusiastically. Marketing and promotion costs were an estimated $60 million. The runtime was originally set to be 135 minutes but soon grew to 200. The additional length was approved after Universal executives flew to New Zealand to view a rough cut.

Other difficulties included Peter Jackson's decision to change composers from Howard Shore to James Newton Howard seven weeks before the film opened.

=== Visual effects ===
Andy Serkis in his Kong bodysuit

Jackson saw King Kong as opportunity for technical innovations in motion capture, commissioning Christian Rivers of Weta Digital to supervise all aspects of Kong's performance. Jackson decided early on that he did not want Kong to behave like a human, and so he and his team studied hours of gorilla footage. Serkis was cast in the title role in April 2003 and prepared himself by working with gorillas at the London Zoo. He then traveled to Rwanda, observing the actions and behaviors of gorillas in the wild. Rivers explained that the detailed facial performance capture with Serkis was accomplished because of the similarities between human and gorilla faces. "Gorillas have such a similar looking set of eyes and brows, you can look at those expressions and transpose your own interpretation onto them." Photos of silverback gorillas were also superimposed on Kong's image in the early stages of animation. Serkis had to go through two hours of motion capture makeup every day, having 135 small markers attached to different spots on his face. Following principal photography, Serkis had to spend an additional two months on a motion capture stage, miming Kong's movements for the film's digital animators.

Apart from Kong, Skull Island is inhabited by dinosaurs and other large fauna. Inspired by Dougal Dixon's works, the designers imagined what 65 million years or more of isolated evolution might have done to dinosaurs and the other creatures.

== Music ==
The original score was initially set to be composed by Howard Shore, who had written several cues for the film. Due to creative differences with Jackson, Shore opted out of the project in October 2005 and subsequently James Newton Howard replaced him. With scoring beginning by late-October 2005, Howard had only five weeks to work on the film, as a result, he found the film "hardest to compose". Recording sessions took place at the Sony Scoring Stage, California and Todd-AO, Los Angeles, consisting of 108-piece orchestra and 40-member choir, and a varied range of instruments used.

The film's soundtrack includes Al Jolson's recording of "I'm Sitting on Top of the World", Peggy Lee's "Bye Bye Blackbird", and some themes from Max Steiner's soundtrack for the original 1933 film. The score was released on 7 December 2005, by Decca Records to positive response. Howard's score was later nominated for the Golden Globe Award for Best Original Score.

== Cinematic and literary allusions ==
- Jack Black and critics have noted Carl Denham's similarity to Orson Welles.
- When Driscoll is searching for a place to sleep in the animal storage hold, a box behind him reads Sumatran Rat Monkey – Beware the bite!, which is a reference to the creature that causes mayhem in Jackson's 1992 film Braindead.
- Jimmy reads part of Joseph Conrad's Heart of Darkness while en route to Skull Island, at one point comparing their journey to that of the novella.

=== References to original 1933 King Kong ===
- Fay Wray, the original Ann Darrow, was asked by Jackson to appear in a cameo role in which she would utter the film's final line: "It was beauty killed the beast." At first, she flatly refused, but then seemed to consider the possibility. However, she died shortly after her meeting with Jackson. As in the original film, the line ultimately went to the character of Carl Denham.
- An ad for Universal is visible while Kong is tearing up Times Square. In the 1933 film, an ad for Columbia Pictures appeared in the same spot, and the production designers replicated it, but Columbia asked for a large amount of money for its use, so effects artists replaced it.
- Before meeting Ann, when Denham is searching for a candidate to play the part in his show, he suggests "Fay", but his assistant Preston replies, "She's doing a picture with RKO." Music from the 1933 film is heard, and Denham mutters, "Cooper, huh? I might have known." Fay Wray starred in the 1933 film, which was directed by Merian C. Cooper and released by RKO. At the time she was performing in another Cooper/Schoedsack production, The Most Dangerous Game with Robert Armstrong.
- In the 1933 film, Denham made up an "Arabian proverb" about "beauty and beast". The 2005 remake repeats the fake proverb.
- Early in this film, Denham shoots a scene for his film in which Ann, in-character, proclaims she has never been on a ship before, and Bruce Baxter improvises lines proclaiming annoyance. The dialogue they exchange is taken verbatim from early scenes between Ann and Jack Driscoll in the 1933 film. In this film, Jack Driscoll expresses disapproval of such words toward Ann.
- Kong's New York stage appearance looks very much like a re-enactment of the 1933 film's sacrifice scene, including the posts the 'beauty' is tied to and the nearly identical performance, costumes, and blackface makeup of the dancers. In addition, the music played by the orchestra during that scene is Max Steiner's original score for the 1933 film.
- The battle between Kong and the final V. rex is almost move-for-move like the last half of the fight between Kong and the T. rex in the 1933 film, right down to Kong playing with the dinosaur's broken jaw and then standing, beating his chest and roaring victoriously.
- After the crew captures Kong on the beach, Denham speaks a line from the 1933 film: "The whole world will pay to see this! We're millionaires, boys! I'll share it with all of you. In a few months, his name will be up in lights on Broadway! Kong, the Eighth Wonder of the World!"

== Release ==
=== Marketing ===
The official marketing campaign commenced on 27 June 2005, with the online release of the teaser trailer first at the Volkswagen website at 8:45 p.m. EDT, then at 8:55 p.m. EDT across media outlets owned by NBCUniversal (the parent of Universal Studios), including NBC, Bravo, CNBC, and MSNBC. That trailer subsequently appeared in theaters attached to War of the Worlds, which opened on June 29.

Jackson also published a series of 'Production Diaries', which chronicled the film's production. The diaries started shortly after the DVD release of The Return of the King as a way to give Jackson's The Lord of the Rings fans a glimpse of his next project. These diaries are edited into broadband-friendly installments of three or four minutes each. They consist of features that would normally be seen in a making-of documentary: a tour of the set, a roving camera introducing key players behind the scene, a peek inside the sound booth during last-minute dubbing, or Andy Serkis doing his ape movements in a motion capture studio.

The release was followed by a novelisation of the film and a prequel novel entitled King Kong: The Island of the Skull, as well as a multi-platform video game, Peter Jackson's King Kong. Weta Workshop also released The World of Kong: A Natural History of Skull Island, a hardback book featuring artwork describing the film's fictional wildlife.

Jackson has expressed his desire to remaster the film in 3D at some point in the future. Jackson was also seen shooting with a 3-D camera at times during the shoot of King Kong.

=== Box office ===
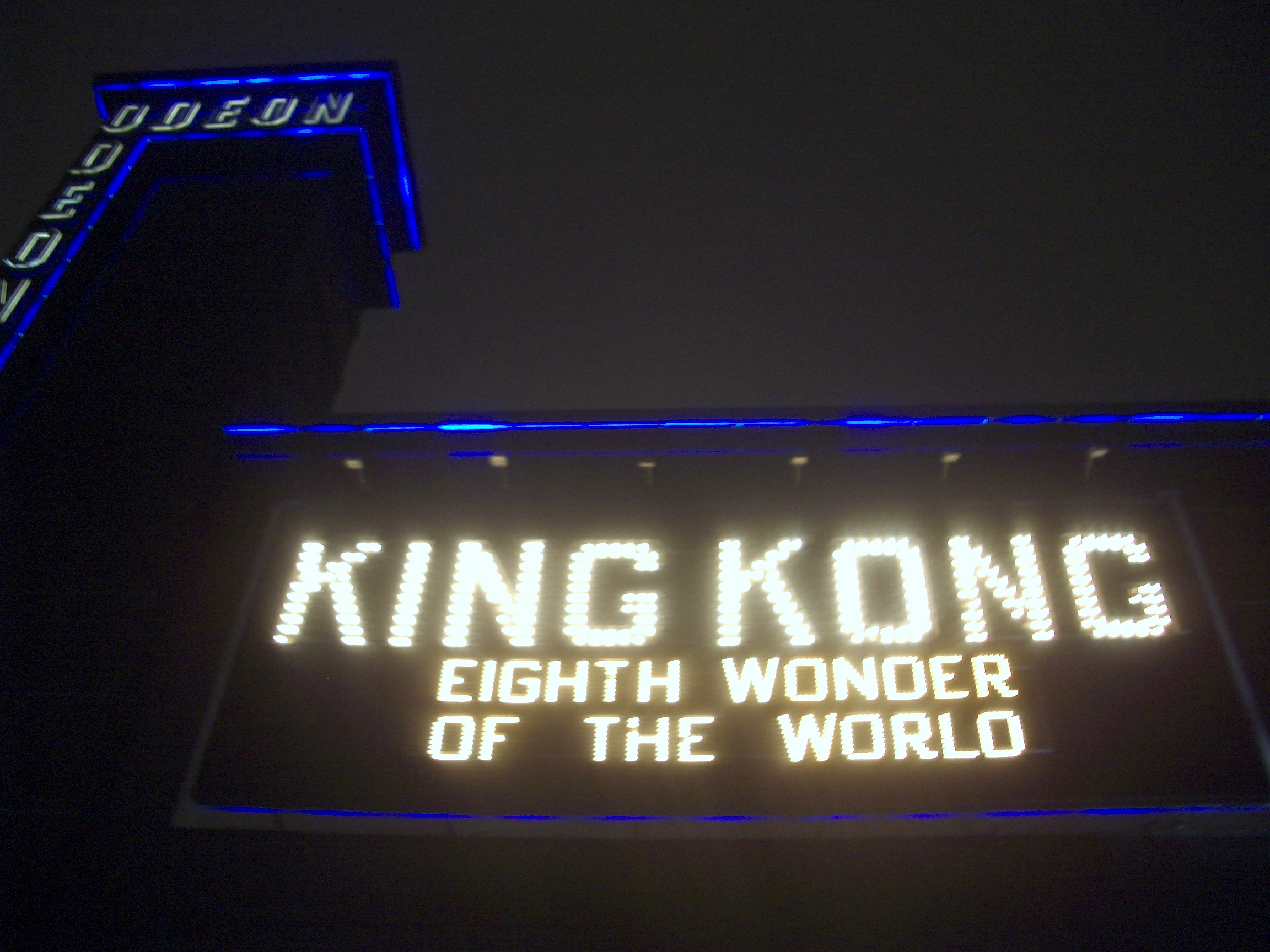
The billboard at the Odeon Leicester Square premiere

In North America, King Kong grossed $9.8 million during its Wednesday opening and $50.1 million over its first weekend for a five-day total of $66.2 million from around 7,500 screens at 3,568 theaters. Some analysts considered these initial numbers disappointing, saying that studio executives had been expecting more. The film went on to gross $218.1 million in the North American market and ended up in the top five highest-grossing films of the year there. The film grossed an additional $338.8 million at the box office in other regions for a worldwide total of $556.9 million, which also ranked it in the top five highest-grossing films of 2005 worldwide.

During its home video release, King Kong sold over $100 million worth of DVDs in the largest six-day performance in Universal Studios history. King Kong sold more than 7.6 million DVDs, accumulating nearly $194 million worth of sales numbers in the North American market alone. As of 25 June 2006, King Kong has generated almost $38 million from DVD rental gross. In February 2006, Turner Broadcasting System (TNT/TBS) and ABC paid Universal Pictures $26.5 million for the television rights to the film.

== Reception ==
=== Critical response ===
King Kong received acclaim from critics. On aggregate review site Rotten Tomatoes, the film has an approval rating of 84% based on 267 reviews, with an average rating of 8.0/10. The site's critical consensus reads, "Featuring state-of-the-art special effects, terrific performances, and a majestic sense of spectacle, Peter Jackson's remake of King Kong is a potent epic that's faithful to the spirit of the 1933 original." On Metacritic, the film has a score of 81 out of 100, based on 39 critics, indicating "universal acclaim". Audiences polled by CinemaScore gave the film an average grade of "A−" on an A+ to F scale.

It was placed on the 'top ten' lists of several critics, with Roger Ebert giving it four stars, and listed it as 2005's eighth-best film. The film received four Academy Award nominations, for Visual Effects, Sound Mixing (Christopher Boyes, Michael Semanick, Michael Hedges, Hammond Peek), Sound Editing, and Production Design, winning all but the last. Entertainment Weekly called the depiction of Kong the most convincing computer-generated character in film in 2005. Some criticised the film for retaining racist stereotypes that had been present in the 1933 film, though it was not suggested that Jackson had done this intentionally. King Kong ranks 450th on Empire magazine's 2008 list of the 500 Greatest Movies of All Time. The Guardian reviewer Peter Bradshaw said that it "certainly equals, and even exceeds, anything Jackson did in Lord of the Rings." However, Charlie Brooker, also of The Guardian, gave a negative review in which he describes the film as "sixteen times more overblown and histrionic than necessary".

=== Accolades ===
The film garnered nominations in various categories, particularly for Jackson's direction, Best Visual Effects, Best Art Direction, as well as lead performance of Watts. It earned three Academy Awards for Best Sound Editing, Best Sound Mixing and Best Visual Effects.

== Other releases ==
=== Home media ===
King Kong was released on DVD on 28 March 2006, in the United States and Canada by Universal Studios Home Entertainment, such versions as a single-disc widescreen and a two-disc 'Widescreen Special Edition'.

A three-disc Deluxe Extended Edition was released on 14 November 2006, in the United States, and on November 3 in Australia. Twelve minutes were re-inserted into the film, and an additional forty minutes included with the rest of the special features. The film was spread onto the first two discs with commentary by Peter Jackson and Philippa Boyens, and some featurettes on discs one and two, whilst the main special features are on disc three. Another set was released, including a WETA figurine of a bullet-ridden Kong scaling the Empire State Building, roaring at the Navy with Ann in hand. The extended film amounts to 200 total minutes.

A special HD DVD version of King Kong was part of a promotional pack for the release of the external HD DVD Drive for the Xbox 360. The pack contained the HD DVD drive, the Universal Media Remote and King Kong on HD DVD. It was also available separately as a standard HD DVD. The film's theatrical and extended cuts were released together on Blu-ray Disc on 20 January 2009. A re-release of the Blu-Ray with a new bonus disc containing nearly all of the extras from the 2-disc Special Edition DVD, the Deluxe Extended Edition 3-disc DVD, and the "Peter Jackson's Production Diaries" 2-disc DVD titled the "Ultimate Edition" was released on 7 February 2017. An Ultra HD Blu-ray followed in July 2017.

=== Theme park ===
The Universal Orlando Resort location Islands of Adventure features an attraction called "Skull Island: Reign of Kong" which is based on Peter Jackson's remake. While the King Kong part of the Universal Studios Hollywood resort was destroyed by a massive fire, a 3D short inspired by the film was eventually created in 2010, King Kong: 360 3-D, which is another attraction based on Peter Jackson's remake.

== Cancelled sequel and reboot ==
In March 2021, Adam Wingard said in an interview that back in 2013, Jackson had been interested in producing a sequel to the film, titled Skull Island, with Wingard as director and Simon Barrett writing it. Jackson had been impressed with Wingard's work in You're Next, and investigated a potential sequel. However, the rights had already been transferred to Warner Bros. by 2013, which complicated a sequel to a Universal-produced movie. Wingard says that Jackson was thinking of setting the proposed movie during World War I, which would make it a prequel, but that the studio was uninterested in a World War I era film. Wingard pivoted to offering a modern-day sequel, but ultimately nothing came of the proposal. Wingard would eventually direct the King Kong films Godzilla vs. Kong (2021) and Godzilla x Kong: The New Empire (2024).

Ultimately, Warner Bros. rebooted the franchise with Kong: Skull Island in 2017, which is part of the Monsterverse.

== See also ==
- Mighty Joe Young
- List of films featuring dinosaurs
- List of most expensive films
