= Achille Talon =

Belgian comic strip (1963–2017)

- Cover of L'Archipel de Sanzunron (The Notapenny Archipelago)
- Author: Greg
- Current status/schedule: Discontinued
- Launch date: 1963
- End date: 2017
- Publisher: Le Lombard
- Genre(s): Humor, satire

Achille Talon is a Franco-Belgian comics series featuring an eponymous main character, created by Greg (the pseudonym of Michel Regnier). Starting publication in the Franco-Belgian comics magazine Pilote in 1963, the series presents the comic misadventures of an anti-hero.

The name derives from "talon d'Achille", the French term for an "Achilles' heel".

== Publication history ==
The first Achille Talon gag was published in Pilote on November 7, 1963. After several years of gags and increasing popularity, Achille Talon got a dedicated magazine of its own, Achille Talon magazine, starting publication on October 1, 1975. Not achieving the intended success, the magazine ceased publication after one year, producing only six issues. The album series has produced 46 volumes. Achille Talon is presented in two quite different formats: there are album length stories such as Achille Talon et la main du serpent (Achille Talon and the Serpent's Hand), a 44-page story, as well as albums with only gags that run one or two pages each. Regardless of format, Achille Talon would typically first appear a few pages at a time in the weekly magazine Pilote, then be collected later for hardcover or softcover books.

== Characters ==
Achille Talon is a bourgeois who likes to think he's an eloquent (others say voluble) intellectual. He is vain to the extent that he builds a giant statue of himself in his front garden and desperately tries to get on the good side of the local gentry. That being said, Achille Talon is a gentleman, an intrepid traveler and an animal lover. He values etiquette and sometimes resorts to activism (e.g., pro peace or against pollution) or inventions. He is often at odds with his neighbour Hilarion Lefuneste, who loves to argue too. (In French, le funeste means "the grievous/fateful one" suggesting any dealings with him will have negative consequences.)

A man in his forties, Achille is single and lives at home with his parents. His father, Alambic Dieudonné Corydon Talon, is a beer-fanatic, while his mother, unnamed but always "maman", is a strong, earthy, loving bourgeois housewife. He never tires of the attentions of the aristocratic Virgule de Guillemets, who brings sophistication to his life.

Achille Talon is courageous and magnanimous, protector of animals, and a vigilant guardian of etiquette. He patronizes arts (as long as he is the one portrayed) and is a wise, though ostensibly tyrannical, head of state.

== Device ==
On a page verbal and visual humor are usually mixed, although sometimes the humour is strictly visual, sometimes mostly verbal. The visual humor is often from exaggeration (phones often do not simply ring, but explode), however occasionally it is subtle and understated (a factory spewing out toxic fumes, bearing a sign "Gourmet Foods", or a funnel in the soil of an overflowing pot, where watering with any tool could hardly miss).

The verbal humour usually consists of long rants, in which internal inconsistencies, puns and sheer nonsense are cleverly interspersed. Of course, Achille Talon is almost invariably proven wrong and ends up being the butt of the joke.

== Typical quotes ==
- "Bof" or "Hop" are his favorite interjections, especially if things do not turn out as expected. "Bof!" is the verbal equivalent of the Gaulish shrug, rather like "Whatever!"
- "After careful consideration of the facts, I've decided to faint. It may not be very heroic, but it is relaxing. Therefore, zzzzz."

== Translation into English ==
In 1981, Dargaud Canada translated Le Trésor de Virgule into English as Magnesia's Treasure. Achille Talon was translated into Walter Melon, presumably a pun on "watermelon". The paperback volume included two features not included in the French original: a page introducing the characters (similar to the opening of Asterix books), and a humorous three page illustrated essay on Greg and the publishing industry in general. The back cover is the familiar picture of Talon leaning out of a newsstand snagging Lefuneste, with a small inset with a photograph of Greg titled "AUTHOR AND GENIUS", followed by a quote "SUCCESS DID NOT SPOIL ME. I WAS BORN SPOILED."

== Television adaptation ==
A television series of fifty-two twenty-six-minute episodes was made for Canal+ in 1996 by Saban International Paris. Each episode is broken up into two short stories. It was broadcast in France for the first time on September 3, 1997, in the television show C + Cléo on Canal+.

The animated series is very different from the original comic. In the animated cartoon, Talon is a very awkward superhero who offers his heroic services for hire, replacing such characters as Luke Skywalker, Zorro and Tarzan when they become indisposed. Talon manages to make justice triumph by pure luck. The series was renamed Walter Melon for English-speaking television. The English version was broadcast on the Fox Family Channel.

== Albums ==
- Achille Talon cerveau choc (1966)
- Achille Talon aggrave son cas (1967)
- Achille Talon persiste et signe (1969)
- Mon fils à moi (1970)
- L'Indispensable Achille Talon (1971)
- Achille Talon au pouvoir (1972)
- Les Insolences d'Achille Talon (1973)
- Achille Talon méprise l'obstacle (1973)
- Les Petits Desseins d'Achille Talon (1974)
- Le Roi de la science diction (1974)
- Brave et honnête Achille Talon (1975)
- Achille Talon au coin du feu (1975)
- Pas de pitié pour Achille Talon (1976)
- Le Mystère de l'homme à deux têtes (1976)
- Le Quadrumane optimiste (1976)
- Le Trésor de Virgule (1977)
- Le Roi des Zôtres (1977)
- Coquin de sort (1978)
- Le Grain de la folie (1978)
- Viva papa (1978)
- Ma vie à moi (1978)
- Le Sort s'acharne sur Achille Talon (1979)
- Achille Talon et la main du serpent (1980)
- L'Âge ingrat (1980)
- L'Esprit d'Eloi (1980)
- L'Arme du crocodile (1981)
- Ne rêvons pas (1981)
- L'insubmersible Achille Talon (1981)
- La Loi du bidouble (1982)
- Achille Talon a un gros nez (1982)
- Il n'y a (Dieu merci) qu'un seul Achille Talon (1982)
- La Traversée du disert (1982)
- La Vie secrète du journal Polite (1983)
- L'Incorrigible Achille Talon (1983)
- Achille Talon à bout portant (1984)
- Achille Talon n'a pas tout dit (1985)
- L'Archipel de Sanzunron (1987)
- Achille Talon contre docteur Chacal et mister Bide! (1989)
- Talon (Achille) pour les dames (1989)
- Achille Talon et le monstre de l'étang Tacule (1991)
- L'Appeau d'Ephèse (1996)
- Le Musée Achille Talon (1996)
- Le Maître est Talon (2001)

=== Post-Greg era ===
- Achille Talon a la main verte (1998) (Widenlocher and Godard)
- Tout va bien! (2000) (Widenlocher and Brett)
- Le Monde merveilleux du journal Polite (2004) (Widenlocher and Herlé)

== See also ==
• Marcinelle school • Belgian comics • Franco-Belgian comics

== Sources ==
- Achille Talon publications in Pilote and French Tintin Archived 2007-09-30 at the Wayback Machine BDoubliées (in French)
- Achille Talon on Bedetheque.com
- Achille Talon on Dargaud.com
- Biography of Greg(in French)
