= Evan Parke =

Jamaican-American actor

- Born: Kingston, Jamaica
- Education: Cornell University
- Occupation: Actor

Evan Dexter O'Neal Parke is a Jamaican-American actor. He is best known for his role as Hayes in King Kong.

== Early life, family and education ==
Originally from Kingston, Jamaica, he was raised in Brooklyn, New York City, New York, and then on Long Island, New York.

He was an economics major at Cornell University. He later earned a masters degree from Yale School of Drama. In 1997, Parke attended the New York Film Academy, focusing on film producing. This was funded with a William & Eva Fox Foundation Fellowship.

== Career ==
His onscreen performances began on television with a role on the soap opera All My Children but also he performed in movies such as The Cider House Rules. Since 2014 his focus has been television.

Parke's stage performances include Colored People's Time, The Old Settler and The Lion King on Broadway.

He played Hayes in King Kong. In 2018 he was cast in the unsold pilot Salvage.

== Filmography ==
- The Cider House Rules (1999) - Jack
- The Replacements (2000) - Malcolm La Mont
- Planet of the Apes (2001) - Gunnar
- Nightstalker (2002) - Lieutenant Mayberry
- Kiss Kiss, Bang Bang (2005) - Dexter Clinic Guard
- Fellowship (2005) - Second Homeless Man
- King Kong (2005) - Benjamin "Ben" Hayes
- The Air I Breathe (2007) - Danny
- Insanitarium (2008) - Charles
- All Roads Lead Home (2008) - Basham
- Django Unchained (2012) - Baghead
- Captain America: The Winter Soldier (2014) - S.H.I.E.L.D Agent

== Television ==
- All My Children (1997–1998) - Rafe
- As the World Turns (1999) - Judge Blanchard
- Alias (2001–2002) - Charlie
- Brother's Keeper (2002) - Junior
- Second String (2002) - Mumms
- L.A. Dragnet (2003–2004) - Detective Raymond Cooper
- Charmed (2005) - Kahn
- E-Ring (2005) Kamal
- Law & Order: Criminal Intent (2006) - Gorro
- Without a Trace (2007) - Frank Cole
- Desperate Housewives (2010) - Derek Yeager
- The Young and the Restless (2010–2012) - District Attorney, Spencer Walsh
- Blue Bloods (2017) - Duwan Brown
- The Blacklist (2018) - Detective Norman Singleton
- Tell me a Story (2019) - Ken Morris
- Star Trek: Picard (2020) - Tenqem Adrev
- The First Lady (2022) - Allen Taylor
- Good Sam (2022) - Byron Kingsley

== Video games ==
- Peter Jackson's King Kong (2005) - Benjamin "Ben" Hayes
- Detroit: Become Human (2018) - Luther
