= Carl Denham =

Fictional character in King Kong franchise

- King Kong character
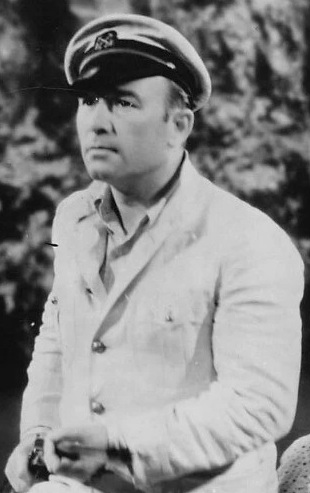
- Denham, as portrayed by Robert Armstrong in Son of Kong (1933)
- First appearance: King Kong (1933)
- Last appearance: King Kong (2005)
- Created by: Edgar Wallace; Merian C. Cooper
- Portrayed by: Robert Armstrong (1933); Jack Black (2005)
- Voiced by: Dudley Moore (1998)

In-universe information
- Occupation: Film director (formerly); Merchant
- Nationality: American

Carl Denham is a fictional character in the films King Kong and The Son of Kong (both released in 1933), as well as in the 2005 remake of King Kong, and a 2004 illustrated novel titled Kong: King of Skull Island. The role was played by Robert Armstrong in the 1933 films and by Jack Black in the 2005 remake. In The Mighty Kong, he was voiced by Dudley Moore. Denham's function in the story is to initiate the action by bringing the characters to Skull Island, where they encounter the giant beast Kong. Denham then brings Kong to New York City to put him on display as entertainment, but he escapes and rampages through the city. The less faithful 1976 remake has an analogue character named Fred Wilson, portrayed by Charles Grodin.

== Characterization ==
The original Denham was based on Merian C. Cooper, creator of King Kong; both were brave men of action who made names for themselves filming nature footage in the most dangerous of territories. In some ways, Denham's travels in King Kong match the move that Cooper made when he shifted from documentary filming to narrative storytelling. While bold and willing to take risks, the original Denham is honest, putting his people in danger but never asking more of them than he does of himself. In The Son of Kong, he shows great remorse for what he has done and sorrow at the loss of Kong. As the only main character to appear in both films, he is essentially the protagonist of the duology.

=== 2005 remake ===
In the 2005 remake, Denham is much less sympathetic and more devious; characterized as a con artist willing to lie, steal, and cheat to get his film made, whatever the harm this causes anyone else. He cares for people only in so much as they are of use to him, and has no respect for human (or any other kind of) life. He buys the starving Ann a meal only because he wants her for his film. After vowing to donate the proceeds of the film to the family of a colleague killed by Skull Island natives, Denham repeats the same eulogy for his cameraman Herb, killed later on by a Venatosaurus because Denham cared more for the camera's safety than Herb's.

=== Incarnations ===
Both incarnations of Denham are prepared to face all odds to make their films, going as far as to travel to the undiscovered Skull Island just to film on location, and showing absurd bravery in getting the footage they need in the face of extreme danger. In the 1933 version, Denham usually handles the camera himself, explaining that other cameramen cannot film large animals, as they are too frightened of being attacked. Similarly, in the 2005 version, he confidently films a herd of Brontosaurus while his lead actor panics.

== Biography ==
=== 1933 films ===
As a film director, Denham had some success, but he had always been told his films would be even more profitable if he had a woman present in the film. For that reason, he tries to get an actress to accompany him on his next documentary, but no agent will send him anyone due to the risks involved. Even his usual agent Weston could not supply him with anyone. Eventually, he discovers Ann Darrow on the streets. She is at first concerned about Denham's advances, but Denham reassures her that the job will involve no "funny business".

Denham had obtained a map of Skull Island and opted to produce his next film there. He had heard of the legend of the god or spirit Kong and set out to make a film about it, believing the legend must have some basis in fact. He is, however, very secretive of the nature of the film and their destination, keeping it from his crew until the ship is well on its way to Skull Island. During the voyage, Denham sees Jack Driscoll become tender towards Ann and suggests a love interest for the film's theme, remarking, "Some big hard-boiled egg gets a look at a pretty face and bang - he cracks up and goes sappy".

Upon reaching the island, Denham attempted to establish peaceful relations with the natives, learning the native word for "friend". He was not particularly successful in this attempt. After the natives captured Ann and delivered her to Kong, Denham accompanied Driscoll and other crew members in a rescue mission. While searching, Denham and his team encountered various dinosaurs, with Denham being the first man to recognize the beasts for what they were. After surviving various attacks, Denham decided to switch his plan from producing a film to capturing Kong and sailing him to New York City. Denham expected this to be a very profitable idea.

After Kong escaped and rampaged through New York City, the creature kidnapped Ann once again but was killed by aeroplanes. Upon observing the creature's corpse, Denham famously rejected a policeman's remarks that the planes had killed him, "Oh no, it wasn't the aeroplanes. It was beauty killed the Beast".

The aftermath of the Kong debacle was not good for Denham. He was bombarded with lawsuits to such a degree that within a month he was almost bankrupt. Eventually, he is approached by Captain Englehorn, his old friend who had captained the ship that originally went to Skull Island. He, too, is having financial difficulties and they decide to skip town together and start fresh somewhere else.

After traveling around a while, they come to an island where Denham discovers a beautiful young woman, named Hilda Petersen, singing for the locals. While he is instantly attracted to Hilda, he soon has a new purpose, as he gets word from a man named Nils Hellstrom (the same man who provided him with the map of Skull Island) that there was treasure on the island. Hellstrom is lying in an attempt to get away after having caused the death of Hilda's father, but Denham and Englehorn believe him and set out to return to Skull Island.

Following a mutiny, Denham, Hilda, Englehorn, Hellstrom and Charlie the Chinese cook find themselves on the island, where the natives are (obviously) none too happy to see them and drive them away. Landing on a different part of the island, Denham discovers another giant ape (much smaller this time), who appears to be Kong's son. Denham and Hilda befriend the ape, who helps them through several difficulties.

Eventually, Denham does find treasure on the island, but also realizes that it is sinking into the ocean. A desperate escape is made, but "Little Kong" is drowned while rescuing Denham. It was Denham's intention to split the fortune four ways (Denham, Hilda, Englehorn and Charlie), but Hilda convinces him that three ways is just fine, indicating that she is throwing her fortunes in with Denham for the long haul.

=== 2005 remake ===
Denham, as portrayed by Jack Black in King Kong (2005)

In the 2005 film, Denham is a two-bit film director on the verge of bankruptcy and treated with derision by every studio in New York, despite having delivered to them some stunning natural wildlife footage. He and his devoted assistant, Preston, frantically searched for an actress to cast in his new project, eventually discovering Ann Darrow. Just as in the original, she first believes Denham is searching for a prostitute, but Denham convinces her the job will involve no "funny business".

Denham had obtained a map of Skull Island and opted to produce his next film there. This means abandoning plans to film on set, which had lost him his studio's backing. They decide to take what footage he has and sell it as stock footage to other studios. This drives Denham to steal the equipment necessary to make it to the island, but he has misinformed his crew that they were heading to Singapore, and only admits the truth to screenwriter Jack Driscoll, who is still working on the screenplay as they set off.

Upon reaching the island, Denham unsuccessfully attempts to establish peaceful relations with the natives by giving a native child a candy bar. The natives attack, killing two crew members and driving Denham and the crew back to the ship. That night, Ann is captured by the natives and delivered to Kong. Upon returning to the island, Denham is the first of the crew, besides Ann, to see Kong. Denham, Driscoll, and other crew members set off on a rescue mission. He films the first dinosaur attack on camera and films the death of a crew member in the swamp in the extended cut (though this was by accident: he was running the camera to see if it still worked, and the last crewman out of the swamp happened to be killed in its line-of-sight). He survives the attack by a Ferrucutus in the extended cut (in which no one dies, but during which some are injured), the manic Brontosaurus stampede, the swamp journey of the extended cut, and the log chasm and insect pit, during which time he loses all of the footage he had been making, causing a brief period of berserker-like fury as he lashes out at the attacking bugs, this being what keeps him alive. After surviving the insect pit, Denham decides to switch his plan from producing a film to capturing Kong and sailing him to New York City after his camera is destroyed in the incident with Kong and the log. He persuades Englehorn to use the remaining chloroform to capture Kong, reminding him that they capture live animals. He expects to make a fortune showing off Kong, and makes conflicting promises to crew on how he will divide it.

Kong eventually escapes and rampages through New York City, captures Ann and is eventually killed by aeroplanes. Upon reaching Kong's body, Denham hears a bystander commenting the aeroplanes got him. He takes one last look at Kong and says, "It wasn't the aeroplanes. It was Beauty killed the Beast".

The World of Kong: A Natural History of Skull Island, published the same year, elaborates that Denham escapes lawsuits by blaming Kong's rampage on the company that made the chrome steel chains which failed to contain him. Denham returns to Skull Island to lead a scientific expedition in 1935, along with seven successive expeditions for the next decade, escaping before the island is finally swallowed up by the sea.

=== Kong: King of Skull Island ===
Authorized by the Merian C. Cooper estate, Kong: King of Skull Island is a prequel/sequel novel to D.W. Lovelace's novelization of the 1933 film and ignores the existence of the film The Son of Kong (the novel had slipped into the public domain decades earlier, but the films had not). The story features Skull Island still in existence in 1957 and adds Denham having a wife and a son, whom he was forced to abandon and escape the Kong-related lawsuits and criminal charges. The novel's central character is Denham's son, Vincent, and Carl himself is in the story only at the beginning and near the end. The novel adds some detail to Denham's life, such as his year of birth (1896).

== Real-world history ==
=== Casting ===
In his review of the 2005 remake, film critic Roger Ebert remarked that Armstrong's performance was reminiscent of filmmaker Cecil B. DeMille, while Jack Black was reminiscent of Orson Welles. Ebert also noted that Black was criticized by other critics for being "not precisely hero material", but Ebert defended that casting decision, saying Denham was a director who did not need "big muscles".
