= Skull Island (King Kong) =

Fictional island in King Kong movie

- King Kong location
- Map of Skull Island as seen in the 1933 King Kong film
- First appearance: King Kong (1933)
- Last appearance: Monarch: Legacy of Monsters (2026)
- Created by: Edgar Wallace; Merian C. Cooper

In-universe information
- Type: Phantom island
- Location: Indian Ocean (1933 film, 1976 film, 2005 film); South Pacific Ocean (Monsterverse)
- Inhabitants: King Kong (see others)

Skull Island is a fictional island in the 1933 film King Kong and its sequels, remakes, and other stories. It is the home of King Kong and several other species of creatures, mostly prehistoric and in some cases species that should have been extinct long before the rise of the mammals, along with a primitive society of humans.

In the 1962 King Kong vs. Godzilla and the 1967 King Kong Escapes, the corresponding islands are Faro Island and Mondo Island. Kong plays a similar role in these islands as the god-like being of the land, a role he plays in all versions of the King Kong story. Skull Island's origins are unknown, but Kong and his son appear to be the only giant gorillas on the island. However, the 2005 remake shows skeletons of Kong-sized gorillas, indicating that there was once a group of many such creatures on the island. Additionally, 2017's Kong: Skull Island shows the skeletons of Kong's parents.

== History ==
=== Appearance in the 1933 films ===
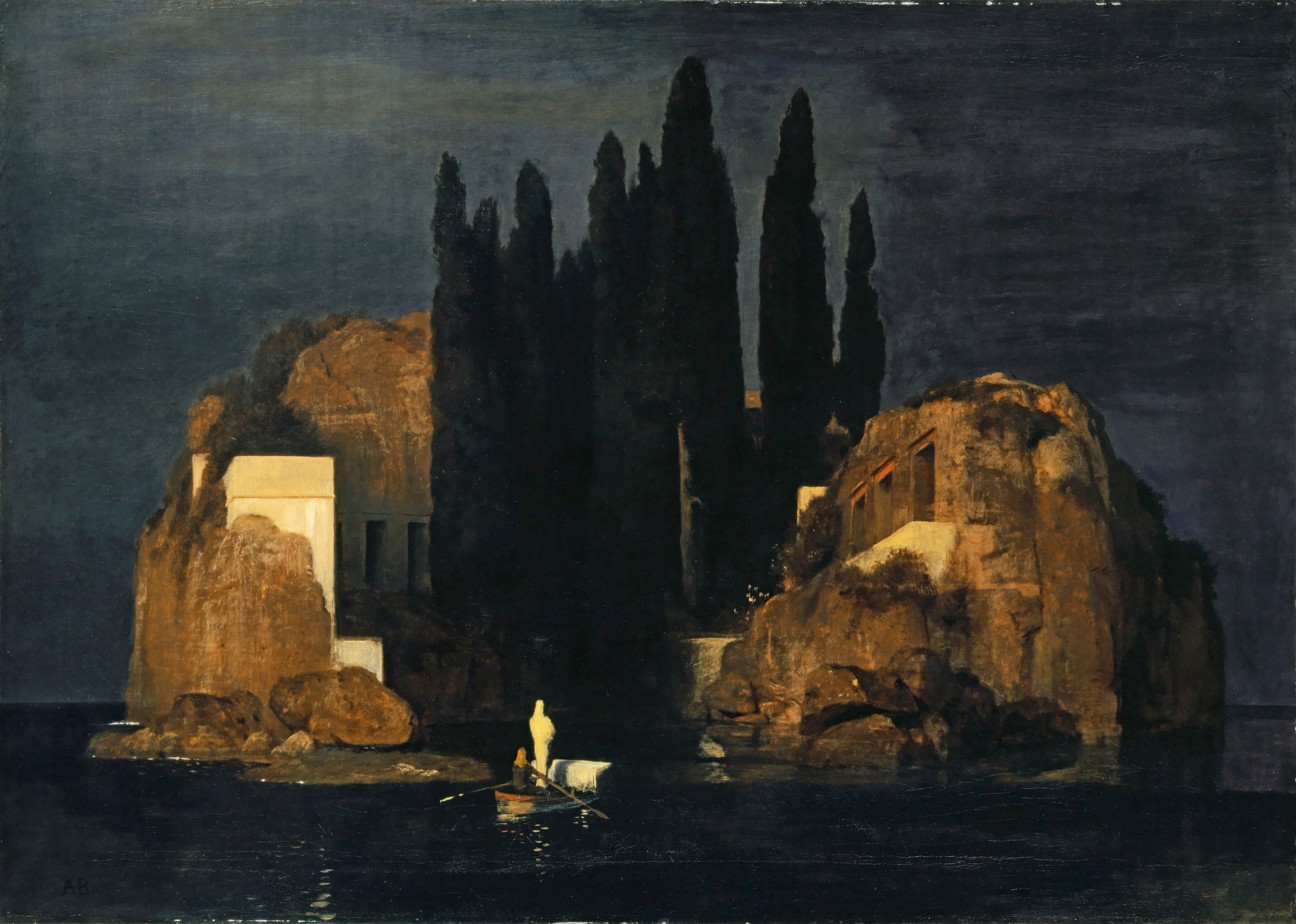
Arnold Böcklin's 1880 painting Isle of the Dead had an influence on the design of Skull Island.

In King Kong, the island is never mentioned by name and is located at approximately 12°S 78°E – 2000 miles west from the coast of Periuk, Indonesia. There is a distinctive rocky knoll in the center of the island that is shaped like a human skull, called "Skull Mountain".

According to the first film, the captain of a Norwegian barque discovered a canoe blown off course with only one native left alive. Before the native died, the captain of the barque was able to get a rough location of the island and some details on it, including its most distinctive feature – a huge wall built by the ancestors of the natives back when they had high civilization. When the protagonists of the picture arrive at the island and examine it, they find, in addition to the expected natives, prehistoric creatures of all sorts and one extremely large ape, known by those on the island as "Kong".

Other than being the "slipped back" descendants of a high civilization, the ancestry of the natives is never explained.

In the 1933 sequel film Son of Kong, Carl Denham returns to Skull Island when there was a mention of some treasure that was hidden there. He also encounters a large white gorilla, thought to be the son of King Kong, whom he names Little Kong. Skull Island sinks into the sea during a powerful earthquake. Because his foot is caught in a collapsed mound, Little Kong drowns while holding Carl Denham above the water. Denham survives unscathed, while the treasure is claimed by him and the other three survivors.

The term "Skull Island" is never used in the original films. In King Kong, only "Skull Mountain" is named, while in the sequel Son of Kong, it is simply referred to as "Kong's island". In the novelization of King Kong by Delos Lovelace, it is called "Skull Mountain Island", but RKO referred to it as "Skull Island" in some of their publicity materials.

=== 1976 remake ===
In 1976's King Kong, Skull Island is mentioned as being "the beach of the skull". It is located somewhere in the Indian Ocean, south of Java, covered by a permanent cloud bank. Various people are said to have visited the island through the centuries but returned with no clear proof. By the 1970s, it is an urban legend whose only evidence is in government secret files. It is also revealed to have a huge deposit of oil, which led a greedy oil company executive to go in search of it. Besides featuring a primitive native tribe and the giant, bipedal gorilla Kong, there is also a giant snake who appeared in Kong's lair and wanted to kill him and Dwan, but it was killed by the former.

In the 1986 sequel film King Kong Lives, Skull Island does not appear, but it was mentioned by adventurer Hank Mitchell (mistakenly calling it Kong Island), who believed that the islands Borneo and Skull Island were once a part of the same landmass in the past. The fate of this incarnation is unknown.

=== Kong: The Animated Series ===
In Kong: The Animated Series, the island was named Kong Island. Unlike previous incarnations, Kong Island was situated in the infamous Bermuda Triangle, not the Indian Ocean. Although various prehistoric creatures are seen living there, Kong Island also contains some ruins where one of them serves as the prison of the demon Chiros. It is also where Jason Jenkins and his grandmother Dr. Lorna Jenkins live along with Jason's friend Tan. Another human inhabitant is Lua, the sole survivor of the native people of the island and a female shaman.

=== Kong: King of Skull Island ===
Skull Island appears in a 2004 illustrated novel that serves as both prequel and sequel of the original "King Kong" story, conceived by Merian C. Cooper and novelized by Delos Lovelace in 1932, and authorized by the Cooper family.

Created and illustrated by Joe DeVito, and novelized by Brad Strickland and DeVito, with John Michlig, Kong: King of Skull Island depicts a Skull Island far larger than originally thought. It is either the last vestige of a volatile volcanic series of islands or the remnant of a larger landmass. Skull Island is located in the Indian Ocean, west of Sumatra, and has several much smaller islands in various locations around its perimeter, with the most prevalent of these off a small peninsula on its southeastern corner.

Skull Island contains two main mountains, the larger being shaped in the visage of a human skull. Skull Mountain is riddled with caves and passageways carved out by natural erosion, but also man-made. In earlier times, these were often used by islanders to avoid the monsters on the surface, but proved to have a multitude of dangerous denizens of their own. These include previously unknown species such as snake-like amphibians with enormous heads capable of swallowing a human whole; foot-long creatures that combine squid and crustacean characteristics with bio-luminescent sails tipped with poisonous stingers; giant spiders with 7-foot bodies and 8-foot-long legs ending in hand-like appendages.

The human civilization that inhabits Skull Island at least through the 20th century is the last remnant of a previously unknown super-race called the Tagatu (a combination of two formerly separate tribes: the Tagu and the Atu). The original culture is believed to have Asian origins that bled into an island group west of Sumatra that no longer exists. As a result of a natural disaster, they were forced to migrate to Skull Island untold millennia ago. Drawn to its spectacular makeup by their insatiable curiosity, the Tagatu believed their mastery of biological and organic sciences could overcome Skull Island's dangers. It was they who originally brought the gigantic simian Kongs there for protection and who, with the help of the Kongs, built the iconic wall across the Skull Island's peninsula for protections against Skull Island's prehistoric denizens.

Among the many mysteries revealed in the work is the reality that on Skull Island the dinosaurs never died out, but continued to evolve over the intervening 65 million years. This has resulted in strange variations on previously known species, as well as many new ones. Chief among the latter is a race of sentient dinosaurs, called Deathrunners. Bipedal, extremely aggressive and 6 to 9 feet tall, they once ruled the island and were at war with the Tagatu and the Kongs. Their race is propagated every few generations by one queen that grows to gigantic size. It is one of these, called "Gaw", that ruled Skull Island when King Kong was born and who Kong had to defeat in order to become a king.

In the story, Carl Denham's son Vincent (now a paleontologist) and an older Jack Driscoll return to Skull Island in 1957 to discover pieces of the earlier civilization's history and relationship to the island through an enigmatic Tagatu elder simply called the "Storyteller" as well as in the form of archaeological discoveries such as specially pigmented paintings in underground passageways that move when illuminated by torchlight to reveal past events on Skull Island. Primary among these is the discovery of remnants of "the Old City", which was established by the Tagatu at the zenith of their civilization in the center of the island in an ideal valley between the two mountains. The Storyteller's tale, along with Vincent and Driscoll's findings, suggest that the eerie skull visage that gave the island its name may have been the work of human hands. These and other discoveries hint that the true extent of Skull Island's secrets have yet to be revealed.

=== 2005 remake ===
In Peter Jackson's remake, Skull Island's position west of Sumatra remains the same, in a region afflicted by magnetic anomalies and violent sea storms. According to the book The World of Kong: A Natural History of Skull Island, Skull Island was geologically unstable and has been slowly sinking into the sea for the past thousand years. By 1933, the island was on the verge of destruction. Fifteen years after its discovery by the modern world, Skull Island finally sank into the ocean.

In its prehistory, Skull Island was a refuge for a variety of prehistoric creatures. Over time, more and more species arrived either by swimming, flying, rafting, or migrating through temporary land bridges. As the island slowly receded into the sea, life was forced to adapt, resulting in an ecosystem of bizarre and nightmarish creatures.

Three thousand years before, an advanced civilization from Southeast Asia migrated to Skull Island, bringing with them domesticated animals such as Gaur and the giant ancestors of Kong. This culture eventually died off, leaving behind only gigantic eroding ruins scattered around the island (such as the enormous wall) and a small society of primitive people that became the Skull Island natives.

=== Altus Press ===
To coincide with the 80th anniversary of both characters, Altus Press released an officially sanctioned novel titled Doc Savage: Skull Island in March 2013, which sees King Kong meeting pulp hero Doc Savage, written by Will Murray and artist Joe DeVito, who made the cover artwork. Set in 1920, shortly after returning from military service during World War I, Doc Savage searches for his long-lost grandfather (the legendary mariner Stormalong Savage) with his father, the explorer Clark Savage, Sr., that ultimately leads father and son to the mysterious Skull Island and its prehistoric denizens, including King Kong. In his review for the New York Journal of Books, playwright-author Mark Squirek concluded:

Across close to 400 pages Doc Savage: Skull Island takes us not only on a journey to Skull Island, but to the beginnings of a young man's rise to greatness. Mr. Murray has created a new classic of the genre – all the while staying completely true to the legends of both Kong and Doc Savage.

Altus Press also released an authorized crossover novel, King Kong vs. Tarzan, in the summer of 2016. Written by Will Murray, it tells the previously untold story of the transportation by cargo ship of Kong from Skull Island to America, and King Kong's inevitable encounter with Tarzan of the Apes.

=== Monsterverse ===
Skull Island is the main setting of Kong: Skull Island, which is set in the same universe of the 2014 film Godzilla. Kong is 104 feet (31.7 m) tall in the film and there is evidence that more of Kong's species once existed on the island. The island is located in the South Pacific and sits in the eye of a massive swirling storm system that conceals it from the outside world. This version of the island resembles a human skull when seen from the air. The island is situated atop an entrance to the Hollow Earth, which is home to large, bipedal, lizard-like predators known as "Skullcrawlers" that are referred to as the island's "devils". The Skullcrawlers wiped out King Kong's family, making him the last of his kind.

There is also evidence of dinosaurs living, or having lived, on the island, in the form of a Triceratops skull found in the "graveyard" of the island. A number of other species are referred to as "florafauna" for displaying physiological traits of plants. Similar to previous incarnations, there is a human native tribe present (characterized as Iwis) who are much less hostile than in previous versions, mainly because a stranded air pilot from World War II named Hank Marlow makes peace between them and modern-day humans. The film sees an expedition in 1973 landing upon the island after Skull Island is detected by Landsat. The animated series Skull Island sees castaways arriving on the island in the 1990s, contending with the island's wildlife and an invasive Kraken that has come to challenge Kong for control of the island.

During the credits of Godzilla: King of the Monsters, a newspaper clipping states that the awakened Titans are converging on Skull Island, which is becoming unstable. It is also revealed that Monarch has an outpost on Skull Island. Between the events of the film and Godzilla vs. Kong, the island's climate deteriorated, with a remnant of King Ghidorah's global superstorm merging with Skull Island's pre-existing storm system causing it to move inwards and make it uninhabitable, save for a domed habitat created to contain Kong. Kong would later be transported off Skull Island, and would ultimately resettle in the Hollow earth at the end of the film.

== Island wildlife ==
Besides King Kong and the natives, much of the wildlife on Skull Island consists of many kinds of prehistoric animals from each different era, such as dinosaurs. However, some of them are fictional descendants of real animals.

=== Appearing in King Kong and The Son of Kong ===
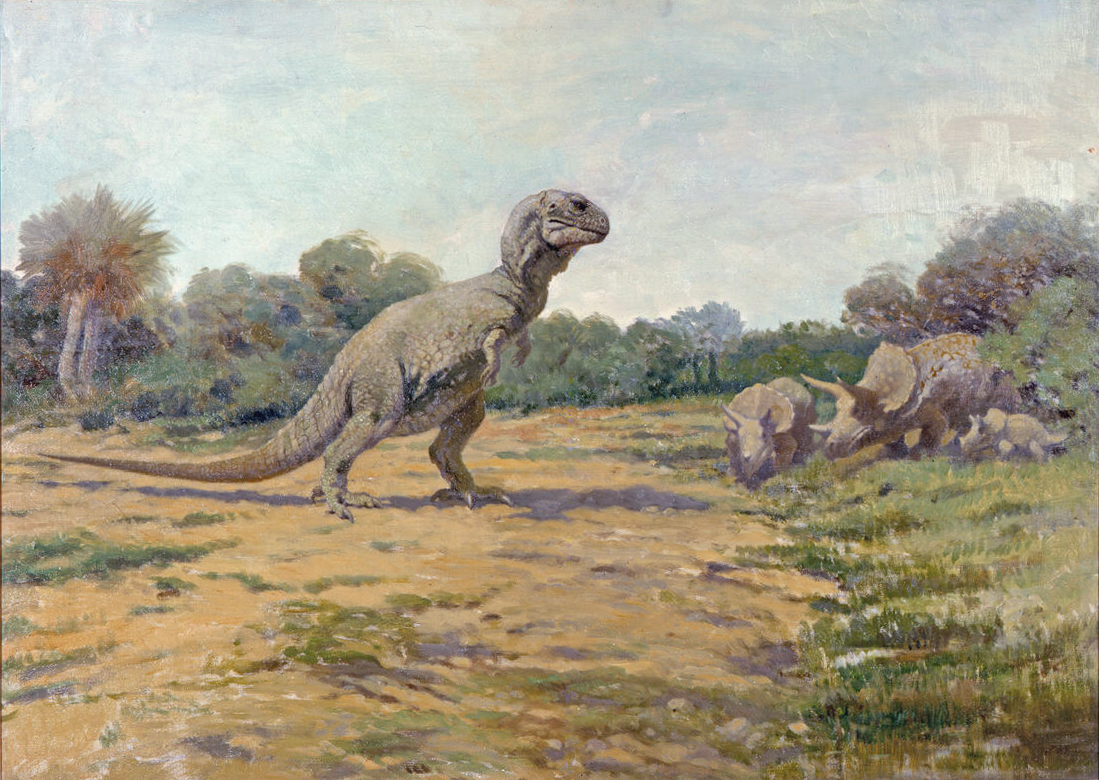
Charles R. Knight's Tyrannosaurus in the American. Museum of Natural History, which the large Tyrannosaurus of the film was based on.

- Stegosaurus – A Stegosaurus appears in a sequence in which it is disturbed by Carl Denham's crew. It charges the men and they fell it with a gas-bomb. As they walk by, it starts to get up again and is shot. Orville Goldner, who worked on the film, described the film's Stegosaur as a combination of two genera: Stegosaurus ungulatus and the less well-known Kentrosaurus. Another appeared in a deleted scene when Denham ran back to the village, after Kong's battle with the Tyrannosaurus.
- Brontosaurus – A Brontosaurus is disturbed by the rescue party's raft as it crosses a swamp and capsizes it, attacking the men in the water. Several of them are chased onto land, and one fellow is cornered while climbing a tree and maimed to death by the animal. A common misconception is that the sauropod actually eats the sailor, but it is stated in the script and observed in the film that the dinosaur kills and then abandons the body of a sailor identified as "Tim". The creature reappears in Son of Kong, crying out as the island is sinking.
- A large two-legged "lizard" – This unidentified reptilian creature climbs up a vine from the crevasse to attack Jack Driscoll. It falls back into the pit when Jack cuts the vine it is climbing. Other than the two limbs, the other distinct feature of this creature is the iguana-like ridge of spikes down its back. Orville Goldner said that it was loosely based on the features of the Desmatosuchus. In Peter Jackson's re-creation of the "spider pit sequence", it is among the monsters eating the sailors who survived the fall. This creature would inspire the Monsterverse's Skullcrawlers.
- Tyrannosaurus – A great carnivorous dinosaur that tries to eat Ann, but is fought and killed (or, at least, overpowered) by Kong, who breaks its jaw open. The dinosaur was modeled after Charles R. Knight's depiction of a Tyrannosaurus, but it possesses three fingers per hand, unlike Tyrannosaurus, which had only two (the number of fingers in Tyrannosaurus was disputed at the time, as a complete manus was not discovered until the mid-1990s). In the documentary I'm King Kong! The Exploits of Merian C. Cooper, included on the 2-disc DVD release of King Kong, Cooper refers to this beast as an Allosaurus, not a Tyrannosaurus, which would help explain the number of fingers. The creature was originally intended to be a Tyrannosaurus designed for the canceled Willis O'Brien film Creation (1931). It may also be worth noting that the Tyrannosaurus present in Willis O'Brien's earlier project The Lost World (1925) also had a third finger. The 1932 King Kong screenplay refers to the dinosaur only as a "Meat Eater".
- Tanystropheus – A highly stylized, serpentine aquatic reptile with a long neck and tail as well as two pairs of flippers. It inhabits the bubbling swamp area inside King Kong's cave. Goldner describes the Tanystropheus as being designed as more slender than the ones known to science, and its swimming limbs are less prominent. It battles Kong in the style of a giant, constricting snake.
- Archaeopteryx – The tiny birds are seen flying around in the jungle. Most notably a few fly by when the Stegosaurus enters the clearing, and one flies out of the dead tree that Kong puts Ann in before he goes to fight the sailors on the log bridge. According to Goldner, they "were made to flit among the trees on invisible wires".
- Arsinoitherium – This huge prehistoric mammal was to chase the men onto the log bridge and corner them between itself and the enraged Kong in the test reel. According to Goldner, Cooper had second thoughts about the Arsinotherium and "ordered the action to be re-filmed using a Styracosaurus. Both versions were eventually thrown out because they captured too much audience attention". This can be attested to by the fact that the sailors did not just run back across the log when Kong appeared.
- Gigantophis garstini – According to Goldner, "this huge snake that appeared in one scene and later cut out of the film, had its living prototype in Egypt". This giant snake frightens Ann at the base of the dead tree that Kong puts her in before he battles the sailors on the log bridge. It was in the test reel, but later cut. However, Ann Darrow's reaction to it being below her just before the Tyrannosaurus shows up in the clearing remains in the film.
- Erythrosuchus – It was created and then re-created for the "spider-pit sequence" and portrayed as a stout reptilian predator. Goldner stated that it was loosely adapted, as many of the creatures of the pit were imaginative.
- A giant crab, giant spider, and giant tentacled "bug" – They all appear in the original notes, script, and re-created "spider pit sequence", eating the surviving crewmen in the crevasse.
- Triceratops – in the original script only, it was encountered by Kong on volcanic flats. He hurls boulders at a herd of them and drives them into a stampede, impaling one of the crew of the Venture. It was also seen in a deleted scene in Son of Kong.
- Cave Bear – A gigantic bear that attacks Denham and Hilda, but is driven off by the Son of Kong.
- Styracosaurus – this ceratopsian corners Hellstrom, Englehorn and Charlie into a cave in Son of Kong, destroying one of their guns. This dinosaur was originally slated to appear in King Kong, chasing the crew onto the log bridge and keeping them trapped there.
- Nothosaurus – A reptile that threatens Denham and Hilda, but is fended off and killed by the Son of Kong. King Kong: A History of a Movie Icon calls the creature 'The Dragon' all through its review of Son of Kong.
- Elasmosaurus – A large marine reptile, it eats Hellstrom as he attempts to flee at the end of Son of Kong. The snapping version that grabbed Hellstrom was actually the revamped Brontosaurus from the original film; the same holds for the armature version seen briefly snarling in predatory glee.

=== Appearing in the 2005 remake ===
All the creatures in Peter Jackson's remake of King Kong are established in the companion book The World of Kong: A Natural History of Skull Island to be fictional descendants of real animals.

Among the creatures in the 2005 remake are:

- Brontosaurus baxteri – A large Brontosaurus-like sauropod which (despite the name) is more similar in size and appearance to Apatosaurus that appears early in the film. They are attacked by a pack of Venatosaurus and cause a stampede. They trample several of the crew and some of the Venatosaurus. Like real sauropods, they are social animals that organize in herds led by a dominant bull. Unlike all real sauropods, Brontosaurus give birth to between one and three live young rather than reproducing with eggs like their ancestors and other Dinosaurs did. As Skull Island's largest herbivore, they are responsible for keeping the jungle from overrunning the remaining grasslands.
- Brutornis – A phorusrhacid that is seen in the extended cut of King Kong and in The World of Kong. In the extended cut, the crew of the Venture mistake one for Ann and Lumpy shoots it by mistake when he loses his nerves. After being discovered by the crew, the dying terror bird is then killed by Lumpy.
- Ferrucutus cerastes – A giant ceratopsian. It appears only in the extended cut and in a cameo as Kong climbs to his lair. In the extended cut, a large male attacks the crew and almost kills Jack Driscoll before being killed by Hayes. Ferrucutus is an aggressive herbivore that dwells in small family groups. Like their ancestors, Ferrucutus bulls spar violently, even to the point of killing their rivals.
- Foetodon ferrus – A terrestrial notosuchian about 20 feet (6.1 metres) long that appears in both the film and the companion book. In the film, Ann stumbles across a mated pair of Foetodon feeding on a dead Ligocristus. The predators pursue her into a hollow log, and a subadult V. rex appears by killing and eating one of the pursuing Foetodon, forcing its mate to flee. Foetodon is an ambush predator that hides in deep piles of leaves, waiting for small dinosaurs and large flightless birds to wander past.
- Giant arthropods – Several species of giant arthropods appear at the bottom of the Ravine. The World of Kong names these insects as:
  - Abyscidis - Crustaceans that can grow to the size of dogs.
  - Arachnocidis – A giant arachnid.
  - Carnictis sordicus – A fluke-like creature that can grow to be several feet long. Several of them eat Lumpy.
  - Decarnocimex – A giant carnivorous cricket. Denham fights several of them.
  - Deinacrida rex – A giant species of wētā. Several tried to make a meal out of Driscoll, but were defeated by Jimmy.
  - Deplector – A giant cave-dwelling crustacean. The females are large, while the males are smaller. The arms of a female was seen shooting out of a cliff and pulling a sailor in to be devoured.
- Ligocristus – A hadrosaur that is fed upon by a Foetodon. They resemble Saurolophus, a hadrosaur from the Cretaceous.
- Megaprimatus Kong - A huge species of gorilla, they were the largest primates to have ever lived, even bigger than Gigantopithecus, the previous record holder. The average M. Kong could stand up to 6–8-meter (20–26 ft) and possibly weighed 6 tons. By 1933, there was only one of them left. This specimen, an old male, was captured and brought back to New York City by Carl Denham, but escaped and was shot down off the top of the Empire State Building, rendering the species of Megaprimatus Kong extinct.
- Moonspider - Not a true spider (it is really a member of the Solifugae), the Moonspider is a nocturnal creature that lives in the Lowlands. It appeared briefly in the film when Ann Darrow made her escape from King Kong.
- Piranhadon titanus – Only appearing in The World of Kong and more prominently in the extended cut, Piranhadon is a 50-foot (15.2-metre) fish. In the extended cut, a Piranhadon attacked the rescue team led by Hayes, Carl Denham and Jack Driscoll, killing three sailors and very nearly swallowing Driscoll whole. Piranhadon has poor vision, only being able to discern prey's silhouettes, using the barbels on its chin to sense vibrations and the light from the surface to detect passing prey.
- Terapusmordax obscenus – A giant bat-like rodent. A swarm of them appear in the film roosting in Kong's lair. When Jack Driscoll attempts to save Ann, he awakens Kong. The Terapusmordax then attack Kong; he fends them off while Jack and Ann escape by climbing down a vine. When one of the Terapusmordax attempts to kill Jack and Ann, Jack grabs the wing and the Terapusmordax lowers them down. They then fall into the river below. They also appear in the associated video game where they gain juvenile forms and a bluish, airplane-sized species. Terapusmordax evolved from hairless rodents that developed wings. They measure about 3–4 feet (0.9–1.2 metres) in body length and 8–10 feet (2.4–3.0 metres) in wingspan.
- Vastatosaurus rex – A descendant of Tyrannosaurus, but much bigger with three fingers unlike its ancestors during the Cretaceous. It appears in the film in a scene where three of them fight Kong. Vastatosaurus are the top apex predator of Skull Island. They can grow up to 50 feet (15.2 metres) long. Juveniles hunt separately from the adults in the jungle, often coming into conflict with Venatosaurus.
- Venatosaurus saevidicus – A slender dromaeosaur, measuring about 24 feet (7.3 metres) long and surpassing the length of a Utahraptor. In the film, they ate Carl Denham's cameraman Herb and caused a Brontosaurus stampede. Venatosaurus hunt in packs and are also one of only two predators on Skull Island capable of taking down an adult Brontosaurus, the other being the V. Rex. They are also highly intelligent and cunning, able to chase prey through ruins and into planned traps. Another smaller Venatosaurus species called Venatosaurus impavidus is also present on the island.

=== Monsterverse ===
The Monsterverse's version of Skull Island does not appear to be inhabited by any living dinosaurs, though an oversize Triceratops skull can be seen in the Valley of Fallen Giants, which indicates that there were dinosaurs living on the island. Much of the island's ecosystem in the film and supplementary material is populated by naturally-evolved hybrids of plant and animal, referred to as "Florofauna" by Monarch scientists.

- Apus Giganticus / Titanus Kong - A race of giant apes that live on Skull Island. By the events of Kong: Skull Island, Kong was the only Apus Giganticus living on Skull Island. He was assumed to be the last of his kind until more Apus Giganticus were found in Hollow Earth by Godzilla x Kong: The New Empire.
- Skullcrawlers - Giant carnivorous amphibians with two large forelimbs and a superficially skull-like face. Possessing voracious appetites fueled by a never-ending hunger, the Skullcrawlers drove the Kong species into extinction. In Godzilla vs. Kong, Skullcrawler eggs were smuggled off the island by the Apex Corporation and bred to serve as test subjects to prove the effectiveness of Mechagodzilla's weaponry.
- Mother Longlegs - A giant spider with legs resembling bamboo stalks.
- Sker Buffalo - A giant amphibious water buffalo with long branching horns and a coral shaped structures on their back.
- Spore Mantis - A massive stick insect resembling a fallen log.
- Leafwing - A green pterosaur-like creature with wings that allow it to camouflage in the trees and a sharp beak for cutting prey into pieces. They can also be seen living in Hollow Earth in Godzilla vs. Kong.
- Psychovulture - A relative of the Leafwing (resembling an oversized Anurognathus). Much more bat-like and capable of generating electrical breath weapons, their diet of poisonous pufferfish has increased their aggression to an almost psychopathic level, compelling them to kill creatures they have no intention of consuming.
- Death Jackal - A mammalian predator resembling a Dromaeosaur/Gorgonopsid hybrid that has a tendency to engage in cannibalism.
- Magma Turtle - A large tortoise with palm trees growing out of its stony shell, they live around a series of hot springs on the island and possess lava-like blood.
- Sirenjaw - A giant crocodilian-like creature covered in a thicket of brambles and trees it uses to camouflage itself as islands to lure in prey.
- Swamp Locust - A giant aquatic insect with branch-like legs it uses to camouflage as sunken trees to grab unsuspecting prey.
- Vinestrangler - A giant tree-dwelling katydid that camouflages among the branches and vines of its habitat to ambush its prey.
- Spirit Tiger - An oversized white tiger with elk-like antlers.

== Popular culture ==
- In Peter Jackson's 1992 film Braindead, the zombie virus originates from a Skull Island creature referred to as a Sumatran rat monkey.
- The Universal Orlando Resort location Islands of Adventure features an attraction called "Skull Island: Reign of Kong" which is based on Peter Jackson's remake.
- In the 2021 television series The Falcon and the Winter Soldier, Sam Wilson compares the fictional island nation of Madripoor, known to harbor a dangerous underworld, to Skull Island.
