= What Fun We Were Having: 4 Stories About Date Rape =

- Directed by: Adam Wingard
- Written by: Adam Wingard; Simon Barrett; E. L. Katz
- Produced by: Joe Swanberg; Travis Stevens; Alex Justinger
- Starring: Hannah Hughes; Brandon Carroll; A. J. Bowen; Amanda Crawford; Lane Hughes; Jasper Lee; Joe Swanberg
- Cinematography: Adam Wingard
- Edited by: Adam Wingard
- Music by: Jasper Lee
- Production company: Snowfort Pictures
- Release date: July 27, 2011 (Fantasia)
- Running time: 80 minutes
- Country: United States
- Language: English

What Fun We Were Having: 4 Stories About Date Rape is a 2011 American psychological drama anthology film directed by Adam Wingard and written by Wingard, Simon Barrett and E. L. Katz. It stars Hannah Hughes, A. J. Bowen, Lane Hughes, Brandon Carroll, and Amanda Crawford. It premiered at the Fantasia Festival in 2011, but did not go on to receive a commercial release, potentially due to rights issues.

== Premise ==
The film consists of four segments, entitled "Hot Boys", "The Sleep Creep", "The Meat Man" and "Silver Bullets". Each segment obliquely dramatizes an incident of sexual assault, and the four stories take place in the same small American town on four different holidays: Halloween, Thanksgiving, Christmas and Valentine's Day.

== Production ==
The film was shot in Atlanta in 2010 over a period of four days.

== Reception ==
Dread Central gave the film 4 1/2 out of 5 blades, writing that "By shifting the focus away from the violent, physical aspects of rape, Wingard breathes shades of ambiguity into his characters while saying something very deep about the nature of intimacy, treading into deeper, darker territory than the usual predator and victim clichés." JoBlo.com's Arrow in the Head noted that the stories in the film were either hit or miss, something that they stated was common with anthology films, and that the anthology was overall "an avant-garde work, which should come as no surprise coming from Adam Wingard, who's quickly establishing himself as a micro-budget David Lynch between this, and his work on A Horrible Way to Die & Pop Skull."
