= The Guest (2014 American film) =

2014 film by Adam Wingard

- Theatrical release poster
- Directed by: Adam Wingard
- Written by: Simon Barrett
- Produced by: Jessica Calder; Keith Calder
- Starring: Dan Stevens; Maika Monroe; Leland Orser; Sheila Kelley; Brendan Meyer; Lance Reddick
- Cinematography: Robby Baumgartner
- Edited by: Adam Wingard
- Music by: Steve Moore
- Production companies: HanWay Films; Snoot Entertainment
- Distributed by: Picturehouse
- Release dates: January 17, 2014 (Sundance); September 17, 2014 (United States)
- Running time: 100 minutes
- Country: United States
- Language: English
- Budget: $5 million
- Box office: $2.7 million

The Guest is a 2014 American action thriller film directed by Adam Wingard and written by Simon Barrett. The film stars Dan Stevens and Maika Monroe, with a supporting cast that includes Leland Orser, Sheila Kelley, Brendan Meyer, and Lance Reddick. It tells the story of a U.S. soldier (Stevens) called David who unexpectedly visits the Peterson family, introducing himself as a friend of their son who died in combat in Afghanistan. After he has been staying in their home for a couple of days, a series of deaths occur, and the daughter Anna (Monroe) suspects David is connected to them.

Barrett, who previously worked with Wingard on the films A Horrible Way to Die (2010) and You're Next (2011), wrote the script for The Guest. Budgeted at $5 million, filming took place in New Mexico during the summer of 2013. Musician Steve Moore scored the film's soundtrack. The film premiered at the Sundance Film Festival on January 17, 2014, and was theatrically released in the United States on September 17. The Guest received positive reviews from critics.

== Plot ==
Spencer and Laura Peterson, with their children Luke and Anna, are coping with the loss of their elder son, Caleb, to the war in Afghanistan. They are visited by David Collins, a former U.S. Army sergeant who claims he was Caleb's best friend. He tells the family he wanted to visit them as a way to help Caleb take care of them. He is polite and friendly, and Laura invites him to stay as long as he wishes.

David hears of Spencer's troubles at work, and he sees Luke return home with a bruise on his face, caused by bullies at school. The next day, David and Luke follow the bullies to a bar, where David beats them up. He then uses his knowledge of the law, as well as a bribe, to convince the bartender not to tell anyone. That evening, David goes to a Halloween party with a reluctant Anna, where he makes a good impression with her friends, and later saves her friend Kristen from her violent ex-boyfriend. David and Kristen have sex, then David asks Anna's friend Craig where he can buy a gun. On their way home, Anna offers to make David a mix CD.

He meets Craig and his friend to buy the gun, but kills them and steals their weapons. David gives Luke advice on dealing with bullies and gives him his butterfly knife.When a suspicious Anna calls the military base to ask about David, she is told that he presumably died a week earlier. The call alerts a private corporation called the KPG, headed by Major Carver, who assembles a special forces team and heads for the Peterson's home. Anna then learns about Craig's death, and that her boyfriend Zeke has been blamed for it. It is revealed that Spencer's boss died under mysterious circumstances, giving Spencer the promotion he always wanted. Anna asks Luke to research the numbers David has called on his phone.

At school, one of the bullies assaults Luke again, but he fights back by punching him in the face and hitting him with a yardstick. After they are both sent to the principal's office, David and Laura arrive. David accuses the principal of not caring about Luke facing homophobic abuse and suggests a month of after-school detentions, threatening litigation if Luke is expelled. Luke tells David of Anna's suspicions, but promises not to investigate any further or tell anyone else. While David helps Laura with the laundry, Major Carver's team attacks the house, but David kills all of them except for Carver. His cover blown, David stabs Laura with a kitchen knife. He then drives away, and kills Spencer as well.

Carver picks up Anna and informs her of her parents' deaths. He reveals that David was a test subject in a military medical experiment and was "programmed" to kill anyone who might compromise his identity, and is unlikely to be able to stop even if he wanted to. Meanwhile, David shoots Kristen in the chest and blows up the restaurant where she and Anna work. He goes to the school to kill Luke. Carver and Anna arrive at the school before David, and enter a haunted house set up for the Halloween dance. David turns off the lights and plays Anna's mix CD, then kills Luke's teacher and Carver with a boxcutter. Anna shoots David with Carver's gun, but David stabs her in the leg and attempts to choke her as the gun misfires and damages a light, starting a fire. Luke stabs David twice with the butterfly knife, which frees Anna. David tells Luke that he did the right thing and gives him a thumbs-up before collapsing.

Sitting in an ambulance, Anna and Luke overhear the firefighters say that only two corpses were recovered. As several firefighters exit the school, Anna notices one of them is limping; he turns to face her, and it is David using the disguise to quietly escape the scene.

== Cast ==
- Dan Stevens as David Collins
- Maika Monroe as Anna Peterson
- Brendan Meyer as Luke Peterson
- Sheila Kelley as Laura Peterson
- Lance Reddick as Major Richard Carver
- Leland Orser as Spencer Peterson
- Tabatha Shaun as Kristen
- Chase Williamson as Zeke Hastings
- Ethan Embry as Higgins
- Joel David Moore as Craig
- Steven John Brown as Mike
- Brenden Wedner as Ian
- Alex Knight as Mr. Lyles
- Frank Bond as Mr. Alston
- Jesse Luken as Drew
- Kelsey Montoya as Jason
- Justin Yu as Blair
- A. J. Bowen as Austin
- Chris Ellis as Hendricks
- Candice K. Patton as Sgt. Halway
- Chris Harding as Caleb Peterson

== Production ==
=== Writing ===
Simon Barrett, who previously collaborated with Adam Wingard on the films A Horrible Way to Die and You're Next, wrote the script for The Guest. Barrett said, "one of the things that excites me the most is to have established a pre-existing dynamic like a nuclear family, then introduce an element that's disruptive [...] I love just movies where a stranger comes to town “High Plains Drifter"-style. Similarly to their previous films, Barrett envisioned The Guest with a main character "harboring a secret". The character was inspired by Barrett's former occupation as a private investigator; he said it "really compartmentalized my life [...] so I've become fascinated by characters that just have a weird interior thing going on". Keith Calder and Jessica Calder served as producers, who also produced You're Next. Wingard describes his working relationship with them as "positive" and "respectful".

=== Casting and filming ===
Casting choices focused on character actors. On June 11, 2013, Dan Stevens signed on to star as the titular character, David. To prepare for the role, he spent hours in the gym to gain muscle. Wingard stated Stevens was the only serious contender for the role of David. "It was a very expedited schedule in terms of the casting [...] It was pretty much only Dan or bust", Wingard said. When casting Stevens, Barrett and Wingard knew that Stevens would be likable, and found him to be "calm and cool" and "naturally charming". They said the film title made the story obvious, and though audiences may cheer on his character for his entertainment value, he is clearly the antagonist of the film, something audiences will easily recognize. Maika Monroe was signed on for the role as Anna on June 26. On July 8, two additional cast members were confirmed; Brendan Meyer, who plays Luke, and Lance Reddick, who plays Major Richard Carver.

On July 17, 2013, the New Mexico Film Office announced the start of the production of The Guest. Principal photography took place in various locations including Moriarty, Edgewood and Estancia, and continued until the end of August 2013. Monroe described the filming process as "light-hearted [...] There's a lot of comedy in The Guest, so it was a bit more fun".

== Music ==
Before filming began, Wingard thought about the music first. "For this film I was mostly inspired by electronic/goth bands of the 80s", he said. The film score was composed by Steve Moore, and includes synthwave tracks from artists such as Clan of Xymox and Survive. J-2 Music released the soundtrack on September 16, 2014.

== Release ==
According to Wang, the rough cut of The Guest was about 20 minutes longer than the theatrical version. The rough cut was screened to a test audience, but viewers responded negatively, which resulted in shortening of the runtime. After another test screening, the audience was confused at the sudden arrival of Major Richard Carver and his team at the Peterson home, which is why some scenes with Carver at KPG headquarters were added in final cut of the film. Other footage which was edited or deleted after test screenings were scenes which explained what exactly "David" is, what happened to him, why he commits some of the acts in the story, and more details about the KPG program that he was involved in. Test audiences felt that the plot explanation was too much, a view shared by Wingard and Barrett, who "hated" explaining David's character and his background because they wanted to leave it ambiguous, and were thus happy to cut those scenes from the film.

On March 7, 2014, Picturehouse acquired the distribution rights to the film. To promote the film, the studio released a teaser trailer on June 26, 2014, followed by a second trailer on August 6.

== Reception ==
=== Box office ===
The Guest premiered at the Sundance Film Festival on January 17, 2014. The film premiered in the United Kingdom on September 5, 2014, to 274 theaters. It finished in eighth place, grossing $511,040. After four weeks, the film grossed $1,352,579. The United States theatrical release was on September 17, 2014, to 19 theaters. During the first weekend, the film earned $84,527. At its widest release, the film was in 53 theaters. After six weeks, the film grossed $332,890, and earned $2.7 million worldwide.

=== Home media ===
Universal Studios released The Guest on 2-disc DVD, and on Blu-ray with Digital Copy and UltraViolet abilities, on January 6, 2015. The DVD also includes an audio commentary by Wingard and Barrett, and 15-minutes of deleted scenes. In October 2021, the film was released on Ultra HD Blu-ray by Second Sight Films.

=== Critical response ===
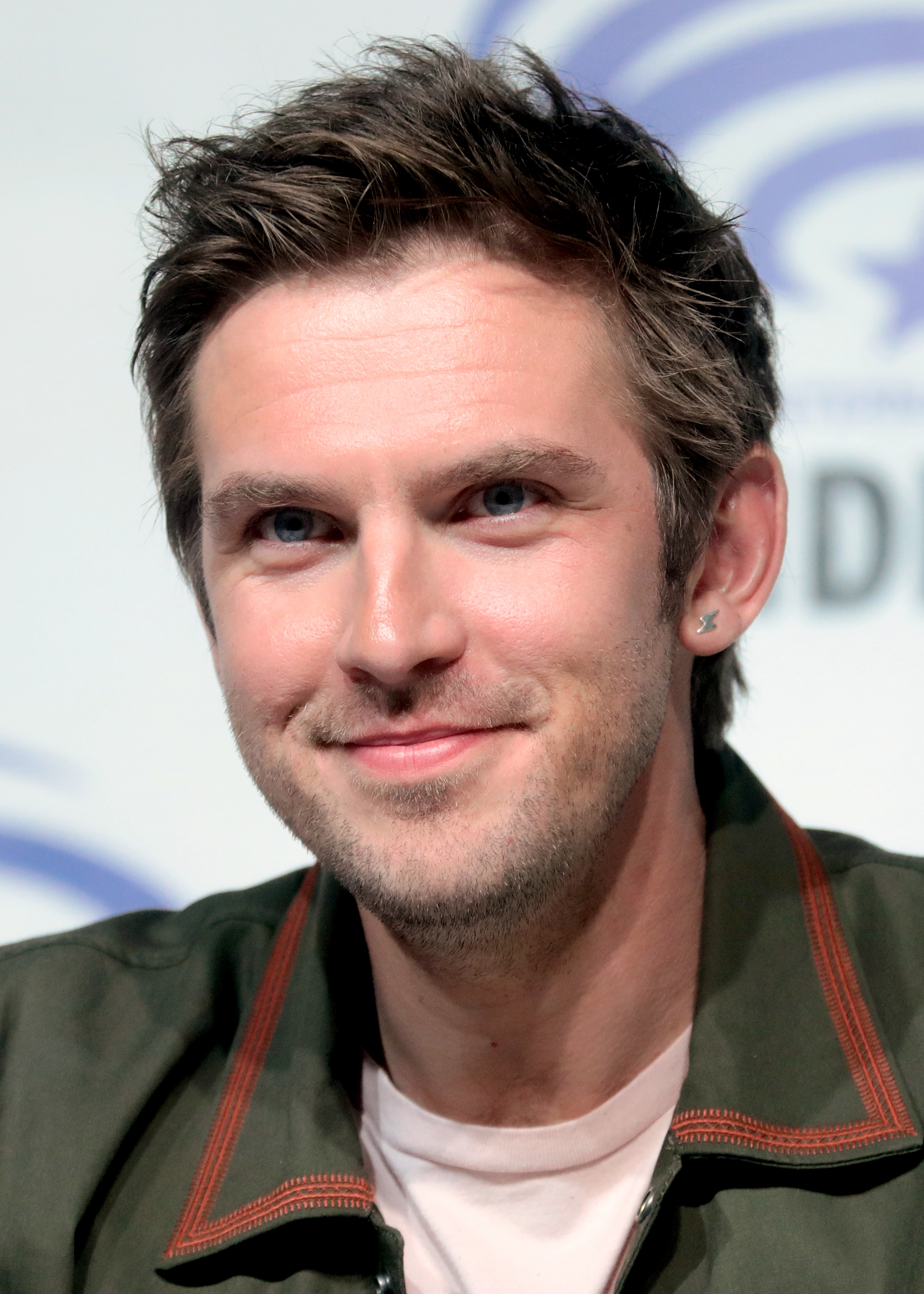
Dan Stevens (pictured in 2019) was praised for his performance.

Review aggregator website Rotten Tomatoes gives the film an approval rating of 92% based on 122 reviews, with an average rating of 7.5/10. The site's critics consensus states, "Boasting enough intelligence to bolster its darkly violent thrills, The Guest offers another treat for genre fans from director Adam Wingard." On Metacritic, the film has a weighted average score of 76 out of 100 based on 29 critics, indicating "generally favorable reviews".

Robert Abele of the Los Angeles Times described the film as a "dirty-sexy-funny homage to the vise-grip corkers that marked John Carpenter' and James Cameron's indie heyday", and praised Stevens' "killer personality" which brings The Guest to life. Another critic, Peter Travers of Rolling Stone, also agreed the film was "fun" and praised Stevens' "mesmerizing" performance. Writing for The New York Times, Jeannette Catsoulis complimented Wingard and Barrett's ability in tackling another familiar genre together; she thought Stevens' performance was restrained but "magnetic" as the story develops. London Evening Standard's Charlotte O'Sullivan was equally impressed by the director and writer duo; the critic gave the film 4 out of 5 stars and opined that Stevens' was "perfect" for the lead role. Dennis Harvey of Variety, while critical of the horror homage and ending, thought "The Guest is blood-soaked action trash of a high grade". He credited the soundtrack for underlining the film's vintage style. The reviewer from Spin magazine also praised the "quintessentially Halloween" soundtrack, and drew comparisons to it with the music from Drive (2011).

Of Stevens' performance, the critic from The Telegraph opined that it was reminiscent of Ryan Gosling in Drive and Only God Forgives (2013). However, he thought the logic in the film was lost in the third act, arguing Wingard was "a little shameless". Chuck Bowen of Slant magazine enjoyed the 1980s themes and cinematography. "Reds [...] are gorgeously vibrant, and the intentional grain texture, meant to give The Guest a somewhat timeless look, comes through subtly. The intentional glare of certain lighting is crisp, and the blacks are beautifully inky. The sound mix, which should be heard loud, boasts impressive nuance and heft", he wrote. Fearnet praised the cast performances and overall remarked that it was "a slick, fast, fun thriller flick." The A.V. Club gave the film a "B+" rating and said that "Dumb fun is rarely this smartly delivered." Bloody Good Horror gave the film a rating of 8/10 and commented, "Mixing elements from such classics like Halloween, The Terminator, and using the framework of Molière's hidden-identity classic Tartuffe keeps this modern 80's thriller on par with some of the best homages seen in recent memory." Awarding the film five stars in The List, Emma Simmonds said it "combines B-movie gratification with A-grade filmmaking flair... a cult classic is born."

=== Accolades ===
Awards
Award	Category	Recipient(s)	Outcome	Refs.
BloodGuts UK Horror Awards 2014	Best Film	The Guest	Won	
BloodGuts UK Horror Awards 2014	Best Actor	Dan Stevens	Won	
BloodGuts UK Horror Awards 2014	Best Soundtrack/Score	Steve Moore	Won	
BloodGuts UK Horror Awards 2014	Best Director	Adam Wingard	Nominated	
Detroit Film Critics Society 2014	Breakthrough Artist	Dan Stevens	Nominated	
Empire Awards 2015	Best Male Newcomer	Dan Stevens	Nominated	
Empire Awards 2015	Best Horror	The Guest	Nominated	
Golden Schmoes Awards 2014	Best Horror Movie of the Year	The Guest	Nominated	
Golden Schmoes Awards 2014	Breakthrough Performance of the Year	Dan Stevens	Nominated	
Independent Spirit Awards 2015	Best Editing	Adam Wingard	Nominated	
Saturn Awards 2015	Best Thriller Film	The Guest	Nominated	
Saturn Awards 2015	Best Actor	Dan Stevens	Nominated	

== Sequel ==
=== Development ===
While a feature film sequel was never produced, Lakeshore Records released in 2022 a sequel in the form of an 80's Synth inspired soundtrack entitled The Guest 2: Original Soundtrack. The soundtrack features contributions by OGRE Sound, Steve Moore, Ghost Cop, Adam Wingard, Xander Harris, and Lone Runner. Later that year, Wingard noted that the sequel soundtrack was originally intended as a "fun music-based project" but teased that it has inspired him and Barrett to potentially pursue a feature length sequel and that Stevens has expressed interest in reprising his role. Wingard also teased that the sequel may become a limited series instead of a film. In 2024, Wingard revealed that he and Stevens discussed potential ideas while filming Godzilla x Kong: The New Empire and that he included a track from The Guest 2 soundtrack into the film for fans; the track, "Hardwired" by Jordan F, was featured in a scene where characters played by Stevens, Rebecca Hall, and Kaylee Hottle approach a Hollow Earth aircraft. Wingard also expressed regret over not filming the sequel before Reddick's death, stating that Reddick's character would have been brought back. That same year, Stevens was hesitant to answer questions related to the sequel, stating that its future depends on Wingard and Barrett; Stevens admitted that he spoke with Wingard about potentially collaborating on other projects, with The Guest II being one possible prospect. In regards to the sequel soundtrack, Stevens said, "in some ways, we tried to appease the fans by releasing a soundtrack to The Guest II, before a movie is even in existence."

=== Related films ===
In July of 2026 after previously being referred to as a "spiritual sequel", writer/director Adam Wingard confirmed that Onslaught takes place within the same continuity as The Guest. Elaborating further that the character David Collins from The Guest was a part of the same organization that the 2026 movie depicts, the filmmaker noted that he considers You're Next to be a part of a trilogy in the same continuity.

The connections were later clarified through the fictional secret security detail entity, referred to as the KPG. Initially referenced in You're Next by the main characters, the operating functions of establishment were explored in greater detail during The Guest through its lead super-soldier character named David Collins. Portrayed by Dan Stevens, the plot includes actions enforced by the KPG to hinder David's actions, who the company views as the recovery of a secret asset who has gone rogue. In Onslaught the company is explored further through the evolution of their super-soldier program. In the third installment, Stevens plays a powerful figure named Dr. Hans Klammer who works for Priapus which is depicted as a branch of the same organization. Depicted as the descendant of a Nazi scientist, Klammer furthers the KPG experimentations.

After explaining that KPG is an acronym which the franchise has so far revealed stands for Klammer Priapus G., Wingard confirmed plans to provide the audience with its full name; while stating that future installments in the franchise will explore the relationship of the Collins and Klammer characters. Stevens similarly confirmed that internal discussions regarding the final scenes of Onslaught setting up the future of the franchise.
