= Simon Barrett =

Simon Barrett may refer to:

- Simon Barrett (cricketer) (born 1988), English cricketer
- Simon Barrett (filmmaker) (born 1978), American writer, producer, and actor
