= Seance (2021 film) =

- Theatrical release poster
- Directed by: Simon Barrett
- Written by: Simon Barrett
- Produced by: Russell Ackerman; Tomas Deckaj; John Schoenfelder; Alex Mace; Adam Wingard
- Starring: Suki Waterhouse; Madisen Beaty; Ella-Rae Smith; Inanna Sarkis; Seamus Patterson; Marina Stephenson-Kerr
- Cinematography: Karim Hussain
- Edited by: James Vandewater
- Music by: Sicker Man
- Production companies: Dark Castle Entertainment; HanWay Films; Ingenious Media; Addictive Pictures
- Distributed by: RLJE Films
- Release date: May 21, 2021 (United States)
- Running time: 92 minutes
- Countries: United States; United Kingdom
- Language: English

Seance is a 2021 supernatural horror film written and directed by Simon Barrett. It was released on May 21, 2021, by RLJE Films.

== Plot ==
One night at the Edelvine Academy for Girls, a clique of girls led by ruthless popular girl Alice, play a prank on their classmate Kerrie by faking a haunting by the Edelvine Ghost, an urban legend involving a student who killed herself. Upset, Kerrie goes back to her dorm room where she glimpses a figure watching her. When the girls hear her screams, and rush into her room, they discover Kerrie dead, having fallen out of her dorm room window.

New student Camille Meadows takes Kerrie's place at the academy. She meets headmistress Mrs. Landry and her son Trevor who works as a handyman. Student Helina shows Camille to her room, which happens to be Kerrie's old room. Camille notices strange supernatural occurrences in the dorm room. Camille encounters Alice and the members of her clique; Bethany, Yvonne, Rosalind, and Lenora. The group harasses Camille and Helina until a fight breaks out. Mrs. Landry sentences the girls to spend detention in the library. Alice convinces Camille and Helina to join her and the others in a seance to contact Kerrie. Although Camille and Helina expect another prank, the group is stunned when they actually make contact with a spirit, which warns them that they will be murdered. The group wonder if they communicated with Kerrie or the Edelvine Ghost. Later that night, Lenora is attacked and killed by an unseen assailant.

The next day, Mrs. Landry questions the girls on Lenora's unusual disappearance, and informs them her personal items are missing, suspecting she has run away. The group investigates her room with Trevor's help, and discovers a strange cross drawn in blood on Lenora's bed. Camille later identifies the cross as a symbol on a pendant worn by Alicia Kane, the deceased student who supposedly became the Edelvine Ghost. Later that night, Rosalind is killed in the shower with her body being discovered by Camille. The death is presumed an accident. Unsettled, Camille visits Helina, and they discuss the possibility of ghosts. Bethany spots a masked figure in her room, which disappears when she screams for help. Bethany claims it is the Edelvine Ghost, but Mrs. Landry dismisses it as a bad dream while Camille is also unconvinced it was a ghost since Bethany was able to scare it away.

Camille, Helina, Alice, Bethany, and Yvonne meet for another seance to contact Rosalind, and ask her what happened. Rosalind's spirit states she was murdered, and identifies Camille as the killer. Alice attacks Camille while the others grow suspicious of Camille. While practicing for her dance recital, Yvonne is murdered by the masked figure Bethany saw. After another haunting from Kerrie, Camille moves in with Helina, and the two comfort each other over recent events. Alice receives a text from Yvonne asking her to go outside where she discovers Lenora's corpse before being knocked out by the masked assailant. Camille tries to follow Alice, but is knocked unconscious by another masked assailant.

Camille awakens restrained in the library next to an unconscious Alice. Bethany and Trevor reveal themselves as the killers and secret lovers, having murdered Kerrie and Alice's clique in an attempt to hide the fact that Bethany stole an essay from Kerrie, from which Bethany ended up winning a $250,000 scholarship. Bethany also reveals she faked the communication with the spirits at the seances, and that Trevor murdered Alicia Kane who was his babysitter and faked her suicide. Bethany states her plan to murder Alice, frame Camille for the murders, and then tie up any loose ends by killing Helina in a faked suicide. Camille reveals that she is not really Camille, having assumed Camille Meadows's identity in order to avenge her friend Kerrie. The power goes out, causing Bethany to leave and fix it. As Trevor threatens Camille, Helina knocks him unconscious, and frees Camille and Alice, having then been led to the library by Kerrie's ghost.

The trio attempts to escape, but the power comes back on, and Bethany ambushes them. Camille fends Bethany off and stabs her in the neck with a light bulb, killing her. Alice and Helina escape the library as Trevor reawakens. Camille manages to decapitate him with a bookshelf. Camille retrieves some photos of her and Kerrie from her dorm room, and goes to leave only to be confronted by Helina. Camille tells Helina about her faked identity while Helina asks how she will find Camille in the future. Camille kisses Helina, waving both her and Kerrie's ghost goodbye before leaving the academy campus.

== Cast ==
- Suki Waterhouse as Camille Meadows
- Madisen Beaty as Bethany
- Inanna Sarkis as Alice
- Ella-Rae Smith as Helina
- Stephanie Sy as Yvonne
- Djouliet Amara as Rosalind Carlisle
- Jade Michael as Lenora
- Seamus Patterson as Trevor Landry
- Marina Stephenson Kerr as Mrs. Landry
- Megan Best as Kerrie Riley

== Production ==
In October 2019, it was announced Suki Waterhouse had joined the cast of the film, with Simon Barrett directing from a screenplay he wrote. In November 2019, Inanna Sarkis joined the cast of the film. In December 2019, Madisen Beaty joined the cast of the film. Principal photography began in November 2019.

== Release ==
In February 2021, RLJE Films and Shudder acquired distribution rights to the film in North America, the U.K., Ireland, Australia, and New Zealand, and set it for a May 21, 2021, theatrical release, with a Shudder premiere to follow.

== Reception ==
On the review aggregator website Rotten Tomatoes, 47% of 66 critics' reviews are positive. The website's consensus reads: "Writer-director Simon Barrett has a certain filmmaking flair, but it isn't enough to raise Seance above its somewhat pedestrian story." Reviewing the film for indieWire, Kate Erbland stated the film "doesn't just grow more mysterious, gory, and spiky as it goes on, it also grows more convoluted". Lena Wilson with The New York Times said "when the film does choose a genre, it occasionally sticks the landing, but Seance ultimately feels jumbled".
