= Onslaught (film) =

2026 film by Adam Wingard

- Theatrical release poster
- Directed by: Adam Wingard
- Screenplay by: Simon Barrett
- Story by: Adam Wingard; Simon Barrett
- Produced by: Aaron Ryder; Andrew Swett; Adam Wingard; Jeremy Platt; Alexander Black; Simon Barrett
- Starring: Adria Arjona; Dan Stevens; Eric Wareheim; Reginald VelJohnson; Michael Biehn; Alex Pereira; Drew Starkey; Rebecca Hall
- Cinematography: Oren Soffer
- Edited by: Josh Schaeffer; Adam Avery
- Music by: Matt Pusti
- Production companies: A24; Lyrical Media; Ryder Picture Company; Breakaway Civilization; 828 Productions
- Distributed by: A24
- Release date: September 4, 2026
- Running time: 93 minutes
- Country: United States
- Language: English
- Budget: $15 million
- Box office: $3.5 million

Onslaught is a 2026 American action thriller film (Note: The film is considered to be genre-bending; sources have described the film as being within the genres of action, thriller, science fiction, and horror (including slasher).) directed by Adam Wingard and written by Simon Barrett, starring Adria Arjona, Dan Stevens, Eric Wareheim, Reginald VelJohnson, Michael Biehn, Alex Pereira, Drew Starkey, and Rebecca Hall. Set in the same continuity as The Guest, the film follows an army sniper as she struggles to protect her young daughter from an army of genetically engineered super soldiers who escaped from a secret military facility.

Onslaught was released in the United States by A24 on September 4, 2026. The film received mixed reviews from critics and has grossed $3.5 million against a $15 million budget, making it a box office disappointment.

== Plot ==
In a remote facility in New Mexico, Nazi scientist Dr. Hans Kammler conducts research to develop a trio of super soldiers on behalf of the United States government. Three subjects, dubbed Crybaby, Cockroach, and the Butcher, were selected from US military personnel based on a demonstrated ability to survive and kill without mercy. Through surgical modification and psychological conditioning, they have been imbued with enhanced strength, endurance, durability, muscular control, night-vision, and a relentless drive to kill.

Government agent Baylor observes an exercise in which regular soldiers test the trio's abilities. All three seemingly die from cardiac arrest, but have in fact consciously lowered their heart rates to appear dead. When their supervisors unknowingly enter the arena, Hans, Baylor, and Baylor's men are all killed and the trio flee from the facility.

A former Army sniper named Celeste manages a nearby trailer park with her daughter Daisy. Celeste tells Daisy about a fellow soldier who challenged her to a fight. The soldier, who became the Butcher, chose Celeste because he believed she was an easy target. Celeste won by kicking him in the testicles.

The trio slaughters everyone in a truck stop and head to the trailer park in a stolen truck. A government operative named Cyrus has been deployed to contain the situation. Hans' wife Hanna assumes control and contacts Cyrus, explaining the trio were developed specifically for use against civilian populations. She instructs him to observe and report on their performance but not to engage with them.

The trio kills numerous residents of the trailer park and Celeste is wounded while protecting Daisy from Cockroach. Vietnam veteran Josiah shoots Cockroach, and the trio regroups and cuts the electricity to the park. Daisy, Celeste, and Josiah hide in the trailer of police officer Kovacks but Josiah is injured by Cockroach. Butcher finds photos of himself with Celeste during their military services. Kovacks is chased to his cruiser by Cockroach, who is fatally shot by Celeste. Celeste and Daisy get into the cruiser and leave the unconscious Josiah behind. Crybaby bursts through the passenger seat and repeatedly stabs Kovacks, who shoots him and drives into a dumpster, killing them both. Celeste retrieves Cockroach's chainsaw and confronts Butcher, armed with a meat cleaver and fire axe. Butcher lowers his balaclava, revealing his identity to Celeste and reminding her of his vendetta. They charge each other and Celeste severs his leg with the chainsaw, then kills him.

Cyrus approaches Celeste, Daisy, and Josiah afterwards and offers to relocate them in exchange for their silence. Hanna tells Cyrus she considers the ordeal a successful demonstration of the super soldiers' capabilities and orders him to keep the survivors under observation.

== Cast ==
- Adria Arjona as Celeste Cross, a former army sniper
- Alex Pereira as The Butcher, a former martial artist-turned-super soldier
- Blake Kennedy as Daisy, the daughter of Celeste
- Reginald VelJohnson as Josiah, a Vietnam War veteran and Celeste's neighbor
- Eric Wareheim as Kovacks, a police officer and Celeste's neighbor
- Dave Campbell as The Cockroach, a soldier-turned-super soldier
- Tyler Hall as The Crybaby, a soldier-turned-super soldier
- Drew Starkey as Cyrus, a cleaner for the U.S. government
- Dan Stevens as Hans Kammler, a former Nazi scientist
- Michael Biehn as Baylor, a U.S. government agent who reviews Hans' work on the super soldiers
- Rebecca Hall as Hanna Kammler, the wife of Hans
- Maurice Greene as Teddy, Celeste's neighbour
- Leon M. Brown as Larkin, a U.S. government operative and Cyrus' enforcer
- Jacob Scipio as Griffin, the ex-husband of Celeste

== Production ==
The Hollywood Reporter announced Onslaught in May 2024, unveiling Adam Wingard and Simon Barrett writing and Wingard directing for A24, Aaron Ryder's Ryder Picture Company, and Lyrical Media. In the same month, it was announced that Wingard would not direct Godzilla x Kong: Supernova (2027) due to his scheduling commitments with Onslaught. By September 2024, Adria Arjona entered talks to star in the film. From October 2024 through January 2025, Alex Pereira, Dan Stevens, Michael Biehn, Drew Starkey, Rebecca Hall, Eric Wareheim, and Reginald VelJohnson joined the cast; Stevens previously collaborated with Wingard on The Guest (2014) and Godzilla x Kong: The New Empire (2024), the latter also starring Hall.

Principal photography began in November 2024, in Albuquerque, New Mexico, and lasted until January 2025.

== Release ==
Onslaught was released in the United States by A24 on September 4, 2026.

== Reception ==
On the review aggregator website Rotten Tomatoes, 59% of 138 critics' reviews are positive, with an average rating of 6.0/10. The website's consensus reads: "Drenched in gonzo old-school gore effects and stylishly crafted action, Onslaught unleashes a story that ultimately lacks the substance and primal fury its title promises." Metacritic, which uses a weighted average, assigned the film a score of 57 out of 100, based on 30 critics, indicating "mixed or average" reviews. Audiences polled by CinemaScore gave the film an average grade of "C" on an A+ to F scale.

== Related films ==
In July 2026, after previously being referred to as a "spiritual sequel", writer/director Adam Wingard confirmed that Onslaught takes place within the same continuity as The Guest. Elaborating further that the character David Collins from The Guest was a part of the same organization that the 2026 movie depicts, the filmmaker noted that he considers You're Next to be a part of a trilogy in the same continuity.

The connections were later clarified through the fictional secret security detail entity, referred to as the KPG. Initially referenced in You're Next by the main characters, the operating functions of establishment were explored in greater detail during The Guest through its lead super-soldier character named David Collins. Portrayed by Dan Stevens, the plot includes actions enforced by the KPG to hinder David's actions, who the company views as the recovery of a secret asset who has gone rogue. In Onslaught the company is explored further through the evolution of their super-soldier program. In the third installment, Stevens plays a powerful figure named Dr. Hans Kammler who works for Priapus which is depicted as a branch of the same organization. Depicted as the descendant of a Nazi scientist, Hans furthers the KPG experimentations.

After explaining that KPG is an acronym which the franchise has so far revealed stands for Kammler Priapus G., Wingard confirmed plans to provide the audience with its full name; while stating that future installments in the franchise will explore the relationship of the David and Hans characters. Stevens similarly confirmed that internal discussions regarding the final scenes of Onslaught setting up the future of the franchise.
