= We Are Still Here =

We Are Still Here may refer to:

- We Are Still Here (2015 film), a 2015 American horror film set in a rural New England house
- We Are Still Here (2022 film), a 2022 Australian-New Zealand anthology film telling indigenous stories
