= 24 Exposures =

- Theatrical release poster
- Directed by: Joe Swanberg
- Written by: Joe Swanberg
- Produced by: Alex Orr; Alexander Motlagh
- Starring: Adam Wingard; Simon Barrett; Helen Rogers; Caroline White; Sophia Takal
- Cinematography: Adam Pinney
- Edited by: Joe Swanberg
- Music by: Jasper Lee
- Production company: Popfilms
- Distributed by: IFC Midnight
- Release dates: August 4, 2013 (Fantasia International Film Festival); January 24, 2014 (United States)
- Running time: 77 minutes
- Country: United States
- Language: English

24 Exposures is a 2013 erotic thriller film written and directed by Joe Swanberg. It stars Adam Wingard as a fetish photographer who becomes involved in a murder mystery and Simon Barrett as the detective who investigates the crime. IFC Midnight distributed it on January 24, 2014, in a limited release and through video on demand.

== Plot ==
Billy, a fetish photographer who specializes in staged depictions of dead women, becomes involved in a murder mystery when one of his models turns up dead for real. Michael Bamfeaux, a depressed police detective, investigates the crime and probes Billy as to why he chooses to involve himself in the world of exploitation and fetish. Billy can not explain why he does what he does, except that he accepts that he is attracted to certain ideas and women. As the two men become friendlier, Michael becomes more involved in Billy's photoshoots. When Alex, Billy's girlfriend, is attacked by a jealous model with whom Billy and Alex had a threesome, Michael shoots and kills Alex's attacker. Michael later attempts to sell his memoirs, but a literary agent suggests that the story's loose ends and weak protagonist are not a good sell.

== Cast ==
- Adam Wingard as Billy
- Simon Barrett as Michael Bamfeaux
- Helen Rogers as Rebecca
- Caroline White as Alex
- Sophia Takal as Callie
- Mike Brune as Greg Lyon
- Caitlin Stainken as Amy
- Joe Swanberg as Literary Agent

== Production ==
Swanberg was inspired by the collaborations between Wingard and Barrett in previous films, whom he called an "odd couple" with opposing personalities. Swanberg also wanted to discuss the reasons why people are drawn to exploitation and genre films.

== Release ==
24 Exposures premiered at the 2013 Fantasia International Film Festival on August 4, 2013. Shortly after, IFC Midnight acquired distribution rights to the film. It was distributed via a limited theatrical release and through video on demand on January 24, 2014. It was released on DVD on May 27, 2014.

== Reception ==
Rotten Tomatoes, a review aggregator, reports that 35% of 20 surveyed critics gave the film a positive review; the average rating was 5/10. Metacritic rated it 42/100 based on ten reviews. John DeFore of The Hollywood Reporter criticized the acting and wrote that the film is "mostly for Swanberg devotees." Gary Goldstein of the Los Angeles Times wrote, "Unfortunately, this would-be erotic thriller is just too unfocused and slapdash to satisfy its promise." Andy Webster of The New York Times called it a "slight effort" that "ultimately becomes a queasy bromance, the foundation of which is less than flattering." Bruce Ingram of The Chicago Sun-Times compared it to Cinemax After Dark and called it "a clever idea that never got past the concept stage". Ignatiy Vishnevetsky of The A.V. Club rated it B− and wrote, "24 Exposures isn't entirely successful, though it is packed with ideas". Chuck Bowen of Slant Magazine rated it 3/4 stars and wrote, "Though 24 Exposures often appears to be more of a sketch for a future film than the ultimate realization of these ideas, it shows a gifted filmmaker threatening to update the formal self-reflexivity of a craftsman like Brian De Palma for a generation that's growing increasingly accustomed to images rendered more privately, and considerably more on the fly." Evan Dickson of Bloody Disgusting rated it 3.5/5 stars and wrote, "As a rule, if you hate what most people consider to be mumblecore, this isn't the movie for you. But if you're open to this somewhat shambolic riff on noir, you might find yourself pleasantly surprised."
