= You're Next =

2013 American slasher film by Adam Wingard

- Theatrical release poster
- Directed by: Adam Wingard
- Written by: Simon Barrett
- Produced by: Keith Calder; Jessica Wu; Simon Barrett; Kim Sherman
- Starring: Sharni Vinson; Nicholas Tucci; Wendy Glenn; A. J. Bowen; Joe Swanberg; Barbara Crampton; Rob Moran
- Cinematography: Andrew Droz Palermo
- Edited by: Adam Wingard
- Music by: Jasper Justice Lee; Kyle McKinnon; Mads Heldtberg; Adam Wingard
- Production companies: HanWay Films; Snoot Entertainment
- Distributed by: Lionsgate
- Release dates: September 10, 2011 (TIFF); August 23, 2013 (United States)
- Running time: 94 minutes
- Country: United States
- Language: English
- Budget: $1 million
- Box office: $26.9 million

You're Next is a 2011 American slasher film directed and edited by Adam Wingard, written by Simon Barrett and starring Sharni Vinson, Nicholas Tucci, Wendy Glenn, A. J. Bowen, Joe Swanberg, Barbara Crampton, and Rob Moran. The plot concerns an estranged family under attack by a group of masked assailants during a family reunion.

Produced on a low budget, You're Next had its world premiere in the Midnight Madness section of the 2011 Toronto International Film Festival and was released theatrically on August 23, 2013, in the United States. The film grossed over $26 million from a $1 million production budget and has since gained a cult following.

== Plot ==
A couple, Talia and Erik Harson, have sex. After a shower, Erik finds the message "you're next" written on the window in Talia's blood, and her body lying dead on the ground. An intruder wearing a lamb mask kills Erik with a machete.

Erin accompanies her boyfriend, Crispian Davison, to a family dinner at their vacation home in rural Missouri. Present are Crispian's parents Aubrey and Paul, Crispian's older brother Drake and his wife Kelly, Crispian's younger brother Felix and his girlfriend Zee, and Crispian's younger sister Aimee and her boyfriend Tariq.

During dinner, an assailant in a tiger mask shoots crossbow bolts through the window, one of which hits and kills Tariq. The others try to contact the police, but discover that their cell phone reception has been jammed. Aimee runs outside to get help, but runs into a garrote wire, fatally slashing her throat. A distraught Aubrey retreats to her bedroom, but another intruder in a fox mask kills her with a machete before writing "you're next" in blood on the wall.

Kelly flees the house and goes to Erik's house nearby, where she finds his corpse. Lamb kills her by ramming an axe into the side of her head. Crispian leaves the house to look for help. Tiger attacks Erin but she stabs his arm, then smashes his kneecap and bludgeons him to death with a meat tenderizer.

Paul finds sleeping bags, food wrappers, and bottles of urine in the closet, indicating that the perpetrators have been hiding out in the house for some time. He presents this evidence to Felix and Zee, proclaiming that this was a targeted attack and not a random act of violence. Fox then approaches from behind and slits his throat. Felix and Zee emotionlessly watch him die, before Felix admonishes Fox for having killed his father right in front of him; the murderers are revealed as assassins hired by Felix and Zee to murder the family so the two could collect their inheritance. Meanwhile, Lamb finds Tiger's corpse and becomes enraged. He discovers a wounded Drake, but retreats after Erin stabs him in the back with a screwdriver. While setting up nail traps, Erin explains to Zee that she grew up in a survivalist compound, where she learned combat and survival skills, unaware Zee was one of the people responsible behind the event. While they are looking for tools to use as weapons, Felix reveals to Drake that Kelly has been killed. He then stabs Drake to death with several screwdrivers.

Erin is attacked by Fox and jumps through a window to escape, injuring her leg. She hides in the woods, but is chased back to the house by Lamb. She sneaks into the house and hides behind a curtain. Lamb, climbing through the window, is injured by one of the nail traps. Erin overhears an argument between Felix, Zee, Fox, and Lamb where Felix learns Lamb and Tiger were brothers, and revealing to Erin that Felix and Zee are behind the events. Her phone receives an alert stating that one of the emergency texts she was attempting to send to 911 has gone through. She ambushes Lamb before fatally stabbing him.

Realizing she cannot outrun Fox with a wounded leg, she sets a trap at the front door with Lamb’s axe, positioning it above the door to fall and kill anyone who opens it. Fox re-enters the house through the window, but is lured into the basement and killed with a log. Zee and Felix attempt to kill Erin themselves, but she kills Felix by pulverizing his head with a blender before impaling Zee in the top of the head with a knife. When Felix's cell phone rings, Erin answers the call without speaking. Believing he is speaking to Felix, Crispian reveals his involvement in the scheme. Erin confronts him when he returns. Crispian tells her that she was never meant to be targeted and attempts to bribe her into staying quiet. Disgusted that he would sacrifice his family for money, she kills him by stabbing him in the side of the neck and eye.

A police officer arrives and shoots Erin in the shoulder, having seen her kill Crispian. He enters the house, despite Erin's attempts to dissuade him and falls victim to the axe trap.

== Cast ==
- Sharni Vinson as Erin
- Nicholas Tucci as Felix Davison
- Wendy Glenn as Zee
- A. J. Bowen as Crispian Davison
- Joe Swanberg as Drake Davison
- Margaret Laney as Kelly Davison (credited as Sarah Myers)
- Amy Seimetz as Aimee Davison
- Ti West as Tariq
- Rob Moran as Paul Davison
- Barbara Crampton as Aubrey Davison
- L.C. Holt as Craig / Lamb Mask
- Lane Hughes as Tom / Fox Mask
- Simon Barrett as Dave / Tiger Mask
- Larry Fessenden as Erik Harson
- Kate Lyn Sheil as Talia
- Calvin Reeder as Officer Trubiano

== Production ==
=== Development ===
Barrett wrote the film after Wingard told him that he wanted to do a home invasion movie, noting that they were the only films that still truly frightened him.

From there, Barrett wrote a script inspired by Agatha Christie mysteries as well as a combination of screwball comedies and chamber mysteries. Barrett would later note that A Bay of Blood was probably in the back of his mind when writing the film, although he only realized this after the fact.

Wingard credited the film's humor to Barrett's sense of humor and cynicism. Some of the dinner conversations were improvised and based on real-life experiences the filmmakers had with family members.

=== Filming ===
The film was shot in 2011 at a mansion in Columbia, Missouri. Filming took place over four weeks, and shooting consisted mostly of night shoots filmed from 7 p.m. to 7 a.m.

== Release ==
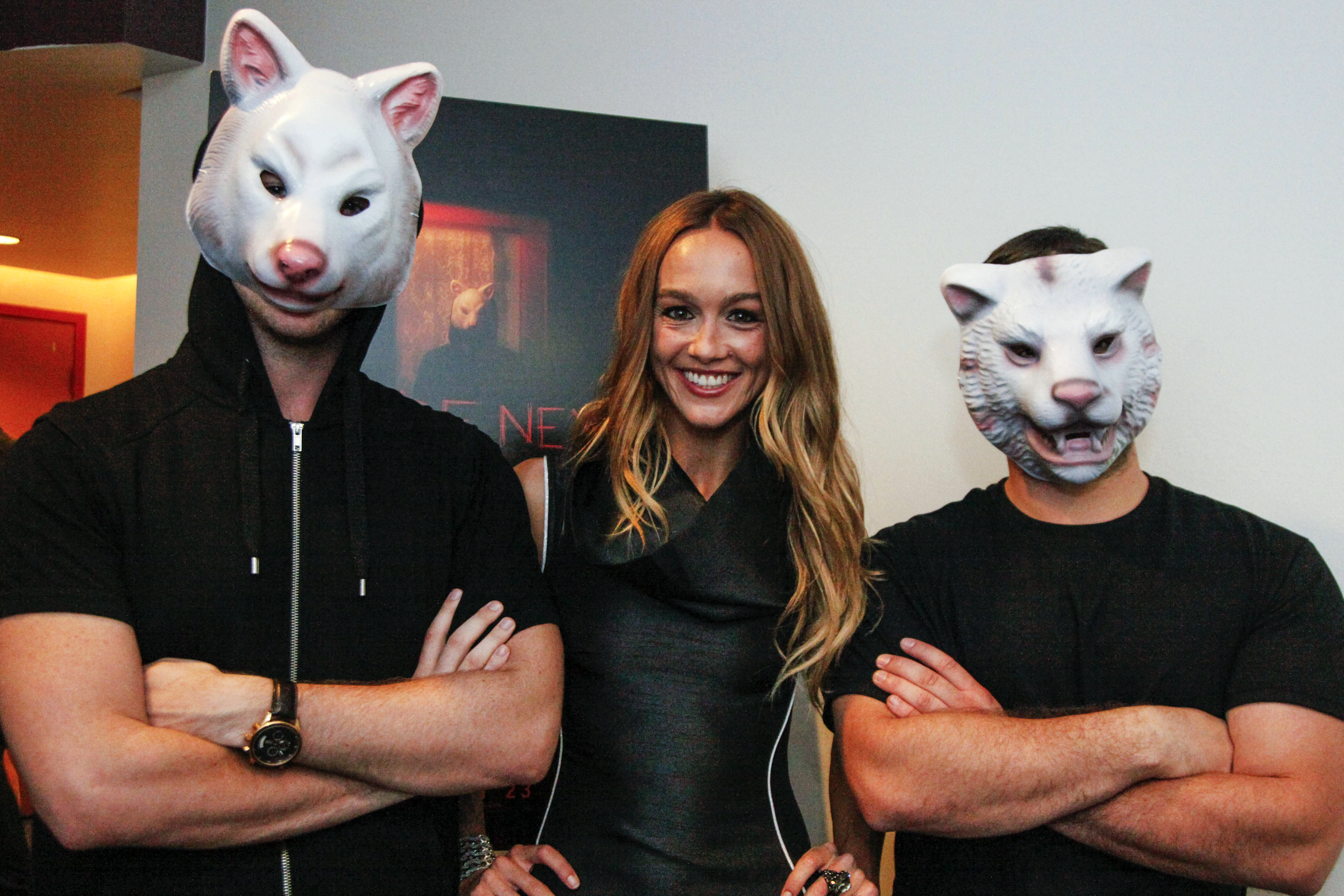
Sharni Vinson (center) alongside some fans.

You're Next premiered on September 17, 2011 at the 2011 Toronto International Film Festival and opened at other film festivals later.

Region	Release date	Festival
Canada	September 10, 2011	Toronto International Film Festival
United States	September 24, 2011	Fantastic Fest
France	September 4, 2013	World-wide release

Four days after its premiere, Lionsgate acquired American, British, and Canadian distribution rights to the film for $2 million. The film was part of the competition during the 20th edition of the international festival of fantastic movies at Gerardmer (France) in February 2013, and it won the Syfy prize of the event.

=== Box office ===
The film opened in the United States on August 23, 2013 and earned $7,020,196 in its opening weekend. The film closed on October 17, having grossed $18,494,006 in the domestic box office and $8,401,475 overseas for a worldwide total of $26,895,481.

=== Critical response ===
Rotten Tomatoes reports an approval rating of 79% based on 160 reviews, with an average rating of 6.6/10. The site's critical consensus states, "You're Next's energetic and effective mix of brutal gore and pitch black humor will please horror buffs and beyond." Metacritic gives the film a weighted average score of 66 out of 100, based on 32 critics, indicating "generally favorable reviews". Audiences polled by CinemaScore gave the film an average grade of "B−" on an A+ to F scale.

Vanity Fair's Jordan Hoffman called You're Next "one of the more entertaining horror pictures of the last 10 years". Chris Nashawaty of Entertainment Weekly gave the film a B+, praising "Wingard's canny knack for leavening his characters' gory demises with sick laughs and clever Rube Goldberg twists (razor-sharp piano wire hasn't been used this well since 1999's Audition). It's like Ordinary People meets Scream" and describing the final shot as "deliciously twisted". R. Kurt Osenlund of Slant Magazine gave the film 4 stars, stating that it "brazenly merges the home-invasion thriller with the dysfunctional family dramedy". Joshua Rothkopf (Time Out New York) called the film "solidly satisfying" and a "minor triumph", though adding that it was, in general, unoriginal. Matt Glasby of Total Film called the film "funny and tense, rather than hilarious and terrifying", and complimented it for being a "good" horror-comedy. Barbara VanDenburgh (Arizona Republic) gave the film 3.5 out of 5 stars, stating that it was not "very scary" and that its "budget for red food coloring was no doubt higher than the one for script doctoring"; although she complimented the score and "gruesome" conclusion. Mark Jenkins of The Washington Post said the movie "is at times bloodily entertaining. And if the central plot twist isn't all that clever, at least the movie offers some motivation for its mayhem", while Jane Horwitz wrote for the same newspaper: "For slasher/horror fans 17 and older, You're Next may provide sufficient homicidal entertainment". Liam Lacey (The Globe and Mail) gave the film 2.5 out of 4 stars, describing it as "well-executed" but "rudimentary".

A review from St. Louis Post-Dispatch called the film unoriginal, while Rene Rodriguez (The Miami Herald) panned the film, calling it "practically insulting", and dubbed the premise "idiotic". John DeFore (The Hollywood Reporter) wrote that the film's characters were mostly unsympathetic and that more humor would have improved the film. Stephen Whitty of The Newark Star-Ledger, in a review for The Portland Oregonian, gave the film a C+ rating, agreeing it was unoriginal and uninventive, comparing it to The Purge and The Last House on the Left. Scott Bowles of USA Today gave You're Next a negative review, describing it as repetitive and stating that it did not have a purpose.

Total Film placed Erin (Sharni Vinson) at number one on their list of "50 Most Bad-Ass Female Horror Leads". Entertainment Weekly placed Erin at number thirteen on its list of "The Best Horror Heroines in Film."

=== Home media ===
The film was released via video on demand on December 27, 2013, and via DVD and Blu-ray on January 14, 2014.

== Related films ==
In July of 2026 after previously being referred to as a "spiritual sequel", writer/director Adam Wingard announced that Onslaught takes place within the same continuity as The Guest. Elaborating further that the character David Collins from The Guest was a part of the same organization that the 2026 movie depicts, the filmmaker noted that he considers You're Next to be a part of a trilogy in the same continuity.

The connections were later clarified through the fictional secret security detail entity, referred to as the KPG. Initially referenced in You're Next by the main characters, the operating functions of establishment were explored in greater detail during The Guest through its lead super-soldier character named David Collins. Portrayed by Dan Stevens, the plot includes actions enforced by the KPG to hinder David's actions, who the company views as the recovery of a secret asset who has gone rogue. In Onslaught the company is explored further through the evolution of their super-soldier program. In the third installment, Stevens plays a powerful figure named Dr. Hans Klammer who works for Priapus which is depicted as a branch of the same organization. Depicted as the descendant of a Nazi scientist, Klammer furthers the KPG experimentations.

After explaining that KPG is an acronym which the franchise has so far revealed stands for Klammer Priapus G., Wingard confirmed plans to provide the audience with its full name; while stating that future installments in the franchise will explore the relationship of the Collins and Klammer characters. Stevens similarly confirmed that internal discussions regarding the final scenes of Onslaught setting up the future of the franchise.

== See also ==
- List of films featuring home invasions
