= Kaylee Hottle =

American actress (2008–2026)

- Hottle in 2021
- Born: Kaylee Beth Hottle; March 17, 2008; Atlanta, Georgia, U.S.
- Died: July 21, 2026 (aged 18); Ijamsville, Maryland, U.S.
- Burial place: Kyle, Texas, U.S.
- Occupation: Actress
- Years active: 2017–2026

Kaylee Beth Hottle (March 17, 2008 – July 21, 2026) was a deaf American actress who starred in the monster film Godzilla vs. Kong (2021) and its sequel, Godzilla x Kong: The New Empire (2024). For the latter, she was nominated for the Saturn Award for Best Performance by a Younger Actor.

== Early life ==
Kaylee Beth Hottle was born on March 17, 2008, in Atlanta, Georgia, to an all-deaf family, with her father's side having four generations of deaf relatives. She was fluent in American Sign Language (ASL). She was of Korean descent through her mother. She attended the Texas School for the Deaf in Austin, Texas, where she competed in track and field.

== Career ==
Hottle began her career with commercials. In 2017, at age nine, she appeared in a commercial for the video relay service Convo. She also appeared in other commercials, as well as the informational project 10 Deaf Children: One Powerful Message, aimed at promoting support for the Deaf community in their pursuit of equal rights.

For the 2021 film Godzilla vs. Kong, casting director Sarah Halley Finn looked for a deaf actress for the deaf character Jia through a network of casting directors and theaters, and was guided to Hottle by an assistant director from the earlier film Kong: Skull Island (2017) who had seen her in a Convo commercial. The film was Hottle's feature-film debut, in which her character uses American Sign Language to communicate with the giant gorilla Kong. Starring actors Rebecca Hall and Alexander Skarsgård learned ASL so they and Hottle could communicate on set when not acting. Also in 2021, she appeared in an episode of the action television series Magnum P.I.

Hottle reprised her role as Jia for the 2024 film Godzilla x Kong: The New Empire, for which she was nominated for the Saturn Award for Best Performance by a Younger Actor at the 52nd Saturn Awards.

Before her death in 2026, Hottle had been set to star in the film What Doesn't Kill Us, with her older sister stepping in to play the role.

== Death ==
In the early morning of July 21, 2026, Hottle sustained injuries in a single-vehicle collision in Ijamsville, Maryland. She was one of three occupants in a vehicle that veered off the road and struck a culvert. Deputies responded at 2:52 AM; the driver suffered non-life-threatening injuries, while the other passenger declined help. Police said that excessive speed was believed to be a factor. Hottle was airlifted by Maryland State Police to R Adams Cowley Shock Trauma Center, where she was pronounced dead. Her father announced her death in a Facebook video statement. The following day, Hottle's cause of death was confirmed as multiple blunt-force trauma, and her manner of death was ruled an accident.

Former co-stars Rebecca Hall, Dan Stevens, and Millie Bobby Brown paid tribute to Hottle on social media, as did actress, author, and deaf advocate Marlee Matlin. Legendary Entertainment, the film company that produced the Monsterverse films Hottle starred in, left a tribute on social media, and Royal National Institute for Deaf People associate director Teri Devine described Hottle as a "passionate advocate for the deaf community and deaf actors in Hollywood".

Hottle was interred in an unidentified cemetery in Kyle, Texas, following a memorial service at the Texas School for the Deaf on August 3.

== Credits ==
Year	Title	Medium	Role	Notes
2021	Godzilla vs. Kong	Film	Jia	
2021	Magnum P.I.	Television series	Joon	Episode: "Texas Wedge"
2024	Godzilla x Kong: The New Empire	Film	Jia	
