= Night Sky (film) =

- Directed by: Jacob Gentry
- Written by: Jacob Gentry; A. J. Bowen
- Produced by: Jacob Gentry; Michael Jasionowski
- Starring: A. J. Bowen; Brea Grant; Scott Poythress; Sandra Benton; Adam Voss
- Cinematography: Jacob Gentry
- Edited by: Jacob Gentry; Michael Jasionowski
- Music by: Ben Lovett
- Production companies: POP Films; Inkshot Pictures
- Release date: 26 August 2022 (FrightFest)
- Running time: 96 minutes
- Country: United States
- Language: English

Night Sky is a 2022 American science fiction thriller film directed by Jacob Gentry, starring A. J. Bowen, Brea Grant and Scott Poythress.

== Cast ==
- A. J. Bowen as Oren
- Brea Grant as Annie
- Scott Poythress
- Sandra Benton
- Adam Voss

== Release ==
The film premiered at FrightFest on 26 August 2022.

== Reception ==
David Gelmini of Dread Central rated the film 4.5 stars out of 5 and called it "surprisingly moving and human".

Anton Bitel of SciFiNow rated the film 4 stars out of 5 and wrote that it is "all at once road movie, close encounter and lost soul’s bumpy journey towards death."

Film critic Kim Newman wrote that the film is a "relationship movie between hard-hearted human and open-minded alien, in which both players learn a lot from the other and the experience of being on the road together – but also a meditation on the horrors crowding in on decent people in the contemporary world."
