= Snowfort Pictures =

Founded in 2010 by Travis Stevens, Snowfort Pictures is a boutique film production company specializing in the development, financing and production of commercial genre films.

The company's first production was Adam Wingard's A Horrible Way To Die which premiered at the 2010 Toronto International Film Festival and was immediately picked up for theatrical distribution by Anchor Bay Entertainment. The film won jury awards for Best Actor (AJ Bowen), Best Actress (Amy Seimetz) and Best Screenplay (Simon Barrett) at the 2010 Fantastic Fest and went on to play numerous festivals around the world.

Additional Snowfort productions include Adam Wingard's "What Fun We Were Having: 4 Stories About Date Rape" that premiered at the 2011 Fantasia Film Festival, the 2011 Tribeca Film Festival and AFI Film Fest entry "All In All", The Butcher Brothers "The Thompsons" (an international co-production with Lionsgate UK), Frank Pavich's 2013 Cannes Film Festival entry Jodorowsky's Dune (an international co-production with Koch Media in Germany and Camera One in France), SXSW 2012 hit The Aggression Scale from director Steven C. Miller, the SXSW 2013 hit Big Ass Spider! from director Mike Mendez, the SXSW 2013 Audience Award Winner, 2013 Boston Underground Film Festival Director's Choice Award Winner "Cheap Thrills" from director E.L. Katz, Ravi Dhar's arthouse action film "American Muscle", the Hollywood Cult tale Starry Eyes from directors Dennis Widmyer and Kevin Kolsch (a co-production with MPI/Dark Sky Films), and 2015 SXSW breakout We Are Still Here from writer/director Ted Geoghegan.

Other collaborations with female filmmakers such as Karyn Kusama (XX), Sarah Adina Smith (Buster's Mal Heart), and Bethany Brooke Anderson Burning Kentucky) have found critical and commercial success around the world.

== Filmography ==
- Mohawk (2017)
- 68 Kill (2017)
- XX (2017)
- 24x36: A Movie About Posters (2016)
- Buster's Mal Heart (2016)
- Teenage Cocktail (2016)
- Trash Fire (2016)
- We Are Still Here (2015)
- Starry Eyes (2014)
- Cheap Thrills (2013)
- Jodorowsky's Dune (2013)
- American Muscle (2014)
- Big Ass Spider (2013)
- The Aggression Scale (2012)
- The Thompsons (2012)
- A Horrible Way to Die (2010)
