= Dan Stevens =

English actor (born 1982)

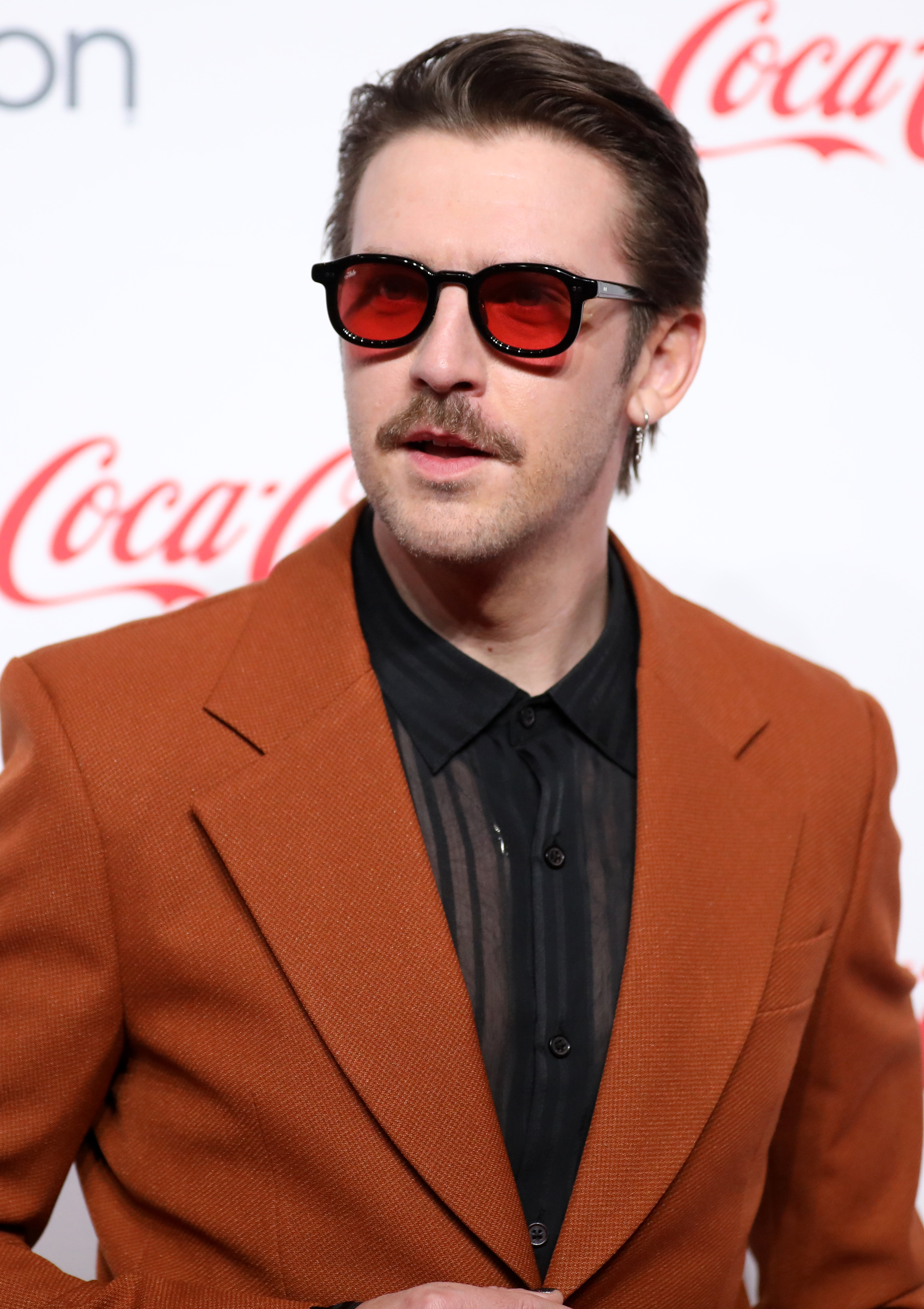
- Stevens in 2024
- Born: Daniel Jonathan Stevens; 10 October 1982 (age 44); London, England
- Education: University of Cambridge (BA)
- Occupation: Actor
- Years active: 1999–present
- Spouse: Susie Hariet (m. 2009)
- Children: 3

Daniel Jonathan Stevens (born 10 October 1982) is an English actor. He first drew international attention for his role as Matthew Crawley in the ITV period drama series Downton Abbey (2010–2012). He also portrayed and voiced The Beast in Disney's live action adaptation of Beauty and the Beast (2017), and starred as David Haller in the Noah Hawley-created FX psychological thriller series Legion (2017–2019), for which he received critical praise for his performance.

He has also had starring roles in various feature films including The Guest (2014), Night at the Museum: Secret of the Tomb (2014), Marshall (2017), The Man Who Invented Christmas (2017), Apostle (2018), The Rental (2020), Eurovision Song Contest: The Story of Fire Saga (2020), Godzilla x Kong: The New Empire (2024), Cuckoo (2024), and The Ritual (2025).

== Early life ==
Stevens was adopted at birth by parents who were both teachers, and grew up in Wales and southeast England. He has a younger brother, who was adopted from different biological parents. Stevens boarded on a scholarship at Tonbridge School, a private school in Kent. There he became interested in drama after auditioning for the title role in Macbeth with his teacher, novelist Jonathan Smith. From the age of 15, he spent his summers training and performing with the National Youth Theatre in London.

Stevens studied English Literature at Emmanuel College, Cambridge. While at Cambridge, he was a member of the Footlights with Stefan Golaszewski, Tim Key and Mark Watson, and was also active in the Marlowe Society. He was first spotted by director Peter Hall at a Marlowe Society production of Macbeth, in which he played the title character alongside Hall's daughter, Rebecca Hall.

== Career ==
In 2004, Stevens began his professional acting career when Peter Hall cast him as Orlando in his touring production of Shakespeare's As You Like It. The tour took the production to the Rose Theatre in Kingston upon Thames, the Brooklyn Academy of Music in New York City, the Curran Theatre in San Francisco, and the Ahmanson Theatre in Los Angeles. His debut performance earned him glowing reviews from prominent critics in Britain and the United States, as well as a commendation at the 2004 Ian Charleson Awards.

In 2006, Stevens starred as Nick Guest in the BBC adaptation of Alan Hollinghurst's Man Booker Prize-winning novel The Line of Beauty. Later that year, he played Simon Bliss in Hay Fever by Noël Coward at London's Haymarket Theatre, alongside Peter Bowles and Dame Judi Dench; the director was Peter Hall. He also performed as Lord Holmwood in an adaptation of Dracula for the BBC, and as Basil Brookes in the BBC Emmy Award–winning film, Maxwell. That same year, he was named one of Screen International's 2006 Stars Of Tomorrow.

In 2008, Stevens appeared in the BBC adaptation of Jane Austen's novel, Sense & Sensibility, playing Edward Ferrars, and the West End revival of Noël Coward's The Vortex. In January 2009, he appeared on New Year's Day in Agatha Christie's Marple: Nemesis on ITV1 in Britain. He also appeared in an adaptation of The Turn of the Screw featuring future Downton Abbey costar Michelle Dockery. In June 2009, he returned to the West End, playing Septimus Hodge in an acclaimed revival of Tom Stoppard's Arcadia at the Duke of York's Theatre.

In 2010, Stevens got his biggest break when he was cast as Matthew Crawley in the ITV series Downton Abbey, created and written by Oscar-winning screenwriter Julian Fellowes. The series went on to be a global sensation and has been nominated for several Emmy, BAFTA, Golden Globe and Screen Actors Guild Awards. The central love story of Matthew Crawley and his distant cousin, Lady Mary Crawley, played by Michelle Dockery, was enormously popular. Determined to move on with his career, Stevens chose to leave the series after finishing the third season and the Christmas Special in 2012. His exit caused a huge uproar with fans, who took to Twitter and other social media sites to express their anger at the character's death.

In November 2011, Stevens guest-hosted an episode of Have I Got News for You. In March 2012, he completed shooting Vamps, from Amy Heckerling, and Summer in February, an Edwardian romance film set in an artist colony. Also in 2012, Stevens moved with his family to New York City, when he made his Broadway debut that year opposite Jessica Chastain and David Strathairn in The Heiress.

In 2014, Stevens starred in the independent film The Guest, winning critical acclaim for his portrayal of a recently discharged army veteran who goes on a killing spree to protect his true identity. He earned a Saturn Award for Best Actor nomination for his performance. Also in 2014, he appeared in the magic realism comedy-drama film The Cobbler with Adam Sandler and Dustin Hoffman, and in the dark action film A Walk Among the Tombstones with Liam Neeson. He played a simulacrum of Sir Lancelot in the 2014 comedy film Night at the Museum: Secret of the Tomb with Ben Stiller, Robin Williams, Owen Wilson and Rami Malek.

In February 2016, Stevens was cast in the lead role of David Charles Haller in the FX series Legion, an X-Men-related drama created by Noah Hawley and he also starred alongside Anne Hathaway and Jason Sudeikis, giving life to Tim, Gloria's ex-boyfriend, in Colossal. The first season began airing in February 2017 and received critical acclaim; a second season aired the next year, and was renewed for a third season in June 2018.

In 2017, Stevens played the titular role of the Beast, opposite Emma Watson as Belle, in Disney's live-action adaptation of Beauty and the Beast, directed by Bill Condon. The cast was also accompanied by Luke Evans, Ewan McGregor, Emma Thompson, Ian McKellen, Kevin Kline, Stanley Tucci and Josh Gad. The film was released in March 2017 to positive reviews, and earned over $1.2 billion in worldwide box office revenue, making it the highest-grossing live-action musical film, the second highest-grossing film of 2017, and the 17th highest-grossing film of all time. At the same year, he appeared in Marshall with Chadwick Boseman, Josh Gad and Kate Hudson, and The Man Who Invented Christmas, directed by Bharat Nalluri, and co-starring Christopher Plummer and Jonathan Pryce.

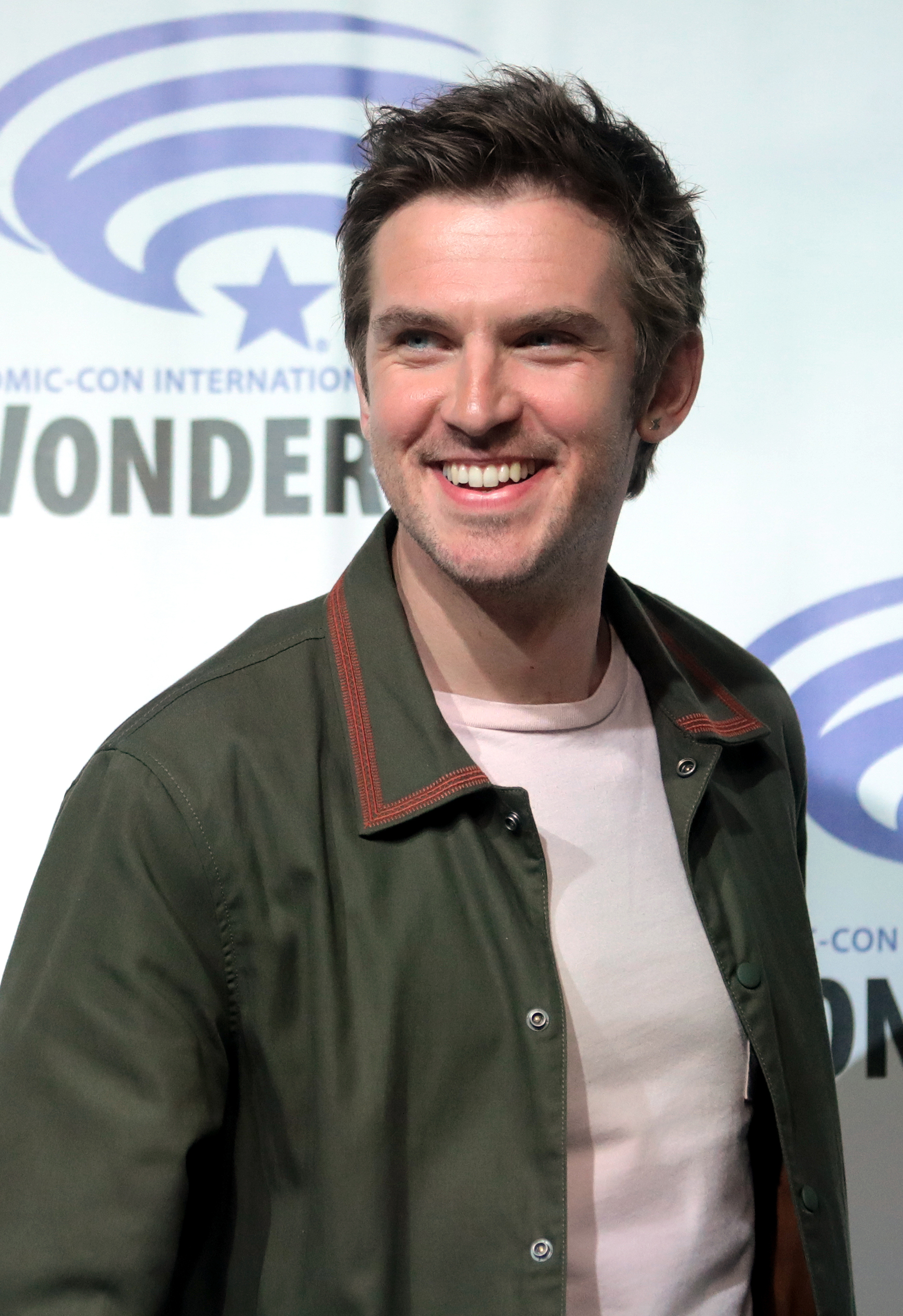
Stevens at the 2019 WonderCon promoting Legion

In 2018, Stevens starred in the Netflix thriller film Apostle, directed by Gareth Huw Evans. In 2019, Stevens co-starred in the drama Lucy in the Sky, released in September 2019. It co-stars Natalie Portman and Jon Hamm, and is directed by Legion creator, Noah Hawley.

In 2020, Stevens co-starred alongside Harrison Ford in The Call of the Wild, released on 21 February 2020. The film is based on the American classic novel by Jack London. He also returned to Broadway to star in Martin McDonagh's dark comedy Hangmen. The Atlantic Theater Company production co-starred Mark Addy and Ewen Bremner. Stevens played the pivotal role of Mooney. The production was to have a 20-week limited engagement at the Golden Theatre in Manhattan. Previews began on 29 February, however the production's run was suspended on 11 March, before it had officially opened, due to the COVID-19 pandemic. On 20 March the producers announced with regret that the production was closed permanently. All Broadway theatres were shut down soon afterwards. The same year, he appears as an "absurdly lascivious" Russian crooner in the Netflix musical comedy film Eurovision Song Contest: The Story of Fire Saga, co-starring with Will Ferrell and Rachel McAdams.

In 2021, Stevens played a robot in the German language sci-fi romance I'm Your Man.

In 2022, Stevens voiced the villain Admiral Hornagold in the animated movie The Sea Beast, which premiered on Netflix.

In 2024, Stevens starred in the horror film Cuckoo with Hunter Schafer, Marton Csokas and Jessica Henwick. That same year he also played a leading role as the veterinarian Trapper Beasley in Godzilla x Kong: The New Empire with Rebecca Hall and Brian Tyree Henry, directed by Adam Wingard. Stevens also appeared as Frank, a corrupt ex-police detective in Abigail with Melissa Barrera.

In 2025, Stevens starred in the biographical drama Swiped with Lily James, the horror film The Ritual with Al Pacino, and the third season of AMC's The Terror, as lead actor and executive producer. He also appeared in the Netflix series Zero Day as political commentator Evan Green, starring alongside Robert De Niro, Lizzy Caplan and Jesse Plemons.

In April 2026, Stevens was cast in the Dexter sequel series, Dexter: Resurrection, portraying serial killer Owen Stark / The Five Borough Killer. In August, Stevens was cast as RoboCop/Alex Murphy in the upcoming Amazon Prime Video series.

In 2027, he will reprise the role of Trapper Beasley in Godzilla x Kong: Supernova, with new cast members Jack O'Connell, Sam Neill, Alycia Debnam-Carey and Matthew Modine. On October 29, 2025, he was cast in the film Hey Bear alongside Mia Goth and Zach Galifianakis. Later, on November 3, 2025, it was announced that Stevens had joined the cast of the film Babies alongside Seth Rogen, Zach Cherry, Kate Berlant, Issa Rae, Ed Helms, Sharon Stone and David Strathairn.

=== Other work ===
Stevens has narrated over 30 audiobooks, including Casino Royale, Wolf Hall and War Horse. In 2014, he was nominated for two Audie Awards, in the Classic category and Solo Narration (Male) category for Frankenstein. In 2026, Stevens voiced Monsieur Andre in Erin A. Craig's audiobook Our Strange Duet (2026), a new reimagining and followup to Andrew Lloyd Webber's musical The Phantom of the Opera.

Outside acting, Stevens maintains an interest in writing and literature and is editor-at-large for The Junket, an online quarterly that he co-founded in 2011 with some friends. He was a member of the judging panel for the 2012 Man Booker Prize, and was a regular columnist for the Sunday Telegraph.

A cricket enthusiast, he played for the Authors XI team, which is composed of a number of prominent British writers, in 2012. He also contributed a chapter to the team's book The Authors XI: A Season of English Cricket from Hackney to Hambledon, which was shortlisted for the 2014 Cricket Society and M.C.C. Book of the Year Award.

== Personal life ==
In 2009, Stevens married South African jazz singer and singing teacher Susie Hariet. They have three children.

== Filmography ==
=== Film ===
Key
†	Denotes films that have not yet been released

Year	Title	Role	Notes
2009	Hilde	David Cameron	
2011	The North London Book of the Dead	Speaker	Short film
2011	Babysitting	Spencer	Short film
2012	Vamps	Joey Van Helsing	
2012	Shallow	Richard Dove	Short film
2013	Summer in February	Gilbert Evans	Also executive producer
2013	The Fifth Estate	Ian Katz	
2014	The Guest	David Collins	
2014	A Walk Among the Tombstones	Kenny Kristo	
2014	The Cobbler	Emiliano	
2014	Night at the Museum: Secret of the Tomb	Lancelot	
2015	Criminal Activities	Noah	
2016	The Ticket	James	
2016	Norman	Bill Kavish	
2016	Colossal	Tim	
2017	Beauty and the Beast	Beast	Also voice
2017	Permission	Will	
2017	Kill Switch	Will Porter	
2017	Marshall	Lorin Willis	
2017	The Man Who Invented Christmas	Charles Dickens	
2018	Her Smell	'Dirtbag' Danny	
2018	Apostle	Thomas Richardson	
2019	Lucy in the Sky	Drew Cola	Directed by Legion creator Noah Hawley
2020	The Call of the Wild	Hal	
2020	The Rental	Charlie	
2020	Eurovision Song Contest: The Story of Fire Saga	Alexander Lemtov	
2020	Blithe Spirit	Charles Condomine	
2021	Earwig and the Witch	Thomas (voice)	English dub
2021	I'm Your Man	Tom	
2022	The Sea Beast	Admiral Hornagold (voice)	
2023	The Boy and the Heron	Parakeet (voice)	English dub
2024	Cuckoo	Herr König	
2024	Godzilla x Kong: The New Empire	Travis "Trapper" Beasley	
2024	Abigail	Frank	
2025	The Ritual	Father Joseph Steiger	
2025	Swiped	Andrey Andreev	
2026	Onslaught	Hans Kammler	
2026	Babies	Luke	
2026	Hexed †	Hieronymous (voice)	
2027	Godzilla x Kong: Supernova †	Travis "Trapper" Beasley	Post-production

=== Television ===
Key
†	Denotes television productions that have not yet been released

Year	Title	Role	Notes
2004	Frankenstein	Henry Clerval	2 episodes
2006	The Line of Beauty	Nick Guest	3 episodes
2006	Dracula	Lord Arthur Holmwood	Television film
2007	Maxwell	Basil Brookes	Television film
2007	Agatha Christie's Marple	Michael Rafiel	Episode: "Nemesis"
2008	Sense and Sensibility	Edward Ferrars	3 episodes
2009	The Turn of the Screw	Dr. Fisher	Television film
2010	To Nisi	Ed	Episode: "Pilot"
2010–2012	Downton Abbey	Matthew Crawley	25 episodes
2012	The Making of Planet Earth	Narrator	Documentary
2012	Forget Me Not	Narrator	Documentary
2013	The Tomorrow People	TIM	Voice, 3 episodes; uncredited
2014	Once Upon a Time: Wicked Is Coming	Narrator	Television special
2014–2020	High Maintenance	Colin	4 episodes
2015–2016	SuperMansion	Bunsen	Voice, 2 episodes
2017–2019	Legion	David Haller / Legion	27 episodes
2018	I Love You, America with Sarah Silverman	James A. Garfield	Episode: "Bernie Sanders"
2020	Kipo and the Age of Wonderbeasts	Scarlemagne, Hugo Oak	Voice, 20 episodes
2021	Solos	Otto / Tym	2 episodes
2021	The Prince	King Charles III, Prince Philip	Voice, 12 episodes
2022	Central Park	Bitsy's Father	Voice, 2 episodes
2022	Gaslit	John Dean	Miniseries, 8 episodes
2022	Guillermo del Toro's Cabinet of Curiosities	Alo Glo Man	Episode: "The Outside"
2022	Welcome to Chippendales	Paul Snider	Miniseries, 1 episode
2022, 2025	Love, Death & Robots	Nigel, Technician, Satan	Voice, 3 episodes
2023–2025	Solar Opposites	Korvotron "Korvo" Opposites	Main voice role; season 4–6; Nominated—Annie Award for Best Voice Acting – TV/Media
2025	Zero Day	Evan Green	Miniseries, 4 episodes
2025	Bad Thoughts	Allain Fletcher, Gary Crawford	2 episodes
2025	LEGO Star Wars: Rebuild the Galaxy: Pieces of the Past	Solitus	Voice, 4 episodes
2025	The American Revolution	Voice of General William Howe and Comte de Rochambeau	Ken Burns documentary series, voice role
2026	The Terror: Devil in Silver	Pepper	Main Role
2026	Among Us	Blue	Voice
TBA	Dexter: Resurrection †	Owen Stark / the Five Borough Killer	Main role (season 2)
TBA	Legacy of Spies †	Bill Haydon	Filming

== Other works ==
=== Stage ===
Year	Title	Role	Venue	Notes
2004	As You Like It	Orlando	Rose Theatre	London revival Nominated – Ian Charleson Award
2005	Much Ado About Nothing	Claudio	Theatre Royal	Regional revival
2006	The Romans in Britain	Marban / Maitland	Crucible Theatre	Regional revival
2006	Hay Fever	Simon Bliss	Haymarket Theatre	West End revival
2008	The Vortex	Nicky Lancaster	Apollo Theatre	West End revival
2009	Every Good Boy Deserves Favour	The Doctor	Royal National Theatre	National Theatre revival
2009	Arcadia	Septimus Hodge	Duke of York's Theatre	West End revival
2012	The Heiress	Morris Townsend	Walter Kerr Theatre	Broadway revival
2020	Hangmen	Mooney	John Golden Theatre	Broadway production

=== Audiobook narrator ===
Year	Title	Notes
2007	The Dragon's Eye	
2007	Die with Me	
2007	Strike Back	
2008	Day	
2008	The Outcast	
2009	The Dragon Diary: Dragonology Chronicles, Vol. 2	
2009	The Angel's Game	
2009	A Week in December	
2009	Wolf Hall	
2010	War Horse	
2010	Blueeyedboy	
2010	The Prince of Mist	
2010	Young Sherlock Holmes: Death Cloud	
2010	Fall of Giants	
2010	Young Sherlock Holmes: Red Leech	
2011	My Dear, I Wanted to Tell You	Galaxy National Book Award for Audiobook of the Year
2011	The Midnight Palace	
2011	The History of a Pleasure Seeker	
2011	The Invisible Ones	
2012	The Time Keeper	
2012	Casino Royale	Nominated—Specsavers National Book Award for Audiobook of the Year
2013	Letters from Everest: A First-Hand Account of the Epic First Ascent	
2013	Going Solo	
2013	Boy	
2013	Frankenstein	Nominated—Audie Awards, Classic & Solo Narration – Male
2014	Letters to a Young Poet	
2014	Murder on the Orient Express	
2014	And Then There Were None	
2014	The Heroes' Welcome	
2014	Scorpia Rising	
2014	Snakehead	
2014	Crocodile Tears	
2014	The Iliad	
2014	The Odyssey	Nominated—Audie Award, Classic

=== Radio and audio drama ===
Year	Title	Role	Notes
2006	A Question of Attribution	Phillips	BBC Radio 4
2008	The Tennis Court	Sam Greenwood	BBC Radio 4
2008	Dickens Confidential (series 2)	Charles Dickens	BBC Radio 4
2008	Anthem for Doomed Youth	Narrator	BBC Armistice exhibition
2008	The Josephine Hart Poetry Hour (episode 1)	Narrator	BBC Radio 4
2008–2009	Orley Farm	Peregrine Orm	BBC Radio 4
2009	The Lady of the Camellias	Duval	BBC Radio 4
2009	Guilty Until Proven Innocent	Jake	BBC Radio 4
2009	The Music Room	Narrator	BBC Radio 4
2010	The Custom of the Country	Ralph Marvell	BBC Radio 4
2010	The Secret Pilgrim (episode 1)	Ben Cavendish	BBC Radio 4
2010	The Coral Thief	Narrator	BBC Radio 4
2010	The Story of the Siren – E.M. Forster Short Stories	Narrator	BBC Radio 4
2010	The Cradle of the Snake	Rick ausGarten	Big Finish, Doctor Who story
2011	A Thousand Kisses	Catullus	BBC Radio 3
2011	Widowers' Houses	Harry Trench	BBC Radio 3
2011	Portrait of Winston	Graham Sutherland	BBC Radio 4
2011	King James Bible	Narrator	BBC Radio 4
2011	A Short History of Vampires – Dracula's Guest	Bram Stoker	BBC Radio 7
2011	Words & Music – Money	Narrator	BBC Radio 3
2011	Together – Face It	Narrator	BBC Radio 4
2011	The Spying Game Series – The Living Daylights	Narrator	BBC Radio 4
2011	Something Understood	Reader	BBC Radio 4
2012	The Old Ways	Reader	BBC Radio 4

=== Podcasts ===
Year	Title	Role	Notes
2020	Flight 008, Iterations: Seat 13F	Malcolm	DUST

== Awards and nominations ==
Awards and nominations received by Dan Stevens
Award	Year (Note: Indicates the year of ceremony)	Category	Nominated work	Result	Ref(s)
Annie Awards	2024	Outstanding Achievement for Voice Acting in an Animated Television/Media Production	Solar Opposites	Nominated	
Critics Choice Super Awards	2021	Best Actor in a Horror Movie	The Rental	Nominated	
Detroit Film Critics Society Awards	2014	Breakthrough Artist	The Guest	Nominated	
Empire Awards	2015	Best Male Newcomer	The Guest	Nominated	
Empire Awards	2018	Best Actor in a TV Series	Legion	Nominated	
Fangoria Chainsaw Awards	2024	Best Supporting Performance	Abigail	Nominated	
Fangoria Chainsaw Awards	2025	Best Supporting Performance	Cuckoo	Nominated	
German Film Awards	2021	Best Performance by an Actor in a Leading Role	I'm Your Man	Nominated	
Golden Schomes Awards	2014	Breakthrough Performance of the Year	The Guest	Nominated	
Hollywood Creative Alliance	2017	Best Visual Effects or Animated Performance	Beauty and the Beast	Nominated	
Hollywood Creative Alliance	2022	Best Supporting Actor in a Broadcast Network or Cable Limited Series, Anthology Series, or Movie	Gaslit	Nominated	
IGN Summer Movie Awards	2017	Best Dramatic TV Performance	Legion	Nominated	
Indiana Film Journalists Association	2020	Best Supporting Actor	Eurovision Song Contest	Nominated	
Monte Carlo TV Festival Awards	2012	Outstanding Actor in a Drama Series	Downton Abbey	Nominated	
MTV Movie and TV Awards	2017	Best Kiss (shared with Emma Watson)	Beauty and the Beast	Nominated	
Saturn Awards	2015	Best Actor	The Guest	Nominated	
Screen Actors Guild Awards	2013	Best Performance by an Ensemble in a Drama Series	Downton Abbey	Nominated	
Screen Actors Guild Awards	2014	Best Performance by an Ensemble in a Drama Series	Downton Abbey	Nominated	
Washington DC Area Film Critics Association	2021	Best Motion Capture Performance	Beauty and the Beast	Nominated	
