= A. J. Bowen =

American actor (born 1977)

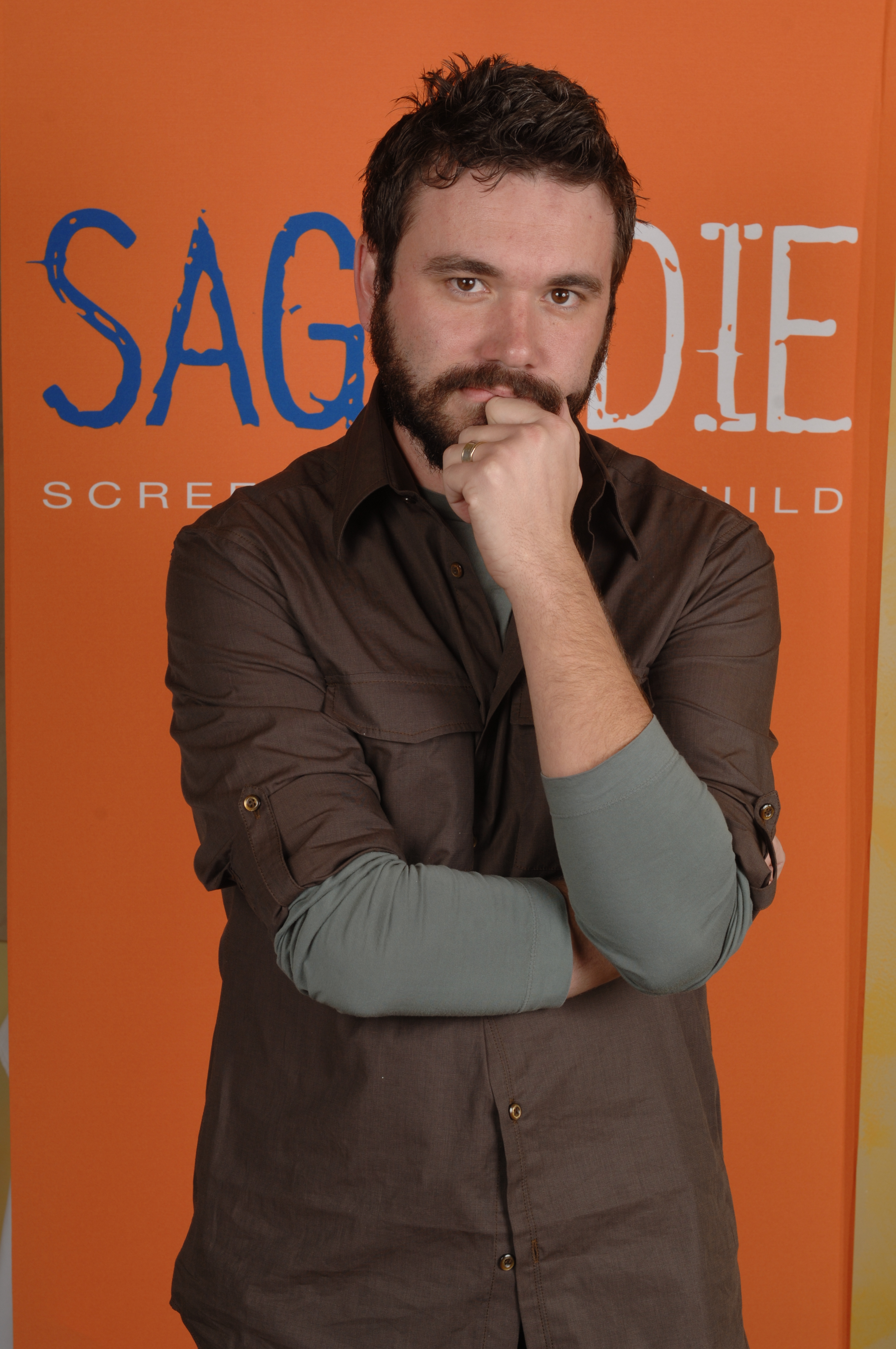
- Bowen at the 2007 Sundance Film Festival
- Born: Alfred Charles Bowen Jr. December 21, 1977 (age 48); Marietta, Georgia, U.S.
- Occupations: Actor; film producer
- Years active: 2003–present

Alfred Charles "A. J." Bowen Jr. (born December 21, 1977) is an American actor and producer. He starred in The Signal (2007) and A Horrible Way to Die (2010).

== Early life ==
Bowen was born in Marietta, Georgia, and attended the University of Georgia along with Jacob Gentry and David Bruckner. He was initially a musician.

== Career ==
LA Weekly called Bowen "mumblegore's go-to star". He starred in The Signal (2007) and The House of the Devil (2009). The first feature from his production company, Normaltown, was Maidenhead, in which he stars. He also starred in Hatchet II (2010). He was part of the Christmas episode of Dread Central's Dinner for Friends ("Shark Alarm 2009", the holiday edition of the site's podcast). He also starred in the thriller film Rites of Spring. He starred in the science fiction film Synchronicity. He co-starred in the film You're Next (2011) and appeared in The Reconstruction of William Zero (2014).

== Filmography ==
Year	Title	Role
2003	Gnome	
2003	Good Friday	
2004	Last Goodbye	Gabriel
2006	Gnome 2	
2006	Creepshow III	Jerry
2007	The Signal	Lewis Denton
2008	The Season	Hank
2008	Maidenhead	Martin
2009	The House of the Devil	Victor Ulman
2010	A Horrible Way to Die	Garrick Turrell
2010	Hatchet II	Layton
2011	You're Next	Crispian
2011	What Fun We Were Having	
2011	Rites of Spring	Ben Geringer
2011	Chillerama	Rick Marshall
2013	The Sacrament	Sam
2013	Twisted Tales	Fred
2013	Grow Up, Tony Phillips	Pete
2014	Faults	Man in Audience
2014	The Reconstruction of William Zero	Mr. Bragg
2014	The Guest	Austin
2015	Synchronicity	Chuck
2016	Teenage Cocktail	Joseph Damone
2016	Sun Don't Shine	Highway Angel
2018	Dead Night	James Pollack
2019	Satanic Panic	Duncan
2019	I Trapped the Devil	Matt
2020	The Old Ways	Carson
2021	Night Drive	Russell
2021	Edge of Insanity	Doctor Freeman
2022	Night Sky	Oren
2026	Hallowarrior	Royce
