= Simon Barrett (cricketer) =

English cricketer (born 1988)

Simon Barrett (born 1988) is an English cricketer. As a right handed batsman, he played for Leeds/Bradford University Centre of Cricketing Excellence. On his debut in first-class cricket, he scored 168 as opening batsman, versus Derbyshire.
