= We Are Still Here (2015 film) =

Film by Ted Geoghegan

- Release poster
- Directed by: Ted Geoghegan
- Written by: Ted Geoghegan
- Produced by: Travis Stevens
- Starring: Barbara Crampton; Andrew Sensenig; Larry Fessenden; Lisa Marie; Monte Markham
- Cinematography: Karim Hussain
- Edited by: Aaron Crozier; Josh Ethier
- Music by: Wojciech Golczewski
- Production companies: Snowfort Pictures; Dark Sky Films
- Distributed by: Dark Sky Films
- Release dates: March 15, 2015 (SXSW); June 5, 2015
- Running time: 84 minutes
- Country: United States
- Language: English

We Are Still Here is a 2015 American supernatural horror film about grieving parents who move to a rural New England house hoping for a fresh start, only to find that the home has a dark history. It is written and directed by Ted Geoghegan and stars Andrew Sensenig and Barbara Crampton as the grieving parents. The film had its world premiere at South by Southwest on March 15, 2015. It was released in the United States on June 5, 2015, by Dark Sky Films.

== Plot ==
In 1979, following the death of their son Bobby in a car crash, Anne and Paul Sacchetti have decided to move to a new home in rural New England. Paul hopes that it will be therapeutic for Anne, as the death has caused her to spiral into a deep depression. However, Anne starts claiming that Bobby is present in the house, and neighbor Cat McCabe warns them to leave. Cat’s husband Dave explains the house was built in the 19th century by the Dagmar family as a funeral home, and the Dagmars were reportedly run out of the village after townspeople discovered that they were swindling their customers by selling the corpses and burying empty caskets.

Undeterred, Anne invites her friends May and Jacob Lewis as they are both spiritualists and could help to contact Bobby. The couples go out to eat, during which time the Lewises’ son Harry arrives with his girlfriend Daniella. Harry is killed by an apparition in the basement and Daniella flees in horror, only to be killed too. The Lewises and the Sacchettis head home, after which Dave arrives at the restaurant, murdering a waitress who answers the door, and angrily discusses the Dagmar house with the bartender, revealing that the house needs to feed every 30 years or the evil beneath it will search out fresh souls, destroying the town.

Jacob manages to convince a reluctant Paul to hold a séance with him while their wives are out. This ends with Jacob becoming possessed by the spirit of Lassander Dagmar, who reveals that they were never run out of town; rather the villagers burned his family alive as a sacrifice to the evil under their home. Lassander, overcome with rage, causes Jacob to kill himself. His wife May tries to flee, only to be killed by Dave, who has come to the house with the other townspeople, determined to give the home what it wants. The Sacchettis hear the voice of Bobby urging them to leave, and flee upstairs as the townspeople break into the house.

The spirits of the Dagmar family proceed to violently murder most of the townspeople until only Dave, Paul, and Anne remain. Dave tries to kill Anne and Paul, but is killed by Lassander's spirit. As Paul and Anne stare at the carnage around them, the spirits of the family depart from the house, finally satisfied. Anne walks into the house's cellar after Bobby calls her, followed by Paul. As he peers down the stairs, Paul smiles and says "Hey Bobby."

== Cast ==
- Barbara Crampton as Anne Sacchetti
- Andrew Sensenig as Paul Sacchetti
- Larry Fessenden as Jacob Lewis
- Lisa Marie as May Lewis
- Monte Markham as Dave McCabe
- Susan Gibney as Maddie
- Michael Patrick as Harry Lewis
- Kelsea Dakota as Daniella
- Guy Gane III as Lassander Dagmar
- Elissa Dowling as Eloise Dagmar
- Zorah Burress as Fiona Dagmar
- Marvin Patterson as Joe, The Electrician
- Connie Neer as Cat McCabe
- Craig Simmons as Jethro

== Production ==
Filmmaker Ted Geoghegan began work on the film as a tribute to The House by the Cemetery (1981) while working as a publicist for Dark Sky Films. Geoghegan had previously collaborated with Andreas Schnaas on various "low-budget shlock movies" as a writer and producer, but had never directed a film beforehand. After completing the script, he showed it to Dark Sky Films and Travis Stevens of Snowfort Pictures, who both agreed to produce the film.

Filming took place on February 7, 2014, in Rochester, New York, and in the villages of Palmyra and Shortsville. According to the director and the end credit sequence of the film, the events take place in the fictional township of Aylesbury, Massachusetts.

== Soundtrack ==
We Are Still Here (Original Motion Picture Soundtrack)

Soundtrack album by Wojciech Golczewski
- Released: July 7, 2015
- Genre: Ambient
- Length: 34:31
- Label: Screamworks

The score was composed by Wojciech Golczewski. It was released on July 7, 2015, by Screamworks Records.

=== Track listing ===
No.	Title	Length
1.	"The House"	4:45
2.	"Harry"	2:02
3.	"The Dagmars"	3:07
4.	"Bobby"	2:12
5.	"Cellar"	2:58
6.	"It's Not Bobby"	5:39
7.	"The Séance"	3:05
8.	"Dagmar's Story"	2:28
9.	"The Attack"	3:46
10.	"Accept It"	4:28
Total length:		34:31

== Release ==
We Are Still Here had its world premiere at South by Southwest on March 15, 2015. The film was released in select theaters and on video on demand in the United States on June 5, 2015, by Dark Sky Films. It was released on DVD and Blu-ray in the U.S. on October 6, 2015. The film opened theatrically in Japan on December 12, 2015, and in Russia on December 17, 2015.

== Reception ==
On the review aggregator website Rotten Tomatoes, the film holds an approval rating of 95% based on 44 reviews. The website's critics consensus states, "Smart, powerfully acted, and devilishly clever, We Are Still Here offers some novel twists on familiar territory – and heralds the arrival of a major talent in writer-director Ted Geoghegan." On Metacritic, the film has a score of 65 out of 100 based on 7 critics, indicating "generally favorable" reviews.

We Are Still Here was positively received at its world premiere and subsequent release. It became one of the year's most critically acclaimed horror films. Rolling Stone named it one of the year's ten best horror films.

Common elements of praise centered upon the film's atmosphere and visuals, which Twitch Film called "stylish and mesmerizing". Film School Rejects rated the film positively, praising it for its jump scares and stating that it "shows love and affection for genre".
