= Simon Barrett (filmmaker) =

American filmmaker (born 1978)

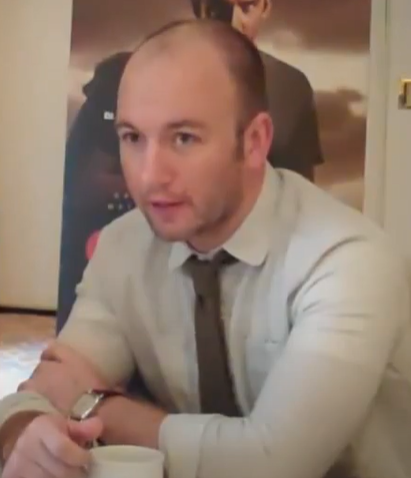
- Barrett in 2014
- Born: 1978 (age 47–48); Columbia, Missouri, US
- Occupations: Actor, producer, screenwriter
- Years active: 2000–present

Simon Barrett (born 1978) is an American actor, producer, screenwriter, and director known for his collaborations with Adam Wingard, including A Horrible Way to Die, V/H/S, V/H/S/2, You're Next, and The Guest. His feature directorial debut, Seance, was released in 2021.

== Early life ==
Barrett was born in Columbia, Missouri, in 1978.

== Career ==
Barrett has performed a number of roles in his films. He attributes this to the low budgets of his early films, in which he and frequent collaborator Adam Wingard were forced to act, as they could not afford to hire anyone else. Barrett credits his acting with informing him about the screenwriting process and techniques he'll use in the future.

Among his early work was writing the 2004 TV film Frankenfish, and collaborating with director Alex Turner as writer on Dead Birds (2004) and Red Sands (2009), period horror films. He first collaborated with Wingard on A Horrible Way to Die (2010) and continued with You're Next, in which he wrote, produced, and acted. He co-wrote Autoerotic (2011) with co-directors Wingard and Joe Swanberg. The three collaborated again that same year on What Fun We Were Having.

In 2012, he wrote a segment in The ABCs of Death for Wingard and joined V/H/S as a writer, producer, and actor; he returned to the 2013 sequel to write and direct a segment. Eric England cast Barrett in Contracted (2013) after meeting him and being impressed with his ability to blend into crowds despite his charisma. Swanberg cast Barrett and Wingard in 24 Exposures (2013) after being inspired by their working relationship and differing personalities. Also in 2013, Barrett wrote and directed a radio play for Larry Fessenden's Tales from Beyond the Pale. The Guest (2014) was another collaboration between Wingard and Barrett. They said the thriller theme of this film opened up additional doors to them, as they had previously been stereotyped as horror filmmakers.

In 2016, Barrett wrote Blair Witch. The next year, in 2017, he wrote Temple, directed by Michael Barrett.

In 2021, Barrett made his directorial debut with Seance, which he also wrote. The same year he wrote and directed the segment The Empty Wake of V/H/S/94.

In 2024, Barrett co-wrote Godzilla x Kong: The New Empire, also co-written and directed by Wingard. The same year he also wrote Azrael, directed by E. L. Katz.

Barrett was in works of a remake of the South Korean thriller film I Saw The Devil. It was announced in 2014. As of 2024, there hasn't yet been an update regarding this project. His other upcoming projects as a writer includes Onslaught (film), the live-action adaptation of the 1985 television series Thundercats, and the sequel to the 1997 film Face/Off, all of which will be directed by Wingard.

== Filmography ==
Film

Year	Title	Writer	Producer	Notes
2004	Dead Birds	Yes	co-producer	
2004	Frankenfish	Yes	No	TV movie
2009	Red Sands	Yes	co-producer	
2010	A Horrible Way to Die	Yes	Yes	Also first assistant director, casting director, location manager and music/post-production supervisor
2011	You're Next	Yes	Yes	
2011	Autoerotic	Yes	No	
2011	What Fun We Were Having: 4 Stories About Date Rape	Yes	No	
2014	The Guest	Yes	executive	
2016	Blair Witch	Yes	co-producer	
2017	Temple	Yes	No	
2021	Seance	Yes	No	Also director
2024	Azrael	Yes	Yes	
2024	Godzilla x Kong: The New Empire	Yes	No	
2026	Onslaught	Yes	Yes	

Acting roles

Year	Title	Role
2009	Red Sands	Matt Carson
2010	A Horrible Way to Die	Olsen
2011	You're Next	Tiger Mask
2013	Contracted	B. J.
2013	24 Exposures	Michael Bamfeaux

Short film

Year	Title	Director	Writer	Producer	Role	Notes
2000	The Nothing Deal	Yes	Yes	Yes		Also cinematographer and editor
2012	Tape 56	No	Yes	Yes	Steve	Segment of V/H/S
2012	The Sick Thing that happened to Emily when she was Younger	No	Yes	No	None	Segment of V/H/S ; Also camera operator
2012	Q is for Quack	No	Yes	No	Simon Barrett	Segment of The ABCs of Death
2013	Tape 49	Yes	Yes	executive	Steve	Segment of V/H/S/2
2013	Phase I Clinical Trials	No	Yes	executive		Segment of V/H/S/2 ; also set photographer
2021	The Empty Wake	Yes	Yes	No		Segment of V/H/S/94
