= Godzilla x Kong: The New Empire =

2024 film by Adam Wingard

- Theatrical release poster
- Directed by: Adam Wingard
- Screenplay by: Terry Rossio; Simon Barrett; Jeremy Slater
- Story by: Terry Rossio; Adam Wingard; Simon Barrett
- Based on: Godzilla and Mothra by Toho Co., Ltd.
- Produced by: Thomas Tull; Jon Jashni; Brian Rogers; Mary Parent; Alex Garcia; Eric McLeod
- Starring: Rebecca Hall; Brian Tyree Henry; Dan Stevens; Kaylee Hottle; Alex Ferns; Fala Chen
- Cinematography: Ben Seresin
- Edited by: Josh Schaeffer
- Music by: Tom Holkenborg; Antonio Di Iorio
- Production company: Legendary Pictures
- Distributed by: Warner Bros. Pictures (Worldwide); Toho Co., Ltd. (Japan)
- Release dates: March 25, 2024 (TCL Chinese Theatre); March 29, 2024 (United States)
- Running time: 115 minutes
- Country: United States
- Language: English
- Budget: $135–150 million
- Box office: $572.5 million

Godzilla x Kong: The New Empire (Note: According to Wingard, the "x" in the film's title is silent, though he pronounces it in the abbreviation GxK. The "x" is meant by Legendary Pictures to indicate more of a collaboration than a fight rematch.) is a 2024 American monster film directed and co-written by Adam Wingard. Produced by Legendary Pictures and distributed by Warner Bros. Pictures, it is a sequel to Godzilla vs. Kong (2021) and the fifth film in Legendary's Monsterverse franchise, as well as the 38th film in the Godzilla franchise (Note: It is the fifth Godzilla film to be completely produced by an American studio. The American releases of Godzilla (Godzilla, King of the Monsters!), King Kong vs. Godzilla, and The Return of Godzilla (Godzilla 1985) featured additional footage produced by independent American studios. The footage featured Western actors and merged it with the original Japanese footage in order to appeal to American audiences. Invasion of Astro-Monster was the first Godzilla film to be co-produced between a Japanese studio (Toho) and an American studio (UPA). The 1998 film Godzilla produced by TriStar Pictures is the first Godzilla film to be completely produced by an American studio.) and the 13th in the King Kong franchise. The film stars Rebecca Hall, Brian Tyree Henry, Dan Stevens, Kaylee Hottle, Alex Ferns, and Fala Chen. Hall, Henry, and Hottle reprise their roles from the previous film; it is Hottle's final role before her death in 2026. In the film, Kong encounters more of his species in the Hollow Earth and must unite again with Godzilla to stop the tyrannical Skar King and the powerful, frost-breathing Shimo from invading the Earth's surface.

Following the box office and streaming success of Godzilla vs. Kong during the COVID-19 pandemic, Legendary announced a sequel in March 2022 and that filming would commence later that year. In May 2022, it was announced that Wingard would return to direct and Stevens had been cast as a lead. Filming began in July 2022 in Gold Coast, Australia, and finished in November 2022.

Godzilla x Kong: The New Empire premiered at Grauman's Chinese Theatre on March 25, 2024, and was released in the United States on March 29. The film received mixed reviews from critics, with many comparing it unfavorably to Godzilla Minus One, which had been released four months prior. It grossed $572.5 million worldwide against a production budget of $135–150 million, becoming the eighth-highest-grossing film of 2024 and the highest-grossing film of the Monsterverse, as well as in the Godzilla and King Kong franchises.

A sequel, Godzilla x Kong: Supernova, is planned for March 26, 2027.

== Plot ==
Three years after defeating Mechagodzilla, (Note: As depicted in Godzilla vs. Kong (2021)) Kong has established his new territory in Hollow Earth and searches for more of his kind. On the Earth's surface, Godzilla takes residence in the Colosseum and continues to maintain order between humanity and giant monsters, known as "Titans"; he kills Titanus Scylla for attacking Rome, Italy.

A Monarch observation outpost stationed in Hollow Earth picks up an unidentified signal. On the surface, the signal causes Jia, the last known survivor of the Iwi tribe from Skull Island, to experience hallucinations and visions in school, causing her adoptive mother, Kong expert Dr. Ilene Andrews, to worry. Also sensing the signal, Godzilla leaves Rome and attacks a nuclear plant in France to absorb radiation. He then heads to the lair of the Titan Tiamat in the Arctic. Monarch believes Godzilla is strengthening himself for an oncoming threat.

When a sinkhole opens near his home, Kong discovers an uncharted realm where a tribe of his species has survived, including a juvenile ape named Suko. After a brief initial confrontation, Kong convinces Suko to lead him to the tribe's lair and the two slowly bond on their journey. Andrews, Jia, Titan veterinarian Trapper, and conspiracy podcaster Bernie Hayes travel to Hollow Earth to locate the source of the signal and find the Monarch outpost destroyed. As they follow the signal, they discover a temple that leads them to a subterranean section, housing a surviving Iwi tribe, who communicate telepathically with each other and live beneath portals to the surface. Inspecting the temple, they realize that the signal was a telepathic distress call sent by the Iwi. While observing Jia socializing with the Iwi, Andrews voices her fears to Trapper that Jia may choose to stay with her people and that Andrews would have to accept it.

Inside a temple, Andrews uncovers hieroglyphics displaying the past and future: a tyrannical ape titan known as the Skar King once attempted to conquer the surface world and waged war against Godzilla's species, nearly defeating him until Godzilla defeated him by trapping the Skar King and his tribe deep within Hollow Earth with the ice-breathing titan Shimo, whose power covered the Earth in the last Ice Age. The prophecy also indicates that Jia is the key to reawakening Mothra. Kong encounters the tribe and confronts the Skar King. After a brief battle, Skar King resorts to summoning his enslaved ice-breathing Titan Shimo, using a crystal that causes her pain and forces her to attack Kong. Shimo's ice breath injures Kong's right arm, causing frostbite. With Suko's help, Kong manages to escape, though he loses his axe in the process. Sensing Jia, Kong locates the temple and is fitted by Trapper with a prototype exoskeletal glove, known as the B.E.A.S.T. Glove, to strengthen and heal his frostbitten arm. Unknown to them, an ape follows them and informs the Skar King that the protective barrier leading to the surface portals has been opened. Jia successfully awakens the reborn Mothra.

Meanwhile, Godzilla kills Tiamat and absorbs cosmic radiation from her lair, which turns his dorsal plates magenta and spikier. Hoping to lure Godzilla to Hollow Earth to assist him, Kong surfaces in Cairo and calls out to him. Despite Kong's attempts to communicate, an enraged Godzilla attacks him, and a brief fight ensues until Mothra intervenes and soothes Godzilla. The three Titans return to the Hollow Earth and engage the Skar King's forces in battle. The Skar King and Shimo manage to use one of the portals to escape to the surface, forcing Godzilla and Kong to chase them to Rio de Janeiro, where Shimo induces a second ice age at the Skar King's command. The factions are evenly matched until Suko arrives with Kong's axe and destroys the control crystal. Now free, Shimo turns on the Skar King and freezes him solid, allowing Kong to shatter him to pieces.

After undoing Shimo's ice age with his atomic breath, Godzilla returns to rest in the Colosseum. Jia alleviates Andrews' concerns by choosing to stay with her. Mothra restores the protective barrier of the Iwi's home and the portals. Kong returns with Shimo and Suko to Hollow Earth where he reunites with his tribe and becomes their new leader.

== Cast ==
- Rebecca Hall as Dr. Ilene Andrews, a scientist and anthropological linguist at Monarch
- Brian Tyree Henry as Bernie Hayes, a conspiracy theorist and former Apex employee
- Dan Stevens as Trapper, a veterinarian at Monarch
- Kaylee Hottle as Jia, last known survivor of the Iwi tribe and Ilene's adopted daughter. This was Hottle's final film role before her death in 2026.
- Alex Ferns as Mikael, a pilot at Monarch
- Fala Chen as Iwi Queen, the ruler of Hollow Earth's Iwi tribe
- Rachel House as Hampton
- Ron Smyck as Harris
- Chantelle Jamieson as Jayne
- Greg Hatton as Lewis
- Kevin Copeland as Submarine Commander
- Tess Dobré as Submarine Officer
- Tim Carroll as Wilcox
- Anthony Brandon Wong as Talk Show Announcer
- Allan Henry as the performance captureer of:
  - Kong, a giant ape-like Titan
  - Skar King, a Titan with chimpanzee, gibbon, and orangutan-like traits
- Luke Hawker as Suko (motion capture)

== Production ==
=== Development ===
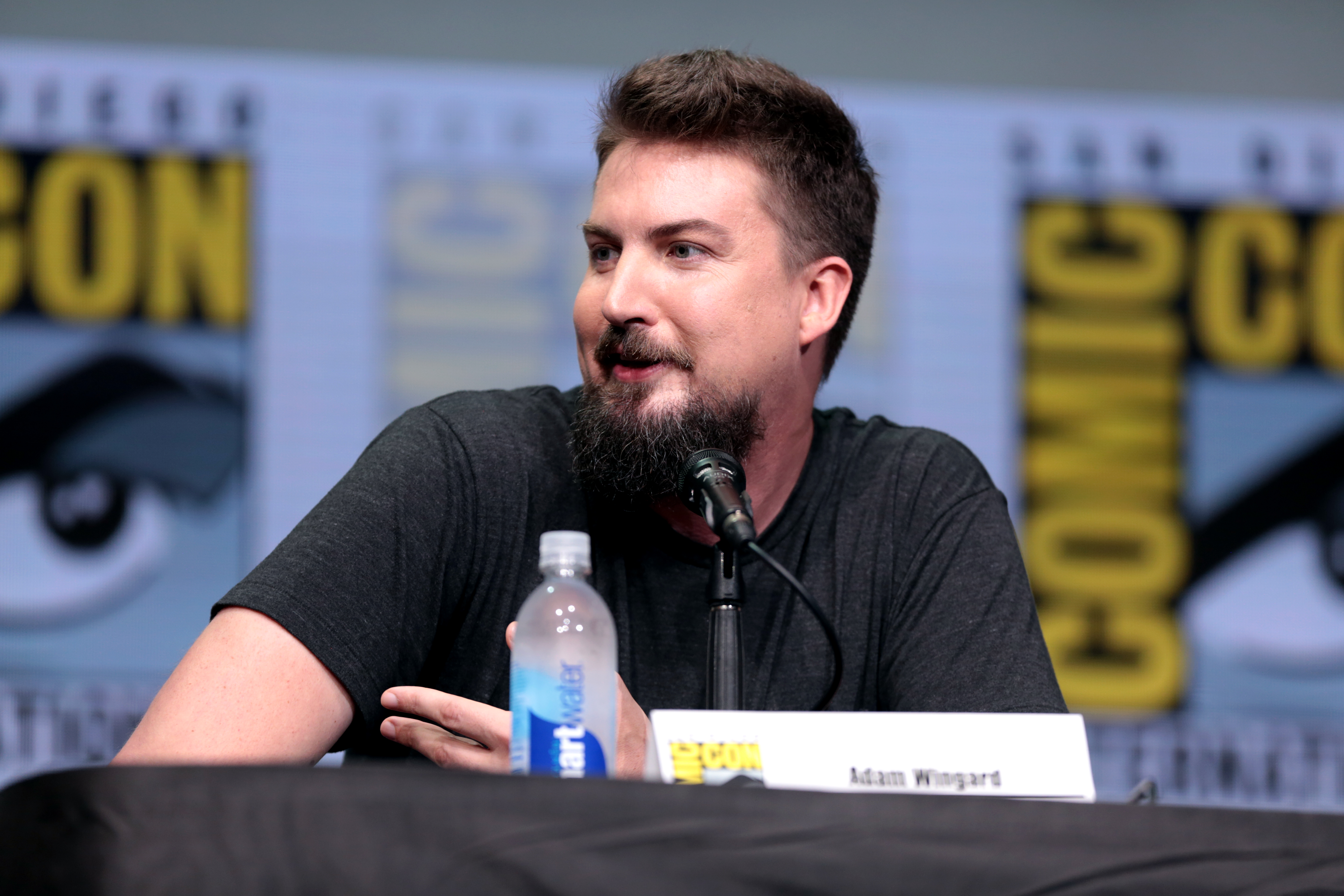
Adam Wingard (pictured 2017), the director of Godzilla vs. Kong, returned for this film.

In March 2019, producer Alex Garcia stated that Legendary Pictures hoped to produce more Monsterverse films if they became successful, stating, "It's one brick at a time, each piece has to be as good as it can be, so right now it's all focused on this [Godzilla: King of the Monsters and Godzilla vs. Kong]. But could there be? Yeah, that's the hope if the movies turn out really well." In February 2021, Wingard commented on the future of the Monsterverse, "I know where we could go potentially with future films." However, he noted that the Monsterverse was created "to a certain degree" to lead towards Godzilla vs. Kong. He added that the Monsterverse is at a "crossroads", stating, "It's really at the point where audiences have to kind of step forward and vote for more of these things. If this movie is a success obviously they will continue forward."

Godzilla vs. Kong was released on March 24, 2021, in theaters and HBO Max simultaneously and was a success on both platforms, despite theater shutdowns from the ongoing COVID-19 pandemic at the time. The film grossed $470 million worldwide against a break-even point of $330 million, became the most successful launch title in HBO Max's history until it was overtaken by Mortal Kombat, and became the most pirated film of 2021.

On April 4, 2021, Legendary's CEO Josh Grode commented on potential sequels, "we have a number of ideas for more movies." That same day, the hashtag #ContinueTheMonsterverse began trending on Twitter, which was acknowledged by Legendary and garnered support from Jordan Vogt-Roberts, director of Kong: Skull Island (2017). On April 27, 2021, The Hollywood Reporter stated that Legendary was "quietly taking steps to stretch the series into one or more installments" while negotiating with Wingard to potentially return to direct. Various ideas were considered, with Son of Kong being one potential title. In August 2021, Monsterverse writer Max Borenstein stated that "there will be some new, interesting installments coming" due to the success of Godzilla vs. Kong.

On March 20, 2022, it was announced that a sequel to Godzilla vs. Kong was scheduled to commence filming later in the year in the Gold Coast, Queensland, and other locations in South East Queensland. In May 2022, it was announced that Wingard would return to direct and that Dan Stevens had been cast as a lead. Wingard and Stevens had previously worked together on The Guest (2014). In May 2022, Production Weekly reported that the film's working title was Origins. On June 30, 2022, it was revealed that Mary Parent, Alex Garcia, Eric McLeod, Brian Rogers, Thomas Tull and Jon Jashni would return to produce. On July 1, 2022, Toho confirmed that the film would feature Godzilla.

=== Pre-production ===
Wingard recalled that pre-production on the film began in January 2022. In August 2022, Warner Bros. Pictures and Legendary announced a new synopsis and that Rebecca Hall, Brian Tyree Henry and Kaylee Hottle would reprise their roles from Godzilla vs Kong while Fala Chen, Alex Ferns and Rachel House would join the cast as well. It was also revealed that Wingard would collaborate once more with production designer Tom Hammock, editor Josh Schaeffer, composer Tom Holkenborg, and that Terry Rossio had returned to write the script with Jeremy Slater and Wingard's frequent collaborator Simon Barrett. Ultimately, Rossio, Barrett, and Slater received "screenplay by" credit, while Rossio, Wingard, and Barrett received "story by" credit; Michael Dougherty and Zach Shields, both of whom co-wrote Godzilla: King of the Monsters and Godzilla vs. Kong, shared off-screen "additional literary material" credit with James Ashcroft, Eli Kent, and Nicole Perlman. Extensive previsualization was done by The Third Floor, that included checking on Google Earth the locations in Rio de Janeiro that production wanted to use in the climactic battle.

=== Filming ===
Principal photography commenced in the Gold Coast, Queensland, on July 29, 2022. At the start of production, Ben Seresin was confirmed to have returned as director of photography. In November 2022, it was reported that filming had finished in Australia and that crew gear revealed the film's potential title, at the time, as Godzilla and Kong. A unit composed mostly of visual effects people went to Rio de Janeiro both to film the plates onto which the effects would be composited and to gather extensive data for a digital recreation of the city, that included aerial photography and Lidar. Surfers Paradise was turned into the Rio beach where the climactic battle starts.

=== Post-production ===
The film's visual effects were supervised by Alessandro Ongaro. Wingard confirmed that Mothra's inclusion was always part of the plan. However, Legendary did not have the rights to Mothra by the time that post-production began and used a placeholder character named "Phosphera" until the rights were secured. Wingard also refuted rumors that Phosphera was replaced with Mothra due to poor testing, iterating that Mothra was included as far back as the first draft.

Scanline VFX did the opening scene with Kong being chased by "Wart-Dogs" - which were likened to wolves and African wild dogs, with "the twitchy, unpredictable energy of a hyena - and the climactic fights in both Egypt and Rio, along with the mechanical glove worn by Kong. DNEG handled many scenes with Godzilla and Kong in the surface, along with the Hollow World's jungles and the Iwi's crystal pyramid.

Wētā FX did the Hollow Earth, its giant apes - that added up to 130 in the scenes on Skar King's lair - and Shimo. Skar King was designed as a long and skinny orangutan to enhance his contrast to Kong, with supervisor Kevin Smith summing up with "Kong is Mike Tyson, but Skar King is a little shifty and more graceful". His long arms required motion capture to be performed adding extensions and prosthetics to the performers. His weapon built out of spines was described as particularly complex, featuring "108 or 110 vertebrae, plus the jaw handle and the thing at the end". Shimo was noted as an attempt at "a fine balance between creating something beautiful but also menacing at the same time" that would move in a cat-like manner, "not super brutal like Godzilla would be". Her ice breath had up to 30 layers of effects, including frozen vapor and ice shards.

Wingard told the crew to not worry too much about scale and relative speed so the monsters could still move quickly, with one of the adaptations being changing the gravity and speed of the water simulations. The rendering was done in 5K resolution given the film was shot with wide anamorphic lenses.

=== Influences ===
After watching the trailer for Godzilla Minus One (2023), Wingard and Ongaro decided to pay tribute to that film by recreating a shot of the ground bursting beneath Godzilla's footfall for the film's Rome sequence. The Egyptian battle between Godzilla and Kong was inspired by the fight scene between Roddy Piper and Keith David from They Live (1988).

== Music ==
In August 2022, Tom Holkenborg was announced to return to compose as co-composers the film's score, after previously doing so for Godzilla vs. Kong. In December 2023, it was announced that Antonio Di Iorio would co-compose the score with Holkenborg. A single was released on March 13, 2024, by WaterTower Music, titled "Main Title Theme". The full soundtrack album was released on March 22, 2024.

For the Japanese release, artists Ai, Yaffle, and OZworld contributed the track "Rise Together" as the film's theme, which was released on April 17, 2024.

== Release ==
=== Theatrical ===
Godzilla x Kong: The New Empire held its red carpet premiere at the Grauman's Chinese Theatre on March 25, 2024. Afterward, it was released internationally on March 27 and in the United States on March 29, and was released in Japan on April 26 via Toho. It was previously slated to be released on March 15 and April 12. Incidentally, Toho's Godzilla Minus One was withdrawn from U.S. theaters eight weeks before the release of Godzilla x Kong: The New Empire.

=== Home media ===
The film was released on digital platforms on May 14, 2024, and on Blu-ray, DVD and Ultra HD Blu-ray on June 11, 2024. Godzilla x Kong: The New Empire became available to stream on Max on July 4, 2024.

== Reception ==
=== Box office ===
Godzilla x Kong: The New Empire grossed $196.8 million in the United States and Canada, and $375.7 million in other territories, for a worldwide total of $572.5 million. As of 2024, it holds the record for the highest-grossing Godzilla film ever.

In the United States and Canada, Godzilla x Kong was initially projected to gross $50–55 million from 3,850 theaters in its opening weekend and an additional $80–90 million from 63 international territories. After making $37 million on its first day, including $10 million from Thursday previews, the best-ever total for a Monsterverse film, estimates were raised to $75 million over the domestic weekend. It went on to debut at $80 million, topping the box office and becoming the second-best opening weekend of the series and the fifth-best Easter weekend of all time, behind Batman v Superman: Dawn of Justice (2016), Furious 7 (2015), The Super Mario Bros. Movie (2023) and The Fate of the Furious (2017). In its second weekend, the film made $31.2 million (a drop of 61%), remaining in first. In its third weekend, the film made $15.5 million, finishing second behind newcomer Civil War. Meanwhile, the film debuted at number two in Japan, behind Detective Conan: The Million-dollar Pentagram.

=== Critical response ===
Godzilla x Kong: The New Empire received mixed reviews from critics. On the review aggregator website Rotten Tomatoes, 54% of 251 critics' reviews are positive, with an average rating of 5.7/10. The website's consensus reads: "Come to Godzilla x Kong: The New Empire for the sheer monster-mashing spectacle -- and stay for that too, because the movie doesn't have much else to offer." Metacritic, which uses a weighted average, assigned the film a score of 47 out of 100, based on 51 critics, indicating "mixed or average" reviews. Audiences polled by CinemaScore gave the film an average grade of "A–" on an A+ to F scale, while PostTrak reported 96% of audience members said the film "met or exceeded their expectations".

Several critics compared the film unfavorably to Toho's Godzilla Minus One, which had been released in the United States in December 2023. (Note: Attributed to multiple references:) Owen Gleiberman of Variety found Godzilla x Kong: The New Empire mediocre, likening it more to a superhero film, but felt that it was unfortunate that the film was released too soon after Godzilla Minus One, comparing that film with "lyrical majesty" and Godzilla x Kong more like a "product", but admitted that the film delivers on the monster battles, praising the Rome battle. Michael Philips of Chicago Tribune wrote, "Godzilla X Kong makes up for its own deficiencies with oddball flourishes. Wingard and the writers work like rogue chefs at an Olive Garden, tossing everything they can at any number of walls to see what sticks." Pete Hammond from Deadline Hollywood likened the scenes with the Ape tribe to Planet of the Apes and noted that Godzilla, despite getting top billing and referenced repeatedly in the film, mostly plays a supporting role. He felt the human characters were the same "one dimensional caricatures" typically found in monster films, but admitted that they had a "nice rapport" regardless. Like Gleiberman, Hammond compared the film to Godzilla Minus One, calling it "far more impressive" than Godzilla x Kong and suggested that Legendary hire that film's team next. James Berardinelli also expressed dissatisfaction for the film and suggested that Godzilla Minus One writer-director Takashi Yamazaki make the next Monsterverse film. The Sioux City Journal criticized the film's visual effects as inferior to those in Godzilla Minus One.

Beyond the main cast, the humans in this movie exist only to get squashed like ants by falling debris and mangled buildings. They are expendable, but it doesn't matter. The meaning of these films isn't in metaphor at all. It's in punching.

— Alissa Wilkinson, The New York Times

The Guardian praised the choreography and cited Rebecca Hall's performance as "ever luminous", but felt that Dan Stevens and Brian Tyree Henry struggled to convey the comedy they were entrusted with for their parts. The film's journey to the climax was a "mixed bag", wrote Empire, and its characters were "shallow but fun". IndieWire decried the CGI for being dull and not taking full advantage of its potential, suggesting that the filmmakers should have used Godzilla (2014) as a reference point to emphasize the gravitas of the monster scenes. The Los Angeles Times described the film as a "roaring headache" but cited "two impressively goopy moments" in the beginning and the horror-like approach brought by the director "with a penchant for gleeful experimentation and over-the-top style".

=== Accolades ===
Accolades received by Ghostbusters: Frozen Empire
Award	Date of ceremony	Category	Recipient(s)	Result	Ref.
Chinese American Film Festival	November 8, 2024	Most Popular U.S. Film in China	Godzilla X Kong: The New Empire	Won	
Family Film and TV Awards	November 9, 2024	Best Feature Film	Godzilla X Kong: The New Empire	Nominated	
Indiana Film Journalists Association Awards	December 16, 2024	Best Visual Effects	Kevin Smith; Kevin Sherwood; Bruce Bright; Michael Meinardus	Nominated	
Saturn Awards	February 2, 2025	Best Fantasy Film	Godzilla x Kong: The New Empire	Nominated	
Saturn Awards	February 2, 2025	Best Performance by a Younger Actor in a Film	Kaylee Hottle	Nominated	
Annie Award	February 8, 2025	Outstanding Achievement for Character Animation in a Live Action Production	Ludovic Chailloleau; Jonathan Paquin; Craig Penn; Florian Fernandez; Marco Barbati	Nominated	

== Sequel ==
Two months after the release and success of Godzilla x Kong: The New Empire, a sequel was announced with Grant Sputore directing. The film is planned to be released on March 26, 2027.

== Bibliography ==
- Kalat, David (2010). A Critical History and Filmography of Toho's Godzilla Series (Second ed.). McFarland. ISBN 9780786447497.
- Mirjahangir, Chris (2019). Interview with Alex Garcia and Zach Shield (Audio). Toho Kingdom. Archived from the original on June 21, 2022.
- "Untitled Godzilla vs. Kong Sequel Feature Film". Production Weekly. No. 1299. May 19, 2022. Archived from the original on June 9, 2022.
- Ryfle, Steve (1998). Japan's Favorite Mon-Star: The Unauthorized Biography of the Big G. ECW Press. ISBN 1550223488.
