= Adam Wingard =

American filmmaker (born 1982)

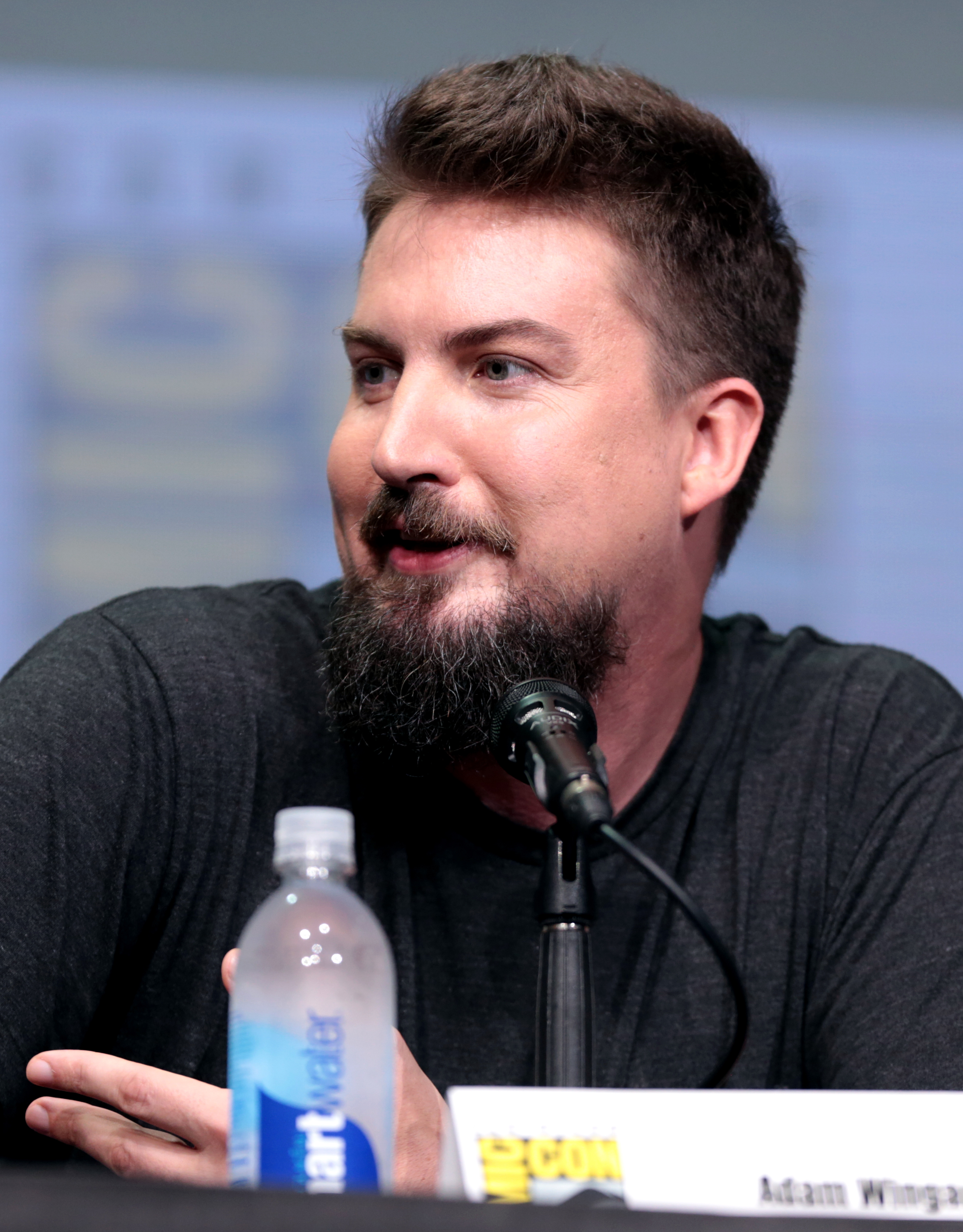
- Wingard at the 2017 San Diego Comic-Con
- Born: December 3, 1982 (age 43); Oak Ridge, Tennessee, U.S.
- Education: Full Sail University (BS)
- Occupations: Film director; film producer; screenwriter; editor; cinematographer; composer
- Years active: 2004–present

Adam Wingard (/ˈwɪŋɡɑːrd/ WING-gard; born December 3, 1982) is an American filmmaker. He has served as a film director, producer, screenwriter, editor, cinematographer, actor, and composer on numerous American films.

Following an early career as a member of the mumblecore movement, he became notable for his works in the horror and action genres, especially the films You're Next (2011), and The Guest (2014), and the bigger-budget franchise films Blair Witch (2016), Death Note (2017), Godzilla vs. Kong (2021), and its sequel Godzilla x Kong: The New Empire (2024).

== Early life ==
Wingard was born in Oak Ridge, Tennessee and graduated from Full Sail University in 2002.

== Career ==
His first feature, the horror comedy Home Sick, starring Bill Moseley and Tiffany Shepis, was a stepping stone to his second feature, the psychotropic ghost story horror film Pop Skull. Made on a total budget of $2,000, Pop Skull had its international premiere at the Rome Film Festival and its domestic premiere at the AFI Film Festival in 2007. A Horrible Way to Die (2010) and What Fun We Were Having (2011) that followed.

The romantic horror film A Horrible Way to Die premiered at the 2010 Toronto International Film Festival in the Vanguard section and was acquired by Starz/Anchor Bay at the festival for a North American theatrical and home media release. What Fun We Were Having: 4 Stories About Date Rape is a 4-part anthology that had its premiere at the 2011 Fantastia Film Festival in Montreal, Canada where Wingard was honored by the festival with his own sidebar section: “Medicated Monsters – A Spotlight on Filmmaker Adam Wingard”.

In 2011, Wingard co-directed Autoerotic with the actor and filmmaker Joe Swanberg. He was selected to direct one chapter of The ABCs of Death, a 26-chapter horror comedy anthology for Drafthouse Films and Magnet. A solo directorial effort, You're Next, a home invasion slasher, premiered at the 2011 Toronto International Film Festival as part of the ‘Midnight Madness’ section. The film was acquired by Lionsgate and received a wide release in August 2013 to favorable reviews.

In 2013, Wingard was offered the project "Skull Island" by Peter Jackson, director of the 2005 remake of King Kong who had been interested in producing a sequel to the film with Wingard as director and Simon Barrett writing it. Jackson had been impressed with Wingard's work in You're Next, and investigated a potential sequel. However, Universal Pictures rights abandoned due to acquired film rights to Warner Bros, which complicated a sequel to an unproduced movie. Wingard pivoted to offering a modern-day sequel, but ultimately nothing came of the proposal.

In 2014, Wingard directed The Guest starring Dan Stevens, which premiered at the Sundance Film Festival, the Toronto International Film Festival and Fantastic Fest, receiving wide critical acclaim upon its wider theatrical release in mid-September. Wingard directed the found-footage horror film Blair Witch, based on a script by Simon Barrett. The film is a sequel to the 1999 The Blair Witch Project and received mixed reviews.

In 2015, Wingard signed on to direct a live action American film adaptation of Tsugumi Ohba and Takeshi Obata's popular horror crime-thriller manga series Death Note. The neo-noir dark fantasy horror-thriller was released on Netflix on August 25, 2017, to a mixed reception, with criticism aimed at the number of changes from the source material, rushed plot, shallow execution, writing and the pacing while praise was aimed at the visual style, direction, performances of the cast, soundtrack and the dark, macabre sense of humour, along with the attempted unique and distinctive take on the Death Note mythos. Despite the mixed response, the film was considered a sizable enough success for Netflix to develop a sequel in 2018 with Greg Russo writing the script. No word has been made on whether Wingard is set to return as director.

In May 2017, Wingard was announced as the director for Godzilla vs. Kong, which was released in March 2021. In February 2021, it was announced that Wingard would direct and co-write, with Simon Barrett, a sequel to Face/Off. In March 2021, Wingard was announced as the director of ThunderCats, also co-writing it with Barrett. In May 2021, it was announced that Wingard would direct an adaptation of the comic Hardcore by Robert Kirkman. Wingard will also write the screenplay with Will Simmons from a story by Kirkman.

In April 2021, The Hollywood Reporter stated that Legendary was "quietly taking steps" to stretch the MonsterVerse into "one or more installments," while negotiating with Wingard to potentially return to direct. Various ideas were being considered, with Son of Kong being one potential title. In May 2022, it was reported that Wingard would return to direct a sequel to Godzilla vs. Kong, entitled Godzilla x Kong: The New Empire. Wingard is set to direct an action thriller film entitled Onslaught, which began filming in autumn 2024 and wrapped in early 2025.

== Awards and nominations ==
Wingard's film Pop Skull won the Best Feature Film award at the Indianapolis International Film Festival and the Jury award at the Boston Underground Film Festival. Wingard's A Horrible Way to Die won Best Screenplay (Simon Barrett), Best Actor (A.J. Bowen) and Best Actress (Amy Seimetz) at the 2010 Fantastic Fest in Austin, Texas. Wingard's You're Next won Best Picture, Best Director, Best Screenplay (Simon Barrett), and Best Actress (Sharni Vinson) at the 2011 Fantastic Fest in Austin, Texas.

== Filmography ==
=== Film ===
Director

Year	Title	Director	Writer	Producer	DoP	Editor	Notes
2007	Home Sick	Yes	No	No	No	No	
2007	Pop Skull	Yes	Yes	Yes	Yes	Yes	
2010	A Horrible Way to Die	Yes	No	No	No	Yes	Also camera operator and music supervisor
2011	Autoerotic	Yes (Note: Co-directed with Joe Swanberg)	Yes	No	Yes	Yes	Also camera operator
2011	What Fun We Were Having: 4 Stories About Date Rape	Yes	Yes	No	Yes	Yes	
2011	You're Next	Yes	No	No	No	Yes	Also composer
2014	The Guest	Yes	No	No	No	Yes	
2016	Blair Witch	Yes	No	Co-producer	No	No	Also composer
2017	Death Note	Yes	No	No	No	No	
2021	Godzilla vs. Kong	Yes	No	No	No	No	
2024	Godzilla x Kong: The New Empire	Yes	Story	Executive	No	No	
2026	Onslaught	Yes	Story	Yes	No	No	

Director of photography

- Blackmail Boys (2010)
- Caitlin Plays Herself (2011)
- Art History (2011)
- The Zone (2011)
- Marriage Material (2012)

Editor

- The Last Survivors (2014)

Acting roles

Year	Title	Role
2007	Pop Skull	Raymond
2010	Autoerotic	
2011	Art History	Bill
2013	24 Exposures	Billy
2014	The Last Survivors	Compound Soldier
2020	She Dies Tomorrow	Dune Buggy Man
2024	Godzilla x Kong: The New Empire	M.U.L.E Pilot (uncredited)

=== Television ===
Year	Title	Director	Editor	Notes
2007	An Evening with P. Oswalt	No	Yes	Live comedy show
2016	Outcast	Yes	No	Episode: "A Darkness Surrounds Him"; Also executive producer

=== Short films ===
Year	Title	Director	Writer	Producer	DoP	Editor	Actor	Role	Notes
2004	The Little One	Yes	No	No	Yes	Yes	No		
2005	The Girlfriend	Yes	No	No	Yes	Yes	No		
2007	1000 Year Sleep	Yes	Yes	No	Yes	Yes	No		
2008	Laura Panic	Yes	Yes	No	Yes	Yes	No		
2008	Paradox Mary	Yes	Yes	No	Yes	Yes	No		
2008	Little Sister Gone	Yes	No	No	No	No	No		
2009	Her Name is Laura Panic	Yes	No	No	No	No	No		
2011	Ultra Modern	Yes	No	No	No	No	No		Segment from 60 Seconds of Solitude in Year Zero
2012	Tape 56	Yes	No	Yes	Yes	Yes	Yes	Brad	Segment from V/H/S; Also camera operator and sound designer
2012	Q is for Quack	Yes	No	No	No	No	Yes	Adam	Segment from The ABCs of Death
2013	Phase I Clinical Trials	Yes	No	Executive	No	Yes	Yes	Herman	Segment from V/H/S/2; Also set photographer

Special thanks
Year	Title
2013	Cheap Thrills
2017	XX
