= A Horrible Way to Die =

2010 American horror film

- Theatrical release poster
- Directed by: Adam Wingard
- Written by: Simon Barrett
- Produced by: Travis Stevens; Simon Barrett; Kim Sherman
- Starring: A. J. Bowen; Amy Seimetz; Joe Swanberg; Brandon Carroll; Lane Hughes
- Cinematography: Chris Hilleke; Mark Shelhorse
- Edited by: Adam Wingard
- Music by: Jasper Justice Leigh
- Production company: Two Squirrels/Snowfort Pictures
- Distributed by: Anchor Bay Films; Celluloid Nightmares
- Release date: September 14, 2010 (TIFF)
- Running time: 87 minutes
- Country: United States
- Language: English
- Budget: $75,000

A Horrible Way to Die is a 2010 American horror film directed and edited by Adam Wingard, written by co-producer Simon Barrett, and starring A. J. Bowen, Amy Seimetz, Joe Swanberg, Brandon Carroll, and Lane Hughes. The story follows an escaped serial killer as he chases down his recovering alcoholic ex-girlfriend who is responsible for his incarceration. The film had its world premiere at the 2010 Toronto International Film Festival Vanguard program where it was picked up for distribution by Anchor Bay Entertainment. It also played at Fantastic Fest where it received three major awards: Best Screenplay for Simon Barrett, Best Actor for A. J. Bowen and Best Actress for Amy Seimetz.

== Plot ==
In rural Missouri, notorious serial killer Garrick Turrell (A. J. Bowen) escapes from police custody. He begins travelling towards his ex-girlfriend, Sarah, who is responsible for his arrest. Along the way, he murders several strangers and appears at times remorseful for the murders. Meanwhile, having met at group therapy for recovering alcoholics, Sarah (Amy Seimetz) and Kevin (Joe Swanberg) begin to develop a relationship and ultimately sleep together.

Kevin leads Sarah to a cabin in the woods, where she discovers that he and two other men they meet there are serial killer fans. The trio plan to kill Sarah because she reported their idol, Turrell, to the police when she discovered he was a killer. They hang Sarah upside down and begin to torture her, when Turrell arrives at the cabin. It is revealed that one of the trio has been sending Turrell coded messages in prison, detailing Sarah's location and their plans to kill her.

Turrell explains to the trio that he bears no ill will towards Sarah, because he misled her about his true nature. He also confesses that he enjoyed prison because it was extremely difficult to hurt people there, and although he feels compelled to kill, he also regrets it afterward. He only broke out of prison because he realized they planned to kill Sarah and wanted to stop them. Turrell attacks and kills the three men, who fatally wound him in the struggle. Dying, Turrell frees Sarah, who flees the cabin.

== Cast ==
- A. J. Bowen as Garrick Turrell
- Amy Seimetz as Sarah
- Joe Swanberg as Kevin
- Brandon Carroll as Rusty
- Lane Hughes as Reed
- Holly Voges as Carla
- Kelsey Munger as Elisabeth
- Michael Anthony Miller as Steven
- Ed Hanson as Mr. Harper
- Frank Stack as Elderly Man
- Whitney Moore as Daphne
- Gabriel Wallace as Werner
- Kirstin Denise Racicot as Chelsea
- Travis Stevens as Craig
- Cathe Frank as Maddy
- Jen Huemmer as Dark-haired woman
- Melissa Boatright as Jessie
- Simon Barrett as Olsen

== Production ==
Barrett estimated the budget at $75,000.

== Release ==
A Horrible Way to Die debuted on 14 September 2010 at the Toronto International Film Festival and opened in other film festivals on the dates given below.

Region	Release date	Festival
Canada	September 14, 2010	Toronto International Film Festival
United States	September 26, 2010	Fantastic Fest
Spain	October 11, 2010	Sitges Film Festival
United States	October 15, 2010	Hawaii International Film Festival
United States	October 16, 2010	Philadelphia Film Festival
United States	November 6, 2010	Denver International Film Festival
Sweden	November 12, 2010	Stockholm International Film Festival
United Kingdom	November 14, 2010	Leeds International Film Festival
Canada	April 15, 2011	Calgary Underground Film Festival

The film has been shown as a special Valentine's Day screening at the independent Showroom cinema in Sheffield, UK.

=== Home release ===
A Horrible Way to Die was released on DVD and Blu-ray Disc in the United States on September 6, 2011. Bonus materials include audio commentary with director/editor Adam Wingard and writer/producer Simon Barrett and a Behind The Scenes of A HORRIBLE WAY TO DIE featurette.

== Critical reception ==
The review-aggregation website Rotten Tomatoes reports a score of 60%, with an average rating of 6.4 out of 10, based on 10 reviews from critics. On Metacritic the film received "mixed or average" reviews, with an overall weighted average score of 52 out of 100, based on five critics. Dennis Harvey of Variety wrote that the film is "strongly reminiscent of Henry: Portrait of a Serial Killer" but lacks that film's impact. Jeannette Catsoulis of The New York Times called it "a restrained, ripely atmospheric thriller that relies more on mood than on special effects".
