= Monsterverse =

American kaiju media franchise

- Official franchise logo
- Created by: Legendary Pictures; Warner Bros. Pictures
- Original work: Godzilla (2014)
- Owner: Legendary Pictures (Note: Warner Bros. retains the rights to participate in sequels for Godzilla.)
- Years: 2014–present
- Based on: Godzilla by Toho Co., Ltd.; King Kong by Merian C. Cooper

Films and television
- Films: Godzilla (2014); Kong: Skull Island (2017); Godzilla: King of the Monsters (2019); Godzilla vs. Kong (2021); Godzilla x Kong: The New Empire (2024); Godzilla x Kong: Supernova (2027)
- Television series: Monarch: Legacy of Monsters (2023–present)
- Animated series: Skull Island (2023)

Audio
- Soundtracks: Godzilla; Kong: Skull Island; Godzilla: King of the Monsters; Godzilla vs. Kong; Godzilla x Kong: The New Empire

The Monsterverse (Note: Also stylized as MonsterVerse.) is an American multimedia franchise and shared universe featuring Godzilla and King Kong, as well as characters by Toho Co., Ltd and original characters. The franchise consists of five films and two television series produced by Legendary, with Warner Bros. Pictures distributing the films and the TV series being released for streaming on Netflix and Apple TV+.

The franchise has received a generally positive critical reception and has grossed $2.527 billion worldwide at the box office.

== Development ==
Writer Max Borenstein stated that the Monsterverse did not begin as a franchise but as an American reboot of Godzilla. Borenstein credits Legendary Entertainment's founder and then-CEO Thomas Tull as the one responsible for the Monsterverse, having acquired the rights to Godzilla and negotiated the complicated rights to King Kong. Tull had offered Borenstein the opportunity to write the first draft for Kong: Skull Island, with the goal to establish Kong in the same universe as Legendary's Godzilla film. Tull's vision was for the films to one day lead to Godzilla vs. Kong.

Legendary confirmed at the 2014 San Diego Comic-Con that it had acquired the licensing rights to Mothra, Rodan, and King Ghidorah from Toho Co., Ltd. and revealed concept footage with the closing title cards reading "Conflict: inevitable. Let them fight". In September 2015, Legendary announced that the film Kong: Skull Island would not be developed with Universal Pictures. Instead, it would be developed with Warner Bros., which sparked media speculation that Godzilla and Kong would appear in a film together.

In October 2015, Legendary announced plans to unite Godzilla and Kong in a film titled Godzilla vs. Kong, set for a 2020 release date. Legendary planned to create a shared cinematic franchise "centered around Monarch" (the secret government agency which debuted in 2014's Godzilla) and that "brings together Godzilla and Legendary's King Kong in an ecosystem of other giant super-species, both classic and new". Later in October, it was announced that Kong: Skull Island would have references to Monarch.

In May 2016, Warner Bros. announced that Godzilla vs. Kong would be released on May 29, 2020, later pushed back to May 21, 2021, and that Godzilla: King of the Monsters would be pushed back from its original June 8, 2018 release date to March 22, 2019, however the film was later pushed back again to May 31, 2019. In October 2016, Legendary announced that Godzilla: King of the Monsters would be filmed at its parent company Wanda's Oriental Movie Metropolis facility in Qingdao, China, along with Pacific Rim: Uprising. That same month, it was revealed that Legendary was planning a writers room to create their Godzilla–Kong cinematic universe, with Alex Garcia overseeing the project for Legendary.

In January 2017, Thomas Tull, founder of Legendary, resigned from the company but would remain as producer for the Godzilla–Kong series, which was revealed as the "Monsterverse". In March 2017, Legendary assembled a writers room led by Terry Rossio to develop the story for Godzilla vs. Kong.

Legendary's license to Godzilla expired in 2020, however it has since been renewed, as Toho announced in July 2022 that Godzilla would be featured in a sequel to Godzilla vs. Kong. In January 2022, Legendary announced plans for a live-action TV series centered on Godzilla and other Titans.

Per the contract between Toho and Legendary, the former is contractually prohibited from releasing Toho-produced Godzilla films in the same year that Legendary would release their own Godzilla films. The contract, however, does not extend to television; in 2021, Toho released the anime TV series Godzilla Singular Point a few weeks after Legendary released Godzilla vs. Kong, and in 2023, Toho released the film Godzilla Minus One in the same month that Legendary's Monarch: Legacy of Monsters was released.

On December 17, 2021, Summit Kaiju International filed a lawsuit against Legendary for copyright infringement, alleging that Legendary's character Methuselah was copied and renamed from their mascot Batholith. A judge denied Legendary's motion to dismiss the case, stating that Summit had provided enough evidence for similarities between both characters. In December 2022, the case was settled with Summit filing a "Notice of Voluntary Dismissal." Jeremy Allen Soles, the founder of Summit Kaiju International and the owner of X-Plus North America, was given an acknowledgment in the end credits of the 2024 film Godzilla x Kong: The New Empire.

== Films ==
Films of the Monsterverse
Film	U.S. release date	Director	Screenwriter(s)	Story by	Producers
Godzilla	May 16, 2014	Gareth Edwards	Max Borenstein	David Callaham	Thomas Tull, Jon Jashni, Mary Parent & Brian Rogers
Kong: Skull Island	March 10, 2017	Jordan Vogt-Roberts	Dan Gilroy, Max Borenstein & Derek Connolly	John Gatins	Thomas Tull, Jon Jashni, Mary Parent & Alex Garcia
Godzilla: King of the Monsters	May 31, 2019	Michael Dougherty	Michael Dougherty & Zach Shields	Max Borenstein, Michael Dougherty & Zach Shields	Thomas Tull, Jon Jashni, Mary Parent, Alex Garcia & Brian Rogers
Godzilla vs. Kong	March 31, 2021	Adam Wingard	Eric Pearson & Max Borenstein	Terry Rossio, Michael Dougherty & Zach Shields	Thomas Tull, Jon Jashni, Brian Rogers, Mary Parent, Alex Garcia & Eric McLeod
Godzilla x Kong: The New Empire	March 29, 2024	Adam Wingard	Terry Rossio, Simon Barrett & Jeremy Slater	Terry Rossio, Adam Wingard & Simon Barrett	Thomas Tull, Jon Jashni, Brian Rogers, Mary Parent, Alex Garcia & Eric McLeod
Godzilla x Kong: Supernova	March 26, 2027	Grant Sputore	David Callaham	David Callaham	Mary Parent, Thomas Tull, Alex Garcia & Jon Jashni

=== Godzilla (2014) ===
The film reimagines Godzilla's origins and is set 15 years after a nuclear meltdown in Japan which was caused by giant parasitic creatures, known as "MUTOs" (acronym for Massive Unidentified Terrestrial Organism). As two MUTOs ravage the countryside in order to reproduce, they awaken an even larger ancient alpha predator, known as "Godzilla", whose existence has been kept secret by the U.S. government since 1954. The film introduces Godzilla, the MUTOs, and the Monarch organization to the Monsterverse.

In 2004, director Yoshimitsu Banno acquired permission from Toho to produce a short IMAX Godzilla film which was in development for several years until the project was eventually turned over to Legendary Pictures. In March 2010, Legendary announced to have acquired the rights to Godzilla for a feature film reboot. In January 2011, Gareth Edwards was announced as the director for the film. The film was co-produced with Warner Bros. Pictures with filming completed in 2013 in Canada and the United States for release in 2014. Godzilla was released on May 16, 2014, to positive reviews, and was a box office success, grossing $529 million worldwide against a budget of $160 million.

=== Kong: Skull Island (2017) ===
Set in 1973, the film follows a team of scientists and Vietnam War soldiers traveling to an uncharted island in the Pacific where they encounter terrifying creatures and the mighty Kong. The film introduces Kong, the Mother Longlegs, the Sker Buffalo, the Mire Squid, the Leafwing, the Psychovulture, the Spore Mantis, the Skull Devil, and the Skullcrawlers to the Monsterverse and a post-credits scene introduces Rodan, Mothra, and King Ghidorah to the Monsterverse. The Skull Devil was originally trademarked as "Ramarak the Skullcrawler" until it was abandoned in September 2017.

In July 2014 at San Diego Comic-Con, Legendary announced a King Kong origin story, initially titled Skull Island, with a release date of November 4, 2016, and Universal Pictures distributing. In September 2014, Jordan Vogt-Roberts was announced as the film's director. In September 2015, Legendary moved development of the film from Universal Pictures to Warner Bros. to create an expanded cinematic universe. Principal photography began on October 19, 2015, in Hawaii and Vietnam. Kong: Skull Island was released on March 10, 2017, to positive reviews, and was a box office success, grossing $566 million worldwide against a budget of $185 million. The film received a nomination for Best Visual Effects at the 90th Academy Awards.

=== Godzilla: King of the Monsters (2019) ===
In the film, eco-terrorists release King Ghidorah, who awakens other monsters known as "Titans" across the world, forcing Godzilla and Mothra to surface and engage Ghidorah and Rodan in a decisive battle. The film changes the monsters' designation from "MUTOs" to "Titans". The film physically introduces Rodan, Mothra, and King Ghidorah and introduces Scylla, Methuselah, Behemoth, and the Queen MUTO to the Monsterverse; off-screen, the film introduces Baphomet, Typhon, Mokele-Mbembe, Tiamat, Abaddon, Leviathan, and Bunyip to the Monsterverse.

Prior to announcing a shared cinematic universe between Godzilla and Kong, Legendary originally intended to produce a Godzilla trilogy, with Gareth Edwards attached to direct all films. However, Edwards left the sequel in May 2016 to work on smaller scale projects. In January 2017, Michael Dougherty was announced as the director and co-writer for the film. Principal photography began in June 2017, in Atlanta, Georgia and wrapped in September 2017. The film was released on May 31, 2019, to mixed reviews, (Note: The Observer stated reviews were "mixed to negative". The Indian Express called reviews "largely negative." Screen Rant described responses as "so negative." Yahoo! Finance noted the reviews to be a "pretty mixed bag." Scott Mendelson from Forbes stated the film earned "mixed reviews", but later stated the film earned "mixed-negative reviews".) and was a box office disappointment, grossing $387 million worldwide against a budget between $170–200 million.

=== Godzilla vs. Kong (2021) ===
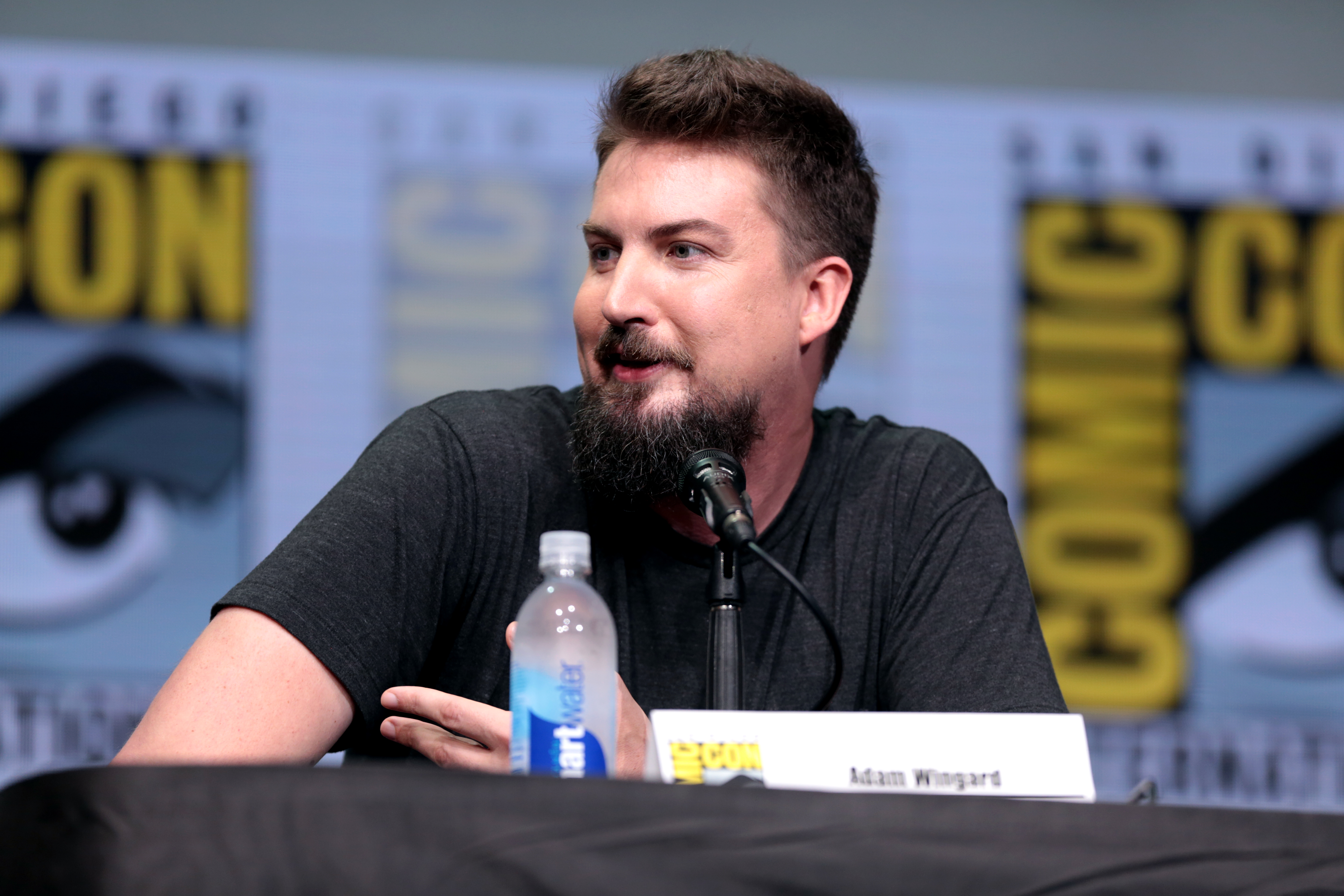
Adam Wingard (circa 2017) is the only director, so far, to direct two films in the Monsterverse: Godzilla vs. Kong and its sequel, Godzilla x Kong: The New Empire.

In the film, Kong clashes with Godzilla as humans lure the ape into the Hollow Earth to retrieve a power source for a weapon to stop Godzilla's mysterious rampages. The film introduces Mechagodzilla, the Warbat, the Hellhawk, and Titanus Doug to the Monsterverse.

The project was announced in October 2015 when Legendary announced plans for a shared cinematic universe between Godzilla and King Kong. The film's writers room was assembled in March 2017 and Adam Wingard was announced as the director in May 2017. Principal photography began in November 2018 in Hawaii and Australia and concluded in April 2019. After being delayed from a November 2020 release date due to the COVID-19 pandemic, the film was theatrically released internationally on March 24, 2021, and was released in the United States on March 31, 2021, where it was released simultaneously in theaters and on HBO Max. The film received generally positive reviews and was a box office success, breaking pandemic records and grossing $470 million. It was also a streaming hit, becoming the most successful launch item in HBO Max's history until it was overtaken by Mortal Kombat.

=== Godzilla x Kong: The New Empire (2024) ===
Godzilla and Kong reunite against an undiscovered threat hidden deep within the Earth that challenges the existence of humans and Titans alike. The film introduces the Skar King, Suko, and Shimo to the Monsterverse.

Following the box office and streaming success of Godzilla vs. Kong during the COVID-19 pandemic, Legendary announced a sequel in March 2022 and that filming would commence later in the year in Gold Coast, Queensland and other locations in South East Queensland. In May 2022, it was announced that Wingard would return to direct and that Dan Stevens had been cast as the lead. Wingard and Stevens had previously worked together on The Guest. The film was theatrically released internationally on March 27, 2024, and in the United States on March 29, 2024. The film is Kaylee Hottle's final film performance prior to her death in 2026.

=== Godzilla x Kong: Supernova (2027) ===
In March 2024, prior to the release of Godzilla x Kong: The New Empire, Wingard expressed interest in returning to direct a third film featuring Godzilla and Kong, but noted that "it just depends on how Godzilla x Kong: The New Empire does and how things kind of shape out." In April 2024, following the release and successful response to The New Empire, producer and Legendary's chairman of worldwide production Mary Parent commented on the film's box office success: "This is certainly an exciting result. We are in a good position to continue the journey, but let's see how Godzilla x Kong unfolds."

On May 10, 2024, Legendary announced that a follow-up to Godzilla x Kong: The New Empire has entered development and would be written by David Callaham, who wrote the early drafts to Godzilla (2014) The following week, Legendary announced that Wingard would not return to direct due to scheduling conflicts, but had expressed interest in having Wingard return. In June 2024, Legendary announced Grant Sputore (director of I Am Mother) as the new director and that the film would be released on March 26, 2027. Pre-production began in January 2025, with performers being cast such as Kaitlyn Dever, Jack O'Connell, Delroy Lindo, Dan Stevens (reprises his role from the previous film), Matthew Modine, Alycia Debnam-Carey, and Sam Neill.

In November 2025, feature writing credits published by the Writers Guild of America revealed that SpaceGodzilla would be featured in the film.

=== Future ===
In October 2017, Steven S. DeKnight (director and co-writer of Pacific Rim Uprising) noted that there have been discussions about a cross-over between the Monsterverse and Pacific Rim franchise, however, he iterated it was all hypothetical possibilities. Guillermo del Toro (director and co-writer of Pacific Rim) had also expressed interest in Pacific Rim crossing over with the Monsterverse. In March 2019, when asked about the future of the Monsterverse, Garcia stated, "It's one brick at a time, each piece has to be as good as it can be, so right now it's all focused on this [Godzilla: King of the Monsters and Godzilla vs. Kong]. But could there be? Yeah, that's the hope if the movies turn out really well."

In February 2021, Wingard stated, "I know where we could go potentially with future films." However, he noted that the Monsterverse was created "to a certain degree" to lead towards Godzilla vs. Kong. Wingard added that the Monsterverse is at a "crossroads", stating, "It's really at the point where audiences have to kind of step forward and vote for more of these things. If this movie is a success obviously they will continue forward."

In April 2024, Legendary announced that under their new contract with Apple TV (at that time Apple TV+) they will proceed with a second season of Monarch: Legacy of Monsters, as well as multiple spin-off series. The following month, Legendary announced that development has commenced on a sequel to Godzilla x Kong: The New Empire, with Grant Sputore directing and slated for March 26, 2027. In October 2024, it was announced that a sequel to the cross-over comic series Justice League vs. Godzilla vs. Kong would be released in 2025. In March 2025, Legendary Comics announced a partnership with Titan Comics to expand Skull Island into a comic series titled Return to Skull Island. The first issues of Return to Skull Island and Justice League vs. Godzilla vs. Kong 2 were released on June 4, 2025.

In December 2025, Legendary and Apple TV announced plans for a spin-off series focused on young Lee Shaw, with Wyatt Russell to reprise the role. The series will be set in 1984 and follow Shaw as he attempts to stop the Soviet Union from unleashing a new Titan on the U.S. Joby Harold, who oversees the Monsterverse on the Apple TV side, was named the series' showrunner. The series is also to feature Godzilla, with Hiro Matsuoka and Takemasa Arita serving as executive producers on behalf of Toho.

== Television ==
Series	Season	Episodes	Originally released			Showrunner	Status
Series	Season	Episodes	First released	Last released	Network	Showrunner	Status
Skull Island	1	8	June 22, 2023	June 22, 2023	Netflix	Brian Duffield	Concluded
Monarch: Legacy of Monsters	1	10	November 17, 2023	January 12, 2024	Apple TV+	Chris Black	Released
Monarch: Legacy of Monsters	2	10	February 27, 2026	May 1, 2026	Apple TV	Chris Black	Released

=== Skull Island (2023) ===
In January 2021, Legendary Television and Netflix announced plans for animated series titled Skull Island. The project is developed and written by Brian Duffield, who also serves as co-executive producer with Jacob Robinson. Produced by Powerhouse Animation, JP and Legendary Television, the series was released worldwide on Netflix on June 22, 2023. The series introduces Annie's Dog and the Kraken to the Monsterverse, as well as other unnamed monsters.

In October 2023, Duffield stated that the script for the second season had been completed; while creatives were waiting for an official season two renewal green-lighting from Netflix.

=== Monarch: Legacy of Monsters (2023–present) ===
In January 2022, Legendary announced that Apple TV (at that time Apple TV+) had ordered a live-action series featuring Godzilla and other Titans, with Chris Black serving as showrunner; Black and Matt Fraction serve as co-creators and executive producers. Produced by Safehouse Pictures, Toho Co., Ltd., Mikfred Criminal Masterminds, Chris Black Broadcasting System and Legendary Television, the series premiered on November 17, 2023, on Apple TV and consists of 10 episodes.

In April 2024, the series was renewed for a second season. Photos on social media verified that principal photography on the second season began in July 2024. In November 2025, Legendary and Apple TV made several announcements, including that Kurt Russell would return for season two, and a teaser trailer revealing Kong's involvement, and the series' February 2026 airdate.

The series debuts new monsters to the franchise: the first season introduces the Ion Dragon and Frost Vark, while the second season introduces Titan X.

== Cast and characters ==
List indicators

This section includes characters who will appear or have appeared in the billing block of at least one film in the series.

- An empty grey cell indicates the character was not in the film, or that the character's official presence has not yet been confirmed.
- ^{O} indicates an older version of the character.
- ^{S} indicates an appearance through use of special effects.
- ^{Y} indicates a younger version of the character.

Character	Films						Television series	
Character	Godzilla	Kong: Skull Island	Godzilla: King of the Monsters	Godzilla vs. Kong	Godzilla x Kong: The New Empire	Godzilla x Kong: Supernova	Skull Island	Monarch: Legacy of Monsters
Character	2014	2017	2019	2021	2024	2027	2023	2023–present
Monsters
Godzilla	T. J. Storm^{S}	Pictured with audio	T. J. Storm^{S}	CGI	CGI	CGI		CGI
MUTO	Matt Cross^{S} Lee Ross^{S}		CGI	Archive footage				
Kong		Terry Notary^{S} Toby Kebbell^{S}	Archive footage	Allan Henry^{S} Eric Petey^{S}	Allan Henry^{S}	CGI	Animation	CGI
King Ghidorah		Pictured	Jason Liles^{S} Alan Maxson^{S} Richard Dorton^{S}	Archive footage				
Rodan		Pictured	Jason Liles^{S}	Archive footage				CGI
Skar King					Allan Henry^{S}			
Suko					Luke Hawker^{S}			
Humans
Ishiro Serizawa	Ken Watanabe		Ken Watanabe					
Vivienne Graham	Sally Hawkins		Sally Hawkins					
William Stentz	David Strathairn		David Strathairn					
Ford Brody	Aaron Taylor-Johnson CJ Adams^{Y}							
Elle Brody	Elizabeth Olsen							
Joe Brody	Bryan Cranston							
Sandra Brody	Juliette Binoche							
Houston Brooks		Corey Hawkins^{Y}	Joe Morton^{O}					
William Randa		John Goodman		Pictured and archive audio				Anders Holm^{Y} John Goodman^{O}
James Conrad		Tom Hiddleston						
Hank Marlow		John C. Reilly Will Brittain^{Y}						
Mason Weaver		Brie Larson						
Preston Packard		Samuel L. Jackson						
San Lin		Jing Tian						
Mark Russell			Kyle Chandler	Kyle Chandler				
Madison Russell			Millie Bobby Brown Alexandra Rabe^{Y}	Millie Bobby Brown				
Emma Russell			Vera Farmiga	Pictured				
Ilene and Ling Chen			Zhang Ziyi					
Rick Stanton			Bradley Whitford					
Sam Coleman			Thomas Middleditch					
Alan Jonah			Charles Dance					
Diane Foster			Aisha Hinds					
Jackson Barnes			O'Shea Jackson Jr.					
Nathan Lind				Alexander Skarsgård				
Ilene Andrews				Rebecca Hall	Rebecca Hall			
Jia				Kaylee Hottle	Kaylee Hottle			
Bernie Hayes				Brian Tyree Henry	Brian Tyree Henry			
Josh Valentine				Julian Dennison				
Walter Simmons				Demián Bichir				
Ren Serizawa				Shun Oguri				
Maia Simmons				Eiza González				
Guillermin				Lance Reddick				
Travis "Trapper" Beasley					Dan Stevens	Dan Stevens		
Mikael					Alex Ferns			
Iwi Queen					Fala Chen			
Hampton					Rachel House			
TBA						Kaitlyn Dever		
TBA						Jack O'Connell		
TBA						Delroy Lindo		
TBA						Matthew Modine		
TBA						Alycia Debnam-Carey		
TBA						Sam Neill		
Annie							Mae Whitman	
Charlie							Nicolas Cantu	
Mike							Darren Barnet	
Cap							Benjamin Bratt	
Irene							Betty Gilpin	
Cate Randa								Anna Sawai
Kentaro Randa								Ren Watabe
May Olowe-Hewitt								Kiersey Clemons
Tim								Joe Tippett
Duvall								Elisa Lasowski
Lee Shaw								Kurt Russell Wyatt Russell^{Y}
Keiko Miura								Mari Yamamoto
Puckett								Christopher Heyerdahl

== Reception ==
=== Box office performance ===
Film	Box office grosses			Budget	Ref.
Film	Domestic	International	Worldwide	Budget	Ref.
Godzilla	$200,676,069	$328,400,000	$529,076,069	$160 million	
Kong: Skull Island	$168,052,812	$400,600,000	$568,652,812	$185 million	
Godzilla: King of the Monsters	$110,500,138	$276,800,000	$387,300,138	$170–200 million (Note: Entertainment Weekly, Box Office Mojo, and Deadline Hollywood reported that the film's production budget was $170 million; however, Deadline also noted that other analysts marked the budget at $185 million. In July 2018, the Hindustan Times reported the budget to be $200 million. This figure was also echoed by Variety in June 2019.)	
Godzilla vs. Kong	$100,916,094	$369,200,000	$470,116,094	$155–200 million (Note: The Numbers reported the production budget to be $155 million. In December 2020, Variety reported the budget to be $160 million, while TheWrap reported the budget to be $165 million. In January 2021, both The Hollywood Reporter and Deadline Hollywood stated the budget to be $200 million. In February 2021, Comingsoon.net also noted the film's budget to be $200 million.)	
Godzilla x Kong: The New Empire	$196,350,016	$375,500,000	$572,050,016	$135–150 million (Note: Attributed to multiple sources.)	
Totals	$776,495,129	$1,750,500,000	$2,527,195,129	$805–880 million	

=== Critical and public response ===
Film	Critical		Public	
Film	Rotten Tomatoes	Metacritic	CinemaScore	PostTrak
Godzilla	76% (328 reviews)	62 (48 reviews)	B+	—N/a
Kong: Skull Island	75% (390 reviews)	62 (49 reviews)	B+	80%
Godzilla: King of the Monsters	42% (350 reviews)	48 (46 reviews)	B+	85%
Godzilla vs. Kong	75% (391 reviews)	59 (57 reviews)	A	86%
Godzilla x Kong: The New Empire	54% (251 reviews)	47 (51 reviews)	A−	96%

Television	Rotten Tomatoes	Metacritic
Skull Island	82% (17 reviews)	51 (4 reviews)
Monarch: Legacy of Monsters (Season 1)	86% (86 reviews)	68 (26 reviews)
Monarch: Legacy of Monsters (Season 2)	76% (33 reviews)	67 (11 reviews)

== Music ==
Title	U.S. release date	Length	Composer	Label
Godzilla (Original Motion Picture Soundtrack)	May 13, 2014	1:00:27	Alexandre Desplat	WaterTower Music
Kong: Skull Island (Original Motion Picture Soundtrack)	March 3, 2017	56:56	Henry Jackman	WaterTower Music
Godzilla: King of the Monsters (Original Motion Picture Soundtrack)	May 24, 2019	1:38:00	Bear McCreary	WaterTower Music
Godzilla vs. Kong (Original Motion Picture Soundtrack)	March 26, 2021	1:07:09	Tom Holkenborg	WaterTower Music
Skull Island (Soundtrack from the Netflix Series)	June 22, 2023	1:01:00	Joseph Trapanese & Jason Lazarus	Milan
Monarch: Legacy of Monsters (Apple TV+ Original Series Soundtrack)	November 17, 2023	40:00	Leopold Ross	Milan
Godzilla x Kong: The New Empire (Original Motion Picture Soundtrack)	March 22, 2024	1:04:00	Tom Holkenborg & Antonio Di Iorio	WaterTower Music
Monarch: Legacy of Monsters –Season 2 (Apple TV Original Series Soundtrack)	February 27, 2026	44:00	Leopold Ross	Milan

For Godzilla (2014), Alexandre Desplat was announced as the film's composer in August 2013. Director Gareth Edwards chose Desplat after creating a music playlist, stating, "I dragged and dropped all my favorite soundtracks, and the person who got high score was Alexandre Desplat." Desplat accepted the job because he was impressed with Edwards' directorial debut Monsters (2010) and had never composed a monster film, adding that he always attempted to accept disparate films. Desplat had organized a large orchestra that he described as "stupidly big, as big as Godzilla". He explained that the orchestra had to be big in order to avoid filling gaps in the score with electronics. Desplat had described his score as "non-stop fortissimo, with lots of brass, Japanese drums, and electric violin". He echoed the film's Japanese origins and influence by applying a shakuhachi bamboo flute and taiko drums throughout the score. While the themes by Akira Ifukube, composer of various Godzilla films, were not used for the film, Edwards likened Desplat's score as "very much in the same tone of Akira". However, Desplat paid homage to Ifukube during the track "Godzilla!" by flaring the brass to reflect sounds similar to Ifukube's themes.

For Kong: Skull Island (2017), Henry Jackman blended 1970s psychedelic guitars into the score, which was considered to be a combination of mixing electronic sounds with symphony orchestra. Jackman stated that "The great thing about a monster movie is that it opens the door to use the symphony orchestra in its most sumptuous way. [Director] Jordan Vogt-Roberts was happy to celebrate the gravity and history that comes with a full orchestra, but we also explored less traditional elements. That's a field day for a composer". Vogt-Roberts also used rock music from the Vietnam-era and hits from the 70s, stating, "this provides a striking dichotomy, sets the tone and gives us great moments of fun".

For Godzilla: King of the Monsters (2019), it was announced during Comic-Con 2018 that Bear McCreary would compose the score and utilize Ifukube's themes and Yūji Koseki's Mothra theme. He chose to adapt Ifukube and Koseki's themes to form a "connection between Ifukube's uniquely brilliant style and the aesthetics of modern blockbusters". For the film's soundtrack, McCreary produced a cover of Blue Öyster Cult's "Godzilla", that featured Serj Tankian on vocals, as well as Brendon Small, Gene Hoglan, and other members of Dethklok contributing to the cover. McCreary described the cover as "the most audacious piece of music" he had produced in his career.

For Godzilla vs. Kong (2021), Tom Holkenborg was announced as the film's composer in June 2020. During a meeting in 2018, Holkenborg admitted to director Adam Wingard to being a Godzilla fan and had composed a Godzilla theme recreationally. Wingard chose not to recycle Ifukube's theme, feeling it was "insincere" since he associated them with Toho's Godzilla. Instead, Wingard wanted to use new themes that embraced the Monsterverse's Godzilla while honoring its influences. Holkenborg requested a bass drum roughly ten feet in diameter, but the builder was only able to scale it down to eight feet. He wanted to create a Godzilla theme that "lived and breathed" the history behind monster themes and that was slow and sluggish to reflect Godzilla. Lower brass and big tympanis were used to underscore Godzilla's power. For Kong's theme, Holkenborg used an "organic approach". The sound was interwoven with electronic and sound design elements. The score began with melody and "got colors and orchestration and different types of electronic instruments with it".

For Godzilla x Kong: The New Empire (2024), Tom Holkenborg was announced to return to compose the film's score in August 2022, after previously doing so for Godzilla vs. Kong. In December 2023, it was announced that Antonio Di Iorio would co-compose the score with Holkenborg. A single was released on March 13, 2024, by WaterTower Music, titled "Main Title Theme". The full soundtrack album was released on March 22, 2024.

== Other media ==
=== Books ===
Title	Release date	Writer	Note
Godzilla: The Art of Destruction	May 13, 2014	Mark Cotta	The making of Godzilla
Godzilla – The Official Movie Novelization	May 20, 2014	Greg Cox	Novelization of Godzilla
Kong: Skull Island – The Official Movie Novelization	March 14, 2017	Tim Lebbon	Novelization of Kong: Skull Island
The Art and Making of Kong: Skull Island	March 21, 2017	Simon Ward	The making of Kong: Skull Island
Godzilla: King of the Monsters – The Official Movie Novelization	May 31, 2019	Gregory Keyes	Novelization of Godzilla: King of the Monsters
The Art of Godzilla: King of the Monsters	June 4, 2019	Abbie Bernstein	The making of Godzilla: King of the Monsters
Kong and Me	March 30, 2021	Kiki Thorpe	Picture book prequel to Godzilla vs. Kong
Godzilla vs. Kong: The Official Movie Novelization	April 6, 2021	Gregory Keyes	Novelization of Godzilla vs. Kong
Godzilla vs. Kong: Sometimes Friends Fight (But They Always Make Up)	April 6, 2021	Carol Herring	Picture book to Godzilla vs. Kong
Godzilla vs. Kong: The Art of the Ultimate Battle Royale	May 21, 2021	Daniel Wallace	The making of Godzilla vs. Kong
Godzilla x Kong: The New Empire - The Official Movie Novelization	April 23, 2024	Gregory Keyes	Novelization of Godzilla x Kong: The New Empire

=== Comics ===
Title	Release date	Writer(s)	Illustrator(s)	Cover artist(s)	Note
Godzilla: Awakening	May 7, 2014	Max Borenstein and Greg Borenstein	Eric Battle, Yvel Guichet, Alan Quah, and Lee Loughridge	Arthur Adams	Tie-in prequel graphic novel to Godzilla
Skull Island: The Birth of Kong #1	April 12, 2017	Arvid Nelson	Zid	Zid	Tie-in prequel/sequel comic to Kong: Skull Island
Skull Island: The Birth of Kong #2	June 28, 2017	Arvid Nelson	Zid	Zid	Tie-in prequel/sequel comic to Kong: Skull Island
Skull Island: The Birth of Kong #3	September 27, 2017	Arvid Nelson	Zid	Zid	Tie-in prequel/sequel comic to Kong: Skull Island
Skull Island: The Birth of Kong #4	November 22, 2017	Arvid Nelson	Zid	Drew Johnson	Tie-in prequel/sequel comic to Kong: Skull Island
Godzilla: Aftershock	May 21, 2019	Arvid Nelson	Drew Edward Johnson	Christopher Shy, Arthur Adams	Tie-in prequel graphic novel to Godzilla: King of the Monsters
Kingdom Kong	April 6, 2021	Marie Anello	Zid	Zid	Tie-in prequel graphic novel to Godzilla vs. Kong
Godzilla Dominion	April 6, 2021	Greg Keyes	Drew Edward Johnson	Drew Edward Johnson	Tie-in prequel graphic novel to Godzilla vs. Kong
Justice League vs. Godzilla vs. Kong #1	October 17, 2023	Brian Buccellato	Christian Duce	Drew Johnson, Romulo Fajaroo Jr	Crossover with the DC Comics team Justice League
Justice League vs. Godzilla vs. Kong #2	November 21, 2023	Brian Buccellato	Christian Duce	Drew Johnson	Crossover with the DC Comics team Justice League
Justice League vs. Godzilla vs. Kong #3	December 19, 2023	Brian Buccellato	Christian Duce	Drew Johnson, Romulo Fajaroo Jr	Crossover with the DC Comics team Justice League
Justice League vs. Godzilla vs. Kong #4	January 16, 2024	Brian Buccellato	Christian Duce, Tom Derenick	Drew Johnson, Romulo Fajaroo Jr	Crossover with the DC Comics team Justice League
Justice League vs. Godzilla vs. Kong #5	February 20, 2024	Brian Buccellato	Christian Duce	Drew Johnson	Crossover with the DC Comics team Justice League
Godzilla x Kong: The Hunted	March 12, 2024	Brian Buccellato	Drew Johnson, Dario Formisani, Zid	David Aja	Tie-in prequel graphic novel to Godzilla x Kong: The New Empire
Justice League vs. Godzilla vs. Kong #6	March 19, 2024	Brian Buccellato	Christian Duce	Drew Johnson	Crossover with the DC Comics team Justice League
Justice League vs. Godzilla vs. Kong #7	May 21, 2024	Brian Buccellato	Christian Duce	Drew Johnson	Crossover with the DC Comics team Justice League
Monsterverse Declassified	May 13, 2025	Greg Keyes, Daniel J. Park, Rosie Knight, David M. Booher	David Ferracci, Marco Roblin, Oliver Ono, Drew Zucker		Anthology graphic novel of four Monsterverse Titans
Justice League vs. Godzilla vs. Kong 2 #1	June 4, 2025	Brian Buccellato	Christian Duce (Note: Variant covers by Alan Quah, Dan Mora, John Giang, Gabriel Hardman, Kevin Maguire, and Carlos D'Anda; Colors by Luis Guerrero)		Sequel to Justice League vs. Godzilla vs. Kong
Justice League vs. Godzilla vs. Kong 2 #2	July 2, 2025	Brian Buccellato	Christian Duce (Note: Variant covers by Alan Quah, Yasmine Putri, Stephen Segovia, Lucas Meyer, and Kevin Maguire; Colors by Luis Guerrero)		Sequel to Justice League vs. Godzilla vs. Kong
Return to Skull Island #1	July 9, 2025	Simon Furman	Christopher Jones	InHyuk Lee and Christopher Jones	Comic sequel to Skull Island
Justice League vs. Godzilla vs. Kong 2 #3	August 6, 2025	Brian Buccellato	Christian Duce (Note: Variant covers by Riccardo Federici, Alan Quah, and Kevin Maguire; Colors by Luis Guerrero)		Sequel to Justice League vs. Godzilla vs. Kong
Return to Skull Island #2	August 6, 2025	Simon Furman	Christopher Jones	The Knott, Christopher Jones and Diego Yapur	Comic sequel to Skull Island
Justice League vs. Godzilla vs. Kong 2 #4	September 3, 2025	Brian Buccellato	Christian Duce (Note: Variant covers by Luis Guerrero, Stephen Segovia, Rain Beredo, Alan Quah, Kevin Maguire, Rosemary Cheetham; Colors by Luis Guerrero)		Sequel to Justice League vs. Godzilla vs. Kong
Return to Skull Island #3	September 10, 2025	Simon Furman	Christopher Jones	Takeshi Miyazawa, Christopher Jones and Pham Chuong	Comic sequel to Skull Island
Return to Skull Island #4	October 15, 2025	Simon Furman	Christopher Jones	Staz Johnson, Christopher Jones and Marcello Costa	Comic sequel to Skull Island
Justice League vs. Godzilla vs. Kong 2 #5	November 26, 2025	Brian Buccellato	Christian Duce (Note: Variant covers by Luis Guerrero, Lucas Meyer, Alan Quah, Kevin Macguire, and Rosemary Cheetham; Colors by Luis Guerrero)		Sequel to Justice League vs. Godzilla vs. Kong
Justice League vs. Godzilla vs. Kong 2 #6	December 24, 2025	Brian Buccellato	Christian Duce (Note: Variant covers by Luis Guerrero, Carlo Pagulayan, Jazon Paz, Romulo Fajardo Jr., Alan Quah, Kevin Macguire, and Rosemary Cheetham; Colors by Luis Guerrero)		Sequel to Justice League vs. Godzilla vs. Kong
Justice League vs. Godzilla vs. Kong 2 #7	January 28, 2026	Brian Buccellato	Christian Duce (Note: Variant covers by Alan Quah, Carmine Di Giandeomanico, and Kevin Maguire; Colors by Luis Guerrero)		Sequel to Justice League vs. Godzilla vs. Kong

Collected editions
Title	Release date	Cover artist	Note
Skull Island: The Birth of Kong	December 12, 2017	Zid	Collects all four issues
Monsterverse Titanthology Vol. 1	June 22, 2021	Arther Adams	Compilation of Skull Island: The Birth of Kong and Godzilla: Aftershock
Legends of the Monsterverse	August 16, 2023 (Kickstarter) March 5, 2024 (general)	Zid (Kickstarter) Jonathan Marks Barravecchia (general)	Hardcover collection of Godzilla: Awakening, Skull Island: The Birth of Kong, Godzilla: Aftershock, Kingdom Kong, Godzilla Dominion. Also includes a new story, "Godzilla: Fight or Flight", which ties-in to Godzilla vs. Kong and was written by Brian Buccellato and illustrated by Zid.
Justice League vs. Godzilla vs. Kong	June 25, 2024	Dan Mora	Hardcover collection of all seven issues

=== Video games ===
Legendary's Godzilla was featured as a playable character in Bandai Namco's 2014 video game Godzilla as "Hollywood Godzilla". In 2017, a short virtual reality experience titled Kong VR: Destination Skull Island was made available at 1500 Samsung retail demo locations, in 15 AMC theater locations, and Samsung VR stores. Godzilla and Kong were featured in cross-over events for PUBG Mobile, World of Warships, Godzilla: Battle Line, Call of Duty: Warzone, and Fortnite (which also featured Mechagodzilla). For Godzilla x Kong: The New Empire, Legendary and Warner Bros. collaborated with Roblox for an interactive trailer via the "obby" that users can interface with characters from the film.

Title	Release date	Developer	Publisher	Note	Ref.
Godzilla: Crisis Defense	May 7, 2014	Legendary	Legendary	Tie-in web game to Godzilla	
Godzilla: Strike Zone	May 15, 2014	Warner Bros. Entertainment	Warner Bros. International Enterprises	Tie-in mobile game to Godzilla	
Godzilla: Smash 3	May 16, 2014	Rogue Play	Pipeworks	Tie-in mobile game to Godzilla	
Godzilla x Kong: Titan Chasers	2024	Hunted Cow Studios	Tilting Point	Tie-in mobile game to Godzilla x Kong: The New Empire	
Kong: Survivor Instinct	2024	7Levels	Legendary	Tie-in platform game to Godzilla vs. Kong	

== See also ==
- Godzilla (franchise)
- King Kong (franchise)
- Kaiju
