= List of accolades received by The Tragedy of Macbeth (2021 film) =

The Tragedy of Macbeth awards and nominations
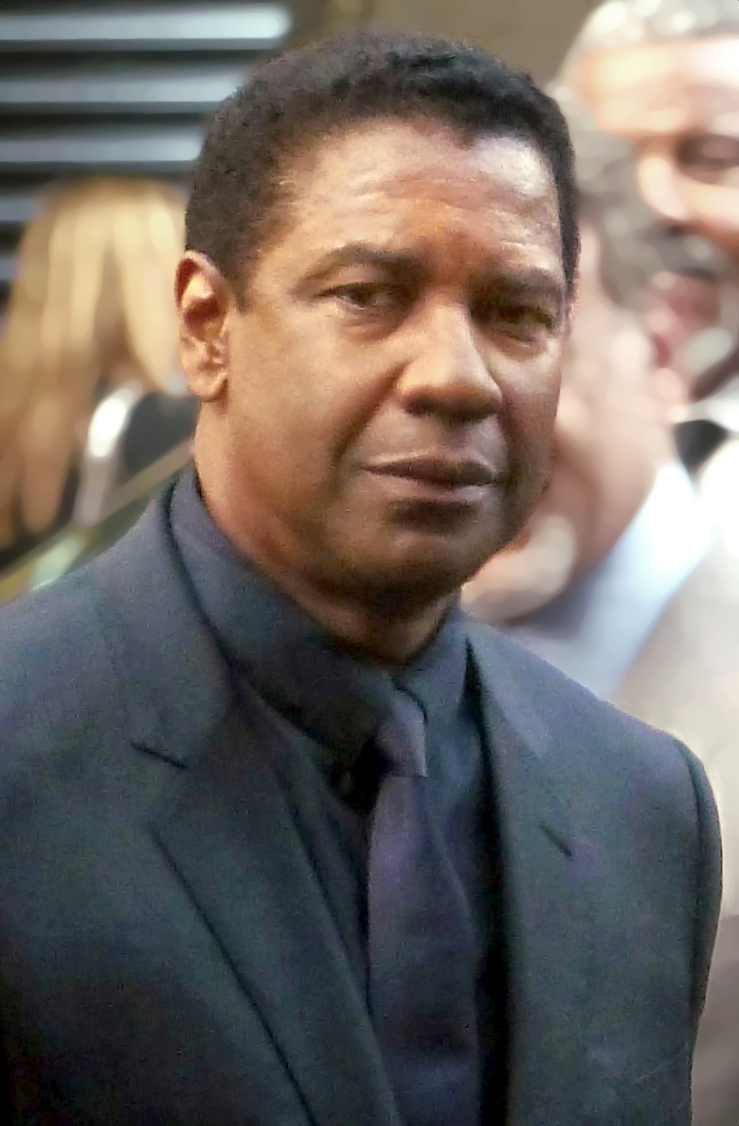
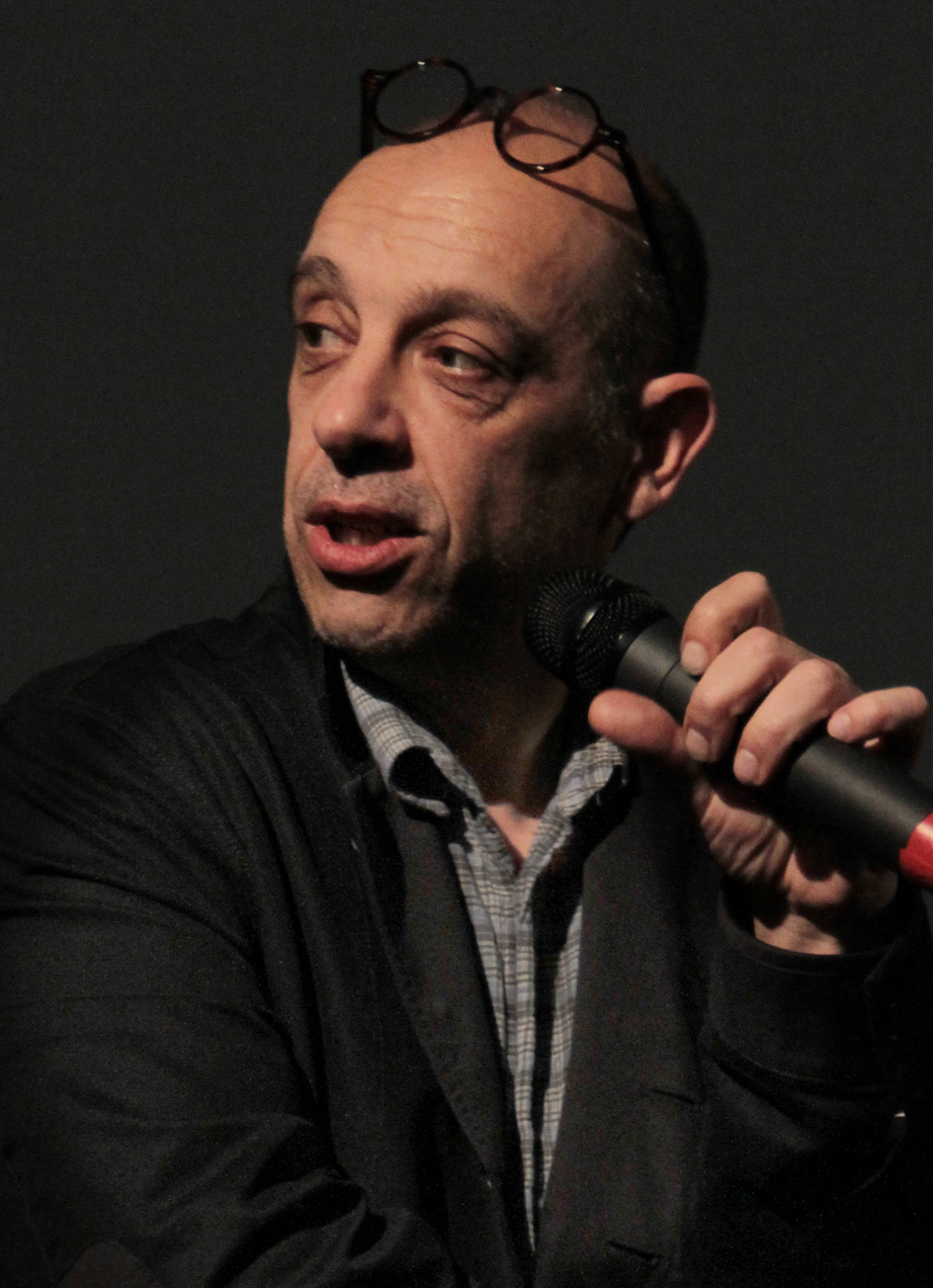
- Denzel Washington's performance and Bruno Delbonnel's cinematography garnered acclaim and earned Academy Award nominations for Best Actor and Best Cinematography, respectively.
Awards and nominations
Award	Wins	Nominations
AACTA International Awards	0	1
AARP Movies for Grownups Awards	0	3
Academy Awards	0	3
African-American Film Critics Association Awards	1	2
Alliance of Women Film Journalists Awards	0	2
American Film Institute Awards	1	1
American Society of Cinematographers Awards	0	1
Art Directors Guild Awards	0	1
Austin Film Critics Association Awards	0	3
Black Reel Awards	2	5
British Academy Film Awards	0	1
Camerimage	1	2
Chicago Film Critics Association Awards	0	1
Critics' Choice Movie Awards	0	2
Dallas–Fort Worth Film Critics Association Awards	0	1
Dublin Film Critics' Circle Awards	1	1
Georgia Film Critics Association Awards	0	3
Golden Globe Awards	0	1
Golden Reel Awards	0	1
Hollywood Music in Media Awards	0	1
Houston Film Critics Society Awards	0	3
IndieWire Critics Poll	1	1
International Cinephile Society Awards	0	1
NAACP Image Awards	0	1
National Board of Review	3	3
New York Film Critics Circle Awards	1	1
Online Film Critics Society Awards	0	1
San Diego Film Critics Society Awards	0	2
San Francisco Bay Area Film Critics Circle Awards	1	3
Satellite Awards	1	4
Screen Actors Guild Awards	0	1
Seattle Film Critics Society Awards	0	1
Set Decorators Society of America Awards	0	1
St. Louis Film Critics Association	2	5
Toronto Film Critics Association Awards	1	1
USC Scripter Awards	0	1
Vancouver Film Critics Circle Awards	0	1
Visual Effects Society Awards	0	1
Washington D.C. Area Film Critics Association Awards	0	2
Women Film Critics Circle Awards	1	1

Totals (Note: Certain award groups do not simply award one winner. They acknowledge several different recipients, have runners-up, and have third place. Since this is a specific recognition and is different from losing an award, runner-up mentions are considered wins in this award tally. For simplification and to avoid errors, each award in this list has been presumed to have had a prior nomination.)
- Wins: 19
- Nominations: 111

The Tragedy of Macbeth is an American black-and-white film written and directed by Joel Coen, based on the play Macbeth by William Shakespeare. It is the first film directed by one of the Coen brothers without the other's involvement. It stars Denzel Washington, Frances McDormand, Bertie Carvel, Alex Hassell, Corey Hawkins, Harry Melling, and Brendan Gleeson. In the film, the Three Witches tell Macbeth a prophecy that he will become the King of Scotland. Kathryn Hunter co-stars, playing all three witches and an old man.

The Tragedy of Macbeth was released in select theaters by A24 on December 25, 2021, and began streaming on Apple TV+ on January 14, 2022. The film was critically acclaimed, with praise aimed towards Coen's screenplay and direction, Bruno Delbonnel's cinematography, the production design and score, and the performances of Washington and Hunter. The American Film Institute and National Board of Review listed it among the best films of 2021. Washington was nominated for a Golden Globe and Delbonnel received a BAFTA Award nomination for Best Cinematography. At the 94th Academy Awards, the film received nominations for Best Actor (Washington), Best Production Design (Stefan Dechant and Nancy Haigh), and Best Cinematography (Delbonnel).

== Accolades ==
Accolades received by The Tragedy of Macbeth
Award	Date of ceremony	Category	Recipient(s)	Result	Ref.
AACTA International Awards	January 26, 2022	Best Actor	Denzel Washington	Nominated	
AARP Movies for Grownups Awards	March 18, 2022	Best Actor	Denzel Washington	Nominated	
AARP Movies for Grownups Awards	March 18, 2022	Best Actress	Frances McDormand	Nominated	
AARP Movies for Grownups Awards	March 18, 2022	Best Grownup Love Story	The Tragedy of Macbeth	Nominated	
Academy Awards	March 27, 2022	Best Actor	Denzel Washington	Nominated	
Academy Awards	March 27, 2022	Best Production Design	Stefan Dechant, Nancy Haigh	Nominated	
Academy Awards	March 27, 2022	Best Cinematography	Bruno Delbonnel	Nominated	
African-American Film Critics Association Awards	January 17, 2022	Best Picture	The Tragedy of Macbeth	Nominated	
African-American Film Critics Association Awards	January 17, 2022	Best Supporting Actor	Corey Hawkins	Won	
Alliance of Women Film Journalists Awards	January 25, 2022	Best Actor	Denzel Washington	Nominated	
Alliance of Women Film Journalists Awards	January 25, 2022	Best Cinematography	Bruno Delbonnel	Nominated	
American Film Institute Awards	March 11, 2022	Top 10 Films	The Tragedy of Macbeth	Won	
American Society of Cinematographers Awards	March 20, 2022	Outstanding Achievement in Cinematography in Theatrical Releases	Bruno Delbonnel	Nominated	
Art Directors Guild Awards	March 5, 2022	Excellence in Production Design for a Period Film	Stefan Dechant	Nominated	
Austin Film Critics Association Awards	January 11, 2022	Best Actor	Denzel Washington	Nominated	
Austin Film Critics Association Awards	January 11, 2022	Best Supporting Actress	Kathryn Hunter	Nominated	
Austin Film Critics Association Awards	January 11, 2022	Best Cinematography	Bruno Delbonnel	Nominated	
Black Reel Awards	February 28, 2022	Outstanding Film	The Tragedy of Macbeth (Note: Nominees: Joel Coen, Frances McDormand, Robert Graf)	Nominated	
Black Reel Awards	February 28, 2022	Outstanding Actor	Denzel Washington	Nominated	
Black Reel Awards	February 28, 2022	Outstanding Cinematography	Bruno Delbonnel	Won	
Black Reel Awards	February 28, 2022	Outstanding Costume Design	Mary Zophres	Nominated	
Black Reel Awards	February 28, 2022	Outstanding Production Design	Stefan Dechant	Won	
British Academy Film Awards	March 13, 2022	Best Cinematography	Bruno Delbonnel	Nominated	
Camerimage	November 20, 2021	Gold Frog (Main Competition)	Bruno Delbonnel, Joel Coen	Nominated	
Camerimage	November 20, 2021	Silver Frog (Main Competition)	Bruno Delbonnel, Joel Coen	Won	
Chicago Film Critics Association Awards	December 15, 2021	Best Cinematography	Bruno Delbonnel	Nominated	
Critics' Choice Movie Awards	March 13, 2022	Best Actor	Denzel Washington	Nominated	
Critics' Choice Movie Awards	March 13, 2022	Best Cinematography	Bruno Delbonnel	Nominated	
Dallas–Fort Worth Film Critics Association Awards	December 20, 2021	Best Actor	Denzel Washington	Nominated	
Dublin Film Critics' Circle Awards	December 21, 2021	Best Actress	Frances McDormand	Won	
Georgia Film Critics Association Awards	January 14, 2022	Best Supporting Actress	Kathryn Hunter	Nominated	
Georgia Film Critics Association Awards	January 14, 2022	Best Cinematography	Bruno Delbonnel	Nominated	
Georgia Film Critics Association Awards	January 14, 2022	Best Production Design	Stefan Dechant, Nancy Haigh	Nominated	
Golden Globe Awards	January 9, 2022	Best Actor – Motion Picture Drama	Denzel Washington	Nominated	
Golden Reel Awards	March 13, 2022	Outstanding Achievement in Sound Editing – Dialogue and ADR for Feature Film	Skip Lievsay, Michael Feuser	Nominated	
Hollywood Music in Media Awards	November 17, 2021	Best Original Score in an Independent Film	Carter Burwell	Nominated	
Houston Film Critics Society Awards	January 19, 2022	Best Picture	The Tragedy of Macbeth	Nominated	
Houston Film Critics Society Awards	January 19, 2022	Best Actor	Denzel Washington	Nominated	
Houston Film Critics Society Awards	January 19, 2022	Best Cinematography	Bruno Delbonnel	Nominated	
IndieWire Critics Poll	December 13, 2021	Best Cinematography	Bruno Delbonnel	6th place	
International Cinephile Society Awards	February 6, 2022	Best Cinematography	Bruno Delbonnel	Nominated	
NAACP Image Awards	February 26, 2022	Outstanding Actor in a Motion Picture	Denzel Washington	Nominated	
National Board of Review	December 2, 2021	Top Ten Films	The Tragedy of Macbeth	Won	
National Board of Review	December 2, 2021	Best Adapted Screenplay	Joel Coen	Won	
National Board of Review	December 2, 2021	Outstanding Achievement in Cinematography	Bruno Delbonnel	Won	
New York Film Critics Circle Awards	December 3, 2021	Best Supporting Actress	Kathryn Hunter	Won	
Online Film Critics Society Awards	January 24, 2022	Best Cinematography	Bruno Delbonnel	Nominated	
San Diego Film Critics Society Awards	January 10, 2022	Best Adapted Screenplay	Joel Coen	Nominated	
San Diego Film Critics Society Awards	January 10, 2022	Best Cinematography	Bruno Delbonnel	Nominated	
San Francisco Bay Area Film Critics Circle Awards	January 10, 2022	Best Actor	Denzel Washington	Nominated	
San Francisco Bay Area Film Critics Circle Awards	January 10, 2022	Best Cinematography	Bruno Delbonnel	Won	
San Francisco Bay Area Film Critics Circle Awards	January 10, 2022	Best Production Design	Stefan Dechant	Nominated	
Satellite Awards	April 2, 2022	Best Actor – Motion Picture	Denzel Washington	Nominated	
Satellite Awards	April 2, 2022	Best Adapted Screenplay	Joel Coen	Nominated	
Satellite Awards	April 2, 2022	Best Cinematography	Bruno Delbonnel	Nominated	
Satellite Awards	April 2, 2022	Best Art Direction and Production Design	Stefan Dechant	Won	
Screen Actors Guild Awards	February 27, 2022	Outstanding Performance by a Male Actor in a Leading Role	Denzel Washington	Nominated	
Seattle Film Critics Society Awards	January 17, 2022	Best Cinematography	Bruno Delbonnel	Nominated	
Set Decorators Society of America Awards	February 22, 2022	Best Achievement in Décor/Design of a Science Fiction or Fantasy Feature Film	Stefan Dechant, Nancy Haigh	Nominated	
St. Louis Film Critics Association	December 19, 2021	Best Film	The Tragedy of Macbeth	Nominated	
St. Louis Film Critics Association	December 19, 2021	Best Actor	Denzel Washington	Nominated	
St. Louis Film Critics Association	December 19, 2021	Best Cinematography	Bruno Delbonnel	2nd place	
St. Louis Film Critics Association	December 19, 2021	Best Visual Effects	The Tragedy of Macbeth	2nd place	
St. Louis Film Critics Association	December 19, 2021	Best Score	Carter Burwell	Nominated	
Toronto Film Critics Association Awards	January 16, 2022	Best Actor	Denzel Washington	Won	
USC Scripter Awards	February 26, 2022	Best Film Screenplay	Joel Coen	Nominated	
Vancouver Film Critics Circle Awards	March 7, 2022	Best Actor	Denzel Washington	Nominated	
Visual Effects Society Awards	March 8, 2022	Outstanding Supporting Visual Effects in a Feature Motion Picture	The Tragedy of Macbeth (Note: Nominees: Alex Lemke, Michael Huber, Michael Ralla, Benedikt Laubenthal)	Nominated	
Washington D.C. Area Film Critics Association Awards	December 6, 2021	Best Actor	Denzel Washington	Nominated	
Washington D.C. Area Film Critics Association Awards	December 6, 2021	Best Cinematography	Bruno Delbonnel	Nominated	
Women Film Critics Circle Awards	December 14, 2021	Women's Work: Best Ensemble	Kathryn Hunter	Won	
