= Kong (Monsterverse) =

Monsterverse kaiju

King Kong
- Monsterverse character
- Promotional material for Godzilla vs. Kong depicting Kong
- First appearance: Kong: Skull Island (2017)
- Based on: King Kong by: Edgar Wallace; Merian C. Cooper
- Motion capture: Terry Notary (Kong: Skull Island); Eric Petey (Godzilla vs. Kong); Allan Henry (Godzilla vs. Kong onwards)
- Facial capture: Toby Kebbell (Kong: Skull Island)

In-universe information
- Aliases: Kong; Titanus Kong; Legendary Kong; Monsterverse Kong; King Kong
- Species: Gorilla-like Titan
- Gender: Male
- Family: Deceased parents; Suko (adoptive son)
- Origin: Skull Island
- Home: Skull Island (bef. 1973–2024) (Note: These events are depicted in the Monsterverse timeline, not by the film release date); Hollow Earth (2024–present)

Kong is a giant ape-like monster based on King Kong created by Edgar Wallace and Merian C. Cooper and belongs to Universal Pictures. He is one of the main protagonists in Legendary Pictures' Monsterverse franchise.

Kong is a species of the Great Ape who is one of the few alpha Titans, and is one of the most powerful ape on Earth. He is one of the only survivors of his Great Ape species, the Kong species, that have been almost wiped out completely by the war between the Godzilla species and his kind and later on by the Skullcrawlers.

Kong is also the protector and guardian of both Skull Island and later, the Hollow Earth, defending them from Titans that attempted to conquer or eat them. He is also Suko's adoptive father and friend, Godzilla's former rival, ally and partner and the leader of the Hollow Earth Great Ape tribe after Kong, Godzilla and Shimo destroyed the Skar King, the Hollow Earth Great Ape tribe's tyrannical leader.

== Overview ==
=== Name ===
Throughout the MonsterVerse timeline, this Kong specimen is named Kong onscreen and in the promotional materials of the films he starred in. In 2019, during the events of Godzilla: King of the Monsters, Monarch refers to Kong as Titanus Kong, but the cryptozoological classification for his species in the MonsterVerse is dubbed as "Apus Giganticus".

=== Design ===
In the 2017 film Kong: Skull Island, Kong is scaled to be 104 feet (31.7 m) tall, making it the second largest and largest American incarnation in the series until the 2021 film Godzilla vs. Kong, in which he became the largest incarnation in the series, standing at 337 feet (102.7 m). Director Jordan Vogt-Roberts stated in regard to Kong's immense stature:

The thing that most interested me was, how big do you need to make [Kong], so that when someone lands on this island and doesn't believe in the idea of myth, the idea of wonder – when we live in a world of social and civil unrest, and everything is crumbling around us, and technology and facts are taking over – how big does this creature need to be, so that when you stand on the ground and you look up at it, the only thing that can go through your mind is: "That's a god!"

If anything, our Kong is meant to be a throwback to the '33 version. [Kong] was a movie monster, so we worked really hard to take some of the elements of the '33 version, some of those exaggerated features, some of those cartoonish and iconic qualities, and then make them their own…We created something that to some degree served as a throwback to the inspiration for what started all of this, but then also [had] it be a fully unique and different creature that – I would like to think – is fully contained and identifiable as the 2017 version of King Kong. I think there are very modern elements to him, yet hopefully, he feels very timeless at the same time.

— Jordan Vogt-Roberts

He also stated that the original 1933 look was the inspiration for the design:

We sort of went back to the 1933 version in the sense that he's a bipedal creature that walks in an upright position, as opposed to the anthropomorphic, anatomically correct silverback gorilla that walks on all fours. Our Kong was intended to say, like, this isn't just a big gorilla or a big monkey. This is something that is its own species. It has its own set of rules, so we can do what we want and we really wanted to pay homage to what came before ... and yet do something completely different, and if anything, our Kong is meant to be a throwback to the '33 version. I don't think there's much similarity at all between our version and Peter [Jackson]'s Kong. That version is very much a scaled-up silverback gorilla, and ours is something that is slightly more exaggerated. A big mandate for us was, "How do we make this feel like a classic movie monster"?

Co-producer Mary Parent also stated that Kong is still young and not fully grown as she explains that "Kong is an adolescent when we meet him in the film; he's still growing into his role as alpha".

== Appearances ==
=== Movies ===
- Kong: Skull Island (2017)
- Godzilla: King of the Monsters (2019, cave painting depiction and monitor)
- Godzilla vs. Kong (2021)
- Godzilla x Kong: The New Empire (2024)
- Godzilla x Kong: Supernova (2027)

=== TV shows ===
- Skull Island (2023)
- Monarch: Legacy of Monsters (2023-2026)

=== Comics ===
- Skull Island: Birth of Kong (2017)
- Kingdom Kong (2021)
- Justice League vs. Godzilla vs. Kong (2023-2024)
- Godzilla x Kong: The Hunted (2024)
- Which is Stronger!? Godzilla x Kong (2024)

=== Novels ===
- Kong: Skull Island - The Official Movie Novelization (2017)
- Godzilla: King of the Monsters - The Official Movie Novelization (2019)
- Godzilla vs. Kong - The Official Movie Novelization (2021)
- Godzilla x Kong: The New Empire - The Official Movie Novelization (2024)
- Godzilla x Kong: Supernova - The Official Movie Novelization (2027)

=== Video games ===
- MOBA Legends (2017)
- PUBG: Mobile (2021)
- Magic Domain (2021)
- World of Warships (2021)
- LifeAfter (2021)
- Funko Pop! Blitz (2021)
- Go Big! (2021)
- Godzilla Battle Line (2021)
- Call of Duty: Vanguard (2022)
- Call of Duty: Warzone (2022)
- Evony: The King's Return (2022)
- Godzilla x Kong: Titan Chasers (2024)
- Lords Mobile (2024)
- Kong: Survivor Instinct (2024)
- Fortnite Battle Royale (2025)

== Merchandise ==
On December 12, 2024, McFarlane Toys announced their new Batman 2-Pack with Titanus Kong, naming the set they released as Batman vs Kong.
