= Godzilla x Kong: Supernova =

Upcoming American monster film

- Official logo
- Directed by: Grant Sputore
- Written by: David Callaham
- Based on: Godzilla and SpaceGodzilla by Toho Co. Ltd.
- Produced by: Mary Parent; Thomas Tull; Alex Garcia; Jon Jashni
- Starring: Kaitlyn Dever; Dan Stevens; Jack O'Connell; Alycia Debnam-Carey; Matthew Modine; Delroy Lindo; Sam Neill
- Cinematography: Dan Mindel
- Edited by: Josh Schaeffer
- Music by: Henry Jackman
- Production company: Legendary Pictures
- Distributed by: Warner Bros. Pictures (Worldwide); Toho Co., Ltd. (Japan)
- Release date: March 26, 2027
- Country: United States
- Language: English

Godzilla x Kong: Supernova is an upcoming American monster film directed by Grant Sputore. Produced by Legendary Pictures and distributed by Warner Bros. Pictures, it is a sequel to Godzilla x Kong: The New Empire and will serve as the sixth film in Legendary's Monsterverse franchise, as well as the 40th film in the Godzilla franchise (Note: It will be the sixth Godzilla film to be completely produced by a Hollywood studio. The American releases of Godzilla (Godzilla, King of the Monsters!), King Kong vs. Godzilla, and The Return of Godzilla (Godzilla 1985) featured additional footage produced by independent Hollywood studios. The footage featured Western actors and merged it with the original Japanese footage in order to appeal to American audiences. Invasion of Astro-Monster was the first Godzilla film to be co-produced by a Japanese studio (Toho) and an American studio (UPA). The 1998 film Godzilla produced by TriStar Pictures was the first Godzilla film to be completely produced by an American studio.) and the 14th film in the King Kong franchise. The film stars Kaitlyn Dever, Dan Stevens reprising his role from the previous film, Jack O'Connell, Alycia Debnam-Carey, Matthew Modine, Delroy Lindo, and Sam Neill in one of his final film roles.

Following the success of Godzilla x Kong: The New Empire in March 2024, a sequel was announced the following May. Sputore was hired to direct the following month, after Adam Wingard, who previously directed Godzilla vs. Kong and Godzilla x Kong: The New Empire, was unable to return to direct a third film featuring Godzilla and Kong due to scheduling conflicts. Principal photography commenced in April 2025 at Village Roadshow Studios in Gold Coast, Queensland, Australia.

The film is slated to be released on March 26, 2027.

== Premise ==
Godzilla and Kong must team up once again, this time against a cosmic threat in the form of SpaceGodzilla.

== Cast ==
- Kaitlyn Dever as Jesse Portman
- Dan Stevens as Trapper
- Jack O'Connell as John Portman
- Alycia Debnam-Carey
- Delroy Lindo as Conway, Monarch's director
- Matthew Modine as General Fulton
- Sam Neill
- Josh Thomson as Ledon
- Bronte Pearce as EDN Tech Gardner
- Sami Afuni as Lieutenant Payne

== Production ==
=== Development ===
Prior to the sequel's formal announcement, filmmaker Adam Wingard (director of Godzilla vs. Kong and Godzilla x Kong: The New Empire) expressed interest in returning for a third film featuring Godzilla and Kong, stating, "if you've done two movies, like, maybe you should just go ahead and do a third because, as you said, there's a trilogy in there," but noted that "it just depends on how [Godzilla x Kong: The New Empire] does and how things kind of shape out." Wingard iterated that ideas had been discussed as to where to take the franchise onward and that he would take a "different approach" on the next film if he was invited back to direct. He also suggested that the next film could potentially follow Godzilla primarily and explore his perspective in the same way The New Empire followed Kong.

Godzilla x Kong: The New Empire was released on March 29, 2024, and became the highest-grossing film in the Monsterverse franchise, grossing $571.9 million against a budget of between $135–150 million. Commenting on the film's box office success, producer and Legendary Pictures's chairman of worldwide production Mary Parent said, "This is certainly an exciting result. We are in a good position to continue the journey, but let's see how Godzilla x Kong unfolds."

On May 10, 2024, Legendary announced that David Callaham, who wrote the early drafts for Godzilla (2014), would write a follow-up to Godzilla x Kong: The New Empire. The following week, Legendary announced that Wingard would not return to direct the film due to scheduling conflicts and commitments with the film Onslaught; however, they expressed interest in having Wingard return to direct another installment in the MonsterVerse one day. In June 2024, Legendary announced Grant Sputore as the film's new director, with the film now scheduled to be released on March 26, 2027.

=== Pre-production ===
Dan Stevens expressed interest in reprising his role as Trapper from Godzilla x Kong: The New Empire in an Inverse interview, saying that "there's many more adventures that you could get out of him", and praised Sputore as a "great choice" for the new director. On January 24, 2025, Kaitlyn Dever was the first actress to be cast in the film. A month later, Jack O'Connell and Delroy Lindo were cast, while Stevens was confirmed to be reprising his role from the previous film. That March, The Hollywood Reporter stated that Matthew Modine had been added to the cast and that filming of the sequel is expected to commence in April 2025. In April, Alycia Debnam-Carey and Sam Neill joined the cast.

=== Filming and post-production ===
On March 5, 2025, The Hollywood Reporter stated that principal photography on the sequel was expected to begin in April 2025 in Australia. On April 4, Dever told Seven News' Sally Bowrey that filming of the sequel had started, with London-set scenes being filmed in Brisbane, Queensland. According to IF Magazine that April 23, Screen Queensland disclosed that filming was ongoing at Village Roadshow Studios. Stefan Dechant was working as the production designer, with Dan Mindel as the cinematographer, Kelly Port as the visual effects supervisor, Michael Lloyd Green as the co-screenwriter, Henry Jackman as the composer, and Josh Schaeffer as the editor; both Jackman and Schaeffer have served as composer and editor respectively on previous Monsterverse films. On May 9, 2025, a teaser video was released online, revealing the film's title as Godzilla x Kong: Supernova, which sparked speculation among fans that either SpaceGodzilla or Gigan would appear.

In an interview with KTVU in Oakland, Lindo stated that the film will feature a "human element" and that criticism towards the franchise's human characters would be taken into account, as he said that the characters will be "as humanly relatable as possible" and "the human element also has to be compelling for audiences". Via an Instagram story, costume designer Ann Foley revealed that principal photography had concluded in Australia and that more filming would take place in Utah. On August 1, 2025, The Times-Independent reported that filming, which had taken place under the working title Zeus, had just finished in Moab, Utah, its only shooting location in the United States; scenes set in Sedona, Arizona, were filmed in Moab.

On August 23, a second unit team led by Darrin Prescott filmed in Mexico City, Mexico, in the areas of Paseo de la Reforma, Santa Fe, and Palacio de Bellas Artes, with the participation of 150 extras. After filming in Mexico, shooting was expected to continue in London and Mumbai in the following months. On October 5, 2025, filming started in central London, England, with combat vehicles and extras dressed in British Armed Forces uniforms. On October 20, crew members Dan Mindel and Simon England were spotted at Chatuchak Weekend Market in Bangkok, Thailand, filming scenes.

In November 2025, the Writers Guild of America West initially published the feature credits; Callaham received a "Story By" credit and Green received a "Screenplay By" credit along with Callaham. The "Source Material" credits also revealed that SpaceGodzilla would be featured in the film. However, the Writers Guild later updated the credits in February 2026 by giving Callaham a sole "Written By" credit.

Near the end of April, a brief synopsis was revealed in a listing at the China Licensing Expo, which read: "As the sixth instalment in the 'MonsterVerse' film series, this movie will delve deeper into the delicate relationship of coexistence and trust between humans and prehistoric behemoths. Meanwhile, the earth-shaking monster storm triggered by the epic clash between Godzilla and Kong, the two guardians of Earth's ecological balance, will once again sweep across the big screen!"

== Release ==
Godzilla x Kong: Supernova is scheduled to be released in the United States by Warner Bros. Pictures on March 26, 2027, in IMAX.

== Sources ==
- Kalat, David (2010). A Critical History and Filmography of Toho's Godzilla Series (Second ed.). McFarland. ISBN 9780786447497.
- Ryfle, Steve (1998). Japan's Favorite Mon-Star: The Unauthorized Biography of the Big G. ECW Press. ISBN 1550223488.
