= Kong: Survivor Instinct =

- Developer: 7levels SA
- Publishers: 7levels, 4Divinity
- Platforms: Windows, PlayStation 5, Nintendo Switch, Xbox Series X
- Release: October 24, 2024
- Genre: Metroidvania
- Mode: Single-player

Kong: Survivor Instinct is a 2024 Metroidvania game. It is set within the continuity of the MonsterVerse franchise, and it was developed by 7levels SA and published by 7levels and 4Divinity. It was released on October 24, 2024.

== Plot ==
A father named David Martin searches for his missing daughter in a crumbling city ravaged by Kong and other kaiju.

== Gameplay ==
Kong: Survivor Instinct is a 2.5D side-scrolling Metroidvania game in which players take control of a human character named David Martin, as he attempts to navigate a city destroyed by Kaiju. Gameplay consists of a mixture of platforming and puzzle solving, with a grappling hook allowing the player to reach higher areas. The player can also use guns to shoot monsters and padlocks to unlock new areas, Combat also involves blocking and parrying blows from enemies, and shooting an enemy in the leg also weakens them and allows David to perform a finishing move.

== Development ==
The game was first announced on August 19, 2024.

== Reception ==
Kong: Survivor Instinct received mixed reviews from critics, apart from the Windows version, which holds a score of 75% on Metacritic, indicating "generally favorable" reviews. Tristan Ogilvie of IGN awarded it a score of 5 out of 10, saying "Unlike its towering cast of kaiju cameos, Kong: Survivor Instinct is an unremarkable Metroidvania-style adventure that simply doesn’t measure up." Henry Stockdale of Push Square also awarded it a score of 5 out of 10, saying "For a human-focused story, it's unfortunate that more time wasn't put into this, and while exploration is passable, the gameplay soon falls into repetition. Unless you're a die-hard fan of Legendary's Monsterverse, it's difficult to recommend this over other Metroidvanias." Blair Bishop of TechRaptor also awarded it a score of 5 out of 10, calling it “rugged platformer, but a dire Metroidvania, struggling to truly feel like a part of its namesakes legacy.” Ben Lyons of Gamereactor was critical of the combat and the repetitive nature of the gameplay, awarding it a score of 5 out of 10, and saying "Beyond offering a bit of extra lore for the dedicated Monsterverse fan, there's not much else worthy of attention."
