= Godzilla (Monsterverse) =

Fictional monster, or kaiju

- Monsterverse character
- Godzilla's 2014 design revealed via Empire
- First appearance: Godzilla (2014)
- Based on: Godzilla by Toho Co., Ltd.
- Adapted by: Gareth Edwards; David Callaham; Max Borenstein
- Designed by: Matt Allsopp
- Motion capture: T.J. Storm

In-universe information
- Aliases: Gojira; Hollywood Godzilla; Titanus Gojira
- Gender: Male

Godzilla (/ɡɒdˈzɪlə/ ɡod-ZIL-ə) (Note: Japanese: ゴジラ, Hepburn: Gojira; IPA: [ɡoꜜʑiɾa]) is a giant monster, or kaiju, based on Toho Co., Ltd.'s character of the same name, and one of the main protagonists in Legendary Pictures' Monsterverse franchise. The character first appeared in the 2014 film Godzilla, directed by Gareth Edwards.

This incarnation of Godzilla is depicted as the sole survivor of a prehistoric super-species, acting as a bringer of balance. The character was designed by Matt Allsopp, modeled after the Toho iteration.

He is the third incarnation of Godzilla to be reimagined by an American studio, after Hanna-Barbera's 1978 animated series Godzilla and TriStar Pictures' 1998 film Godzilla, and overall the tenth onscreen incarnation of the iconic character.

== Overview ==
=== Name ===
Godzilla is referred to by Ishirō Serizawa, played by Ken Watanabe, as "Gojira" (ゴジラ) though later on he would be referred to by other characters as "Godzilla". Watanabe argued with the producer to have his character refer to Godzilla by his Japanese name, stating, "the important thing is where the icon comes from. The first movie it was very important for me to call him Gojira, and I explained that his name was the really correct version I needed to say." In the 2014 video game Godzilla, he is labeled as "Hollywood Godzilla" to distinguish him from other iterations present in the game.

In Godzilla: King of the Monsters, Godzilla is given the scientific name "Titanus Gojira", after the designation for the monsters was changed from "MUTO" (Massive Unidentified Terrestrial Organisms) to "Titans."

In the graphic novel Godzilla: Aftershock, a different member of Godzilla's species is named "Dagon."

=== Design ===
Throughout Legendary Pictures' productions, Godzilla has retained a mostly consistent design. Each new director has made slight alterations to the design to suit their ideas, which includes altering the dorsal plates and, at times, giving Godzilla an empowered form; Godzilla has had a Burning, Energized, and Evolved form.

For Godzilla (2014), producer Thomas Tull was adamant about keeping Godzilla's design consistent with the Toho version, stating, "We had to make triply sure we got it right. Godzilla had to look like Godzilla. Period." In February 2014, Legendary debuted the final design of their Godzilla on the cover of Empire. Director Gareth Edwards and the design group reviewed all previous incarnations of Godzilla's design for inspiration. Gareth Edwards stated, "The way I tried to view it was to imagine Godzilla was a real creature and someone from Toho saw him in the 1950s and ran back to the studio to make a movie about the creature and was trying their best to remember it and draw it. And in our film you get to see him for real." He went on to say that his Godzilla remains true to the original in all aspects. Gareth Edwards also stressed that, "It was important to me that this felt like a Toho Godzilla" and concluded by wishing, "I'd love ours (Godzilla) to be considered as part of the Toho group."

Gareth Edwards feared that a rounded appearance would make Godzilla look "cutesy" like a Muppet, and had the design team sharpen and straighten Godzilla's face and body to avert rounded proportions. Various sources inspired Godzilla's design: the eyes were modeled after the Skeksis from The Dark Crystal, komodo dragons and birds of prey influenced the hands and regal bearings, and gills were added to explain Godzilla's underwater capabilities. Filmmaker and Motion capture expert Andy Serkis provided consultation on the film's motion capture sequences in order to "control the souls" of the creatures. Serkis stated that the film's performance capture had already been filmed before he was approached.

For Godzilla: King of the Monsters (2019), director and co-writer Michael Dougherty made tweaks to Edwards' design by shaping the dorsal plates closer to the original 1954 plates and increasing their size. Dougherty also made the feet and claws "a bit bigger" to reflect Godzilla's predatory nature when attacking prey. During the film's climax, Godzilla briefly transforms into Burning Godzilla. The Burning form was introduced in Toho's Godzilla vs. Destoroyah (1995) and was treated as an impending doomsday trigger, however, King of the Monsters reinterprets it as a temporary power-up due to Godzilla's increased radiation levels after being directly blasted with a nuclear warhead.

For Godzilla vs. Kong (2021), director Adam Wingard chose not to alter the 2019 design in order to retain consistency; Wingard wanted audiences to experience the iterations of Godzilla and Kong they were already familiar with. Despite this, Wingard was tempted to make alterations to Godzilla, stating, "I probably would have liked to, for instance, made Godzilla's head a little bit bigger, his head's a little small."

For Monarch: Legacy of Monsters (2023), VFX supervisor Sean Konrad tried to tie his design and animation to the look established in the feature films. The show presents two designs for Godzilla, one from the 1950s timeline with spikier dorsal fins similar to the 2014 design and one from the 2015 timeline with curvier dorsal fins after the damage he sustained from the 2014 battle.

For Godzilla x Kong: The New Empire (2024), Godzilla's design remains the same until he transforms into his "Evolved" state after defeating Tiamat. In this new form he exhibits a number of physical differences, including a slimmer physical build, pink dorsal plates, the growth of spikes across his face as well as spike protrusions grown from his forearms and a set of thagomizers from his tail's tip. Lead character designer Jared Krichevsky stated that the "Evolved" transformation's color was inspired by Goku's Kai-o-ken technique in Dragon Ball Z.

=== Characterization ===
For the 2014 version, Gareth Edwards designed Godzilla to have a personality that would evoke the "last samurai" archetype, calling him "a lone, ancient warrior who prefers to be left alone until world events force him to resurface."

In Godzilla (2014), Godzilla is 355 ft (108.2 m) tall. In Godzilla: King of the Monsters (2019) and then on, his height is increased to 393 ft (119.8 m) tall. While the Toho iterations of Godzilla are gender-neutral, Legendary's Godzilla is specified as a male. When asked about the gender, Dougherty answered, "it's a he, he's called King of the Monsters."

=== Reception ===
IndieWire called Godzilla's design "more classic than groundbreaking", with praise for the size, scale, fins, sound design, and visual effects, stating, "The visuals are really impressive and perhaps more importantly, feel realistic to the world of the movie around it." Screenwriter Kazuki Nakajima criticized the 2014 film for turning Godzilla into a "good guy", stating it is "the sort of Godzilla aimed at kids in the late Showa Era." Illustrator Yuji Kaida praised the 2014 film for treating Godzilla like "a force beyond human understanding that maintained the Earth's natural balance," as well as praising the physique of the design and how Gareth Edwards conveyed the mass. A few Japanese fans felt the 2014 design was "too fat".

=== Public displays ===
In 2014, a 6.6-metre (22-foot; 6,600-millimetre; 660-centimetre; 260-inch) tall statue of Godzilla's upper body was installed at Tokyo Midtown in Tokyo, Japan to commemorate the release of the 2014 film. The statue performed light shows on a nightly basis using “mist, audio, and fire rays.” Another statue of the 2014 Godzilla was installed at a Japanese theature to promote the 2014 film. In 2019, a statue of Burning Godzilla was installed at Tokyo, Japan to commemorate the release of Godzilla: King of the Monsters. A statue of Godzilla's normal state was installed at a Godzilla Exhibition on the 7th floor of the Seibu Shibuya store Movita Building.

== Appearances ==
=== Films ===
- Godzilla (2014)
- Godzilla: King of the Monsters (2019)
- Godzilla vs. Kong (2021)
- Godzilla x Kong: The New Empire (2024)
- Godzilla x Kong: Supernova (2027)

=== Television ===
- Monarch: Legacy of Monsters (2023)

=== Comics ===
- Godzilla: Awakening (2014)
- Godzilla: Aftershock (2019)
- Godzilla Dominion (2021)
- Justice League vs. Godzilla vs. Kong (2023)
- Godzilla x Kong: The Hunted (2024)
- Which is Stronger!? Godzilla x Kong (2024)

=== Novels ===
- Godzilla: The Official Movie Novelization (2014)
- Godzilla: King of the Monsters - The Official Movie Novelization (2019)
- Godzilla vs. Kong - The Official Movie Novelization (2021)
- Godzilla x Kong: The New Empire - The Official Movie Novelization (2024)

=== Games ===
- Godzilla: Strike Zone (Android, iOS - 2014)
- Godzilla: Crisis Defense (Browser - 2014)
- Godzilla: Smash3 (Android and iOS - 2014)
- Godzilla (PlayStation 3 and PlayStation 4 - 2014) — as Hollywood Godzilla
- Godzilla: Kaiju Collection (Android and iOS - 2015)
- PUBG Mobile (Android and iOS - 2021)
- World of Warships (PC, PlayStation 4, Xbox One - 2021)
- Go Big! (2021)
- Godzilla Battle Line (Android and iOS - 2021)
- Call of Duty: Warzone (PC, PlayStation 4, PlayStation 5, Xbox One, Xbox Series X/S - 2022)
- Godzilla x Kong: Titan Chasers (Android, iOS, PC - 2024)
- Fortnite (various platforms - 2024/25) — as Godzilla Evolved

== See also ==
- Godzilla (TriStar)
- Godzilla (1978 TV series)

== Bibliography ==
- Cotta Vaz, Mark (2014). Godzilla: The Art of Destruction. Insight Editions. ISBN 9781608873449.
- Nelson, Arvid (2019). Godzilla: Aftershock. Legendary Comics. ISBN 9781681160535.
