= Kong: Skull Island (soundtrack) =

Kong: Skull Island (Original Motion Picture Soundtrack)

Soundtrack album by Henry Jackman
- Released: March 3, 2017
- Recorded: 2016–2017
- Genre: Film score
- Length: 56:56
- Label: WaterTower Music

Henry Jackman chronology
Jack Reacher: Never Go Back (2016)	Kong: Skull Island (Original Motion Picture Soundtrack) (2017)	Kingsman: The Golden Circle (2017)

Professional ratings
Review scores
Source	Rating
Soundtrack Universe	2/5 stars
Movie Wave Net	2/5 stars
Filmtracks	3/5 stars
Sci-Fi Bulletin	9/10 stars

Kong: Skull Island (Original Motion Picture Soundtrack) is the soundtrack album to the 2017 American monster film Kong: Skull Island, composed by Henry Jackman.

It featured 24 tracks which was digitally released on March 3, 2017, through WaterTower Music. It was bundled into a double LP format published by Waxwork Records and was released on January 19, 2018. In 2022, Reservoir Media acquired the rights to the catalog of Jackman's film scores, with Kong: Skull Island also being included in this catalog.

== Development ==
Since the film takes place in the 1970s, Jackman blended '70s psychedelic guitars into the score, which was considered to be a combination of mixing electronic sounds with symphony orchestra. Jackman stated that "The great thing about a monster movie is that it opens the door to use the symphony orchestra in its most sumptuous way. [Director] Jordan [Vogt-Roberts] was happy to celebrate the gravity and history that comes with a full orchestra, but we also explored less traditional elements. That's a field day for a composer." The score was recorded at AIR Lyndhurst Studios with the London Voices and conducted by Gavin Greenaway, with additional music by Alex Belcher, Halli Cauthery, and Stephen Hilton.

Regarding the music used in the film, Vogt-Roberts stated, "I wanted to use songs from the Vietnam era and a myriad of hits from the '70s... [T]his provides a striking dichotomy, sets the tone and gives us great moments of fun. The music, which serves to both heighten the film's emotion and underscore the action, was one of the final creative elements to fall into place during post-production. It was the culmination of a massive undertaking that had taken the production to three continents."

For the sequel Godzilla vs. Kong (2021), the original cues composed for Kong: Skull Island were disregarded and Tom Holkenborg composed fresh themes for Kong's character in the film.

== Track listing ==
All music is composed by Henry Jackman.

Kong: Skull Island (Original Motion Picture Soundtrack)
No.	Title	Length
1.	"South Pacific"	0:35
2.	"The Beach"	1:27
3.	"Project Monarch"	2:02
4.	"Packard's Blues"	1:14
5.	"Assembling the Team"	1:48
6.	"Into the Storm"	2:44
7.	"The Island"	1:16
8.	"Kong the Destroyer"	3:43
9.	"Monsters Exist"	2:27
10.	"Spider Attack"	1:39
11.	"Dominant Species"	2:00
12.	"The Temple"	5:47
13.	"Grey Fox"	2:33
14.	"Kong the Protector"	1:49
15.	"Marlow's Farewell"	2:37
16.	"Lost"	1:27
17.	"The Boneyard"	1:52
18.	"Ambushed"	2:21
19.	"The Heart of Kong"	2:11
20.	"Man vs. Beast"	2:31
21.	"Creature from the Deep"	2:44
22.	"The Battle of Skull Island"	5:46
23.	"King Kong"	2:42
24.	"Monster Mash (Bonus track)"	1:27
Total length:		56:56

Music appearing in the film and not included in the soundtrack

#	Title	Performer(s)
1	"Time Has Come Today"	The Chambers Brothers
2	"Mat Troi Den"	Minh Xuân
3	"White Rabbit"	Jefferson Airplane
4	"Long Cool Woman in a Black Dress"	The Hollies
5	"Down on the Street"	The Stooges
6	"Paranoid"	Black Sabbath
7	"Brother"	Jorge Ben
8	"Bad Moon Rising"	Creedence Clearwater Revival
9	"Ziggy Stardust"	David Bowie
10	"Run Through the Jungle"	Creedence Clearwater Revival
11	"We'll Meet Again"	Vera Lynn
