= Skull Island (TV series) =

American animated television series

- Promotional release poster
- Genre: Action; Adventure; Science fiction
- Based on: Skull Island by Merian C. Cooper and Edgar Wallace
- Developed by: Brian Duffield
- Showrunner: Brian Duffield
- Written by: Brian Duffield
- Voices of: Nicolas Cantu; Mae Whitman; Darren Barnet; Benjamin Bratt; Betty Gilpin
- Composers: Joseph Trapanese; Jason Lazarus
- Country of origin: United States
- Original language: English
- No. of seasons: 1
- No. of episodes: 8

Production
- Executive producers: Brad Graeber; Jen Chambers; Thomas Tull; Jacob Robinson; Brian Duffield
- Running time: 20–26 minutes
- Production companies: Netflix Animation Studios; Powerhouse Animation; Legendary Television; JP

Original release
- Network: Netflix
- Release: June 22, 2023

Skull Island is an American animated adventure television series developed by Brian Duffield for Netflix. It is the fifth installment and the first television series of the Monsterverse franchise and a sequel to Kong: Skull Island (2017). The series was produced by Powerhouse Animation and Legendary Television with animation services provided by Studio Mir. Nicolas Cantu, Mae Whitman, Darren Barnet, Benjamin Bratt, and Betty Gilpin star in main roles as a group of shipwrecked explorers who find themselves on Skull Island in the 1990s, where they encounter giant-sized prehistoric creatures, including the island's self-appointed guardian Kong.

The series premiered on June 22, 2023. It received generally positive reviews from critics. The comic book miniseries Return to Skull Island acts as a continuation of Skull Island and was released in July 2025.

== Premise ==
In 1993 a group of explorers venture out to sea to rescue a young girl stranded in the middle of the ocean. In doing so, they find themselves shipwrecked on the perilous Skull Island. Together, they fight to survive the dangers of the mysterious isle, which is home to large creatures and terrifying monsters, including Kong.

== Voice cast and characters ==
- Nicolas Cantu as Charlie
- Mae Whitman as Annie
- Darren Barnet as Mike
- Benjamin Bratt as Cap
- Betty Gilpin as Irene
- Phil LaMarr as Sam
- Fryda Wolff as Island Girl
- Tania Gunadi as Islander

== Episodes ==
No.	Title	Directed by	Written by	Original release date
1	"Maritime Pilot"	Danny Araya	Brian Duffield	June 22, 2023
Two best friends, Charlie and Mike, are accompanying their fathers, Cap and Hiro, on an expedition in the South Pacific in search of cryptids. Charlie discovers a mysterious girl adrift in the ocean; she identifies herself as Annie, and explains that she escaped from another ship. She becomes alarmed when they see a flare in the distance, but the ship that launched it mysteriously sinks. Two mercenaries sneak aboard the group's vessel to capture Annie, but the boat is attacked by a giant tentacled creature, "the Kraken". The creature destroys the boat, killing both mercenaries and most of the crew, including Hiro. In the aftermath, Charlie and Mike wash up on the shore of Skull Island.
2	"The Last Blank Space on the Map"	Julie Olson; Amanda Sitareh B.	Brian Duffield	June 22, 2023
In a flashback, Mike and Hiro acquire a chart with the location of Skull Island from a former member of an expedition that visited the island in 1973, (Note: As depicted in Kong: Skull Island (2017)) who warns them not to go there. In the present, Mike and Charlie are attacked by giant crabs on the island's beach, but Annie arrives to help them, and the crabs are scared away by a distant creature roaring. Cap also awakens on the island and encounters a scientist named Irene, who leads a group of mercenaries and is looking for Annie. Mike is horrified when he realizes that the trio are stranded on Skull Island, although Annie claims to be from a different island, before they're confronted by two mercenaries and attacked by a large doglike creature.
3	"What's Up, Croc?"	Danny Araya	Brian Duffield	June 22, 2023
Charlie, Mike, and one of the mercenaries flee from the doglike creature, which the mercenary claims to be Annie's pet. The mercenary is killed by a crocodilian monster, which pursues the boys until it is caught and eaten by Kong. The boys then reunite with Annie and her pet, who she named Dog, and Annie tells Charlie that Cap is alive. Meanwhile, Irene informs Cap that she and the mercenaries found Annie on another, nearby island, and were attempting to take her back to the United States. One of the mercenaries is carried off by a giant hawk, but the rest of the group reach a safe area. Irene calls in a helicopter from the mercenaries' ship, but the Kraken destroys it. Charlie, Annie, Mike and Dog continue to explore the island, while Mike conceals an injury from the others.
4	"Breakfast Fit for a Kong"	Amanda Sitareh B.	Brian Duffield	June 22, 2023
Annie explains that she and Dog bonded on their island after their fathers killed each other. Charlie is separated from Annie and Mike when he falls down a tunnel made by giant ants. Meanwhile, Cap, Irene and the mercenaries continue their search for Annie. Irene is almost eaten by a giant carnivorous flower, but the others save her. Cap explains that his obsession with cryptids began when he saw a giant monster in the ocean, and theorizes that Skull Island is home to a variety of creatures that have migrated up from the "Hollow Earth". After locating Charlie, Mike and Annie enter the tunnel to try to rescue him; they're attacked by a giant ant, but Dog enters the tunnel too and saves them. Sensing that the mercenaries are closing in, Annie and Dog prepare to confront them, but they accidentally stray into the territory of the giant hawk.
5	"Doggone It"	Danny Araya	Brian Duffield	June 22, 2023
Annie and Dog face off against Irene and the mercenaries, but Irene shoots Annie with a tranquilizer dart and Dog is carried off by the giant hawk. Mike reveals himself as a distraction so that Charlie can escape, and it is revealed that Irene and Mike already know each other. Charlie encounters a masked stranger, before the giant hawk carries him off as well. However, it deposits him and Dog unharmed on an ancient stone temple. Mike informs Cap that Irene had secretly funded their expedition in the hopes of finding the island, before deducing that Irene is Annie's mother. Charlie manages to befriend Dog, and they escape from the temple after an encounter with Kong. The Kraken throws a dead whale into the middle of the island as a challenge to Kong, while Cap discovers Mike's hidden wound after Mike collapses.
6	"Terms of Endearment"	Amanda Sitareh B.	Brian Duffield	June 22, 2023
In a flashback, Annie remembers how she bonded with Dog after their fathers' deaths ten years earlier. In the present, Annie wakes up and is greeted by Irene. She theorizes that Mike was injured when the Kraken attacked him, and Cap warns that Mike will die if they can't get him off the island soon. Charlie and Dog make their way back across the island and are able to find the group's camp again. Irene tells Annie that she is her mother, but Annie is resentful of her because of the previous clashes between Dog and Irene's mercenaries. Charlie and Dog are attacked by a pack of camouflaged creatures, but they're able to fight off the creatures with help from Annie and the mercenaries. Charlie is reunited with Cap, while Irene apologizes to Annie and Dog. The Kraken attacks the camp and kills one of the mercenaries. Realizing that they have to kill the Kraken before they can escape from the island, Charlie suggests using Kong to kill it.
7	"You're Not a King, You're Just a Stupid Animal"	Danny Araya	Brian Duffield	June 22, 2023
Years earlier, Kong formed a bond with a Spanish-speaking girl who lived on the island with a community of other shipwreck survivors, and saved her from a Skullcrawler. The giant hawk also has a bond with Kong, and sometimes brings food to his temple for him. The trio discovered a dead Sker Buffalo, which had been killed by a pack of giant chameleon-like creatures. Working together, Kong, the hawk and the girl were able to kill all of the chameleons, although Kong was injured in the process. He cleaned his wounds in the ocean, but the smell of his blood in the water awakened the Kraken, which had been hibernating on the ocean floor near the island. The next evening, the Kraken attacked the human settlement, wiping them all out and leaving the girl badly wounded. The Kraken challenged Kong when he arrived, but Kong withdrew and carried the girl to his temple, where she died. Kong buried the girl and placed her necklace on an altar in his temple. In the present day, Charlie explains his plan to lure Kong to the ocean using the necklace, having noted his attachment to it.
8	"You'll Never Catch a Monkey That Way"	Amanda Sitareh B.	Brian Duffield	June 22, 2023
Charlie convinces Annie and the others to follow his plan, pointing out that Mike will die if they cannot get rid of the Kraken and escape the island. Charlie reconciles with Cap over their differing hopes for his future, before he leaves with Annie and Dog. They enter the temple and are confronted by Kong; Annie steals the necklace, and they flee the temple with Kong in pursuit. Dog is unable to outrun Kong while carrying both Charlie and Annie, so Charlie jumps off his back and is captured by several masked island natives. Cap and Mike go looking for Charlie, while Annie lures Kong to the beach, where the Kraken attacks him. A battle ensues between the two monsters, and the Kraken gains the upper hand, until Kong manages to wound it by stabbing it with the broken hull of Cap's sunken boat. Kong ultimately kills the Kraken by ripping it in half. However, when he throws its body into the ocean, Annie is knocked out by the resulting tidal wave. She awakens two weeks later, in a hospital on the mainland, and is greeted by Irene.

== Production ==
Promotional key art (left to right): Charlie and Mike, Kong (center), Annie and other explorers from Skull Island

In January 2021, the series was announced as part of a partnership between Netflix and Legendary Entertainment. Brian Duffield was confirmed to write, executive produce and act as showrunner alongside executive producer Jacob Robinson. Powerhouse Animation Studios and Legendary Television were confirmed to handle the production of the series, with Studio Mir providing animation services.

In interviews regarding the initial development of the series, Robinson explained that the genesis of the series was to create "Goonies on Skull Island". Robinson pitched the idea to Duffield, and they conceived the series to focus primarily on the human characters. Regarding the decision to tell the story in an animated format, Robinson stated that due to "the intimacy of animation itself" and the reduced budget compared to a live-action series, it would allow them to feature "incredible visuals and epic battles". He would go on to praise Duffield's scripts, noting that "I don't think I've ever given fewer notes on a project than on this". Series director Willis Bulliner elaborated on the process behind creating the series, stating how they wanted to "create as many new characters as we could" and "borrow as much references as we can from what's available" despite Legendary lacking the rights to use fictional monsters owned by Toho.

In June 2022, the first teaser image was released by Netflix. In May 2023, the voice cast was announced with Nicolas Cantu, Mae Whitman, Darren Barnet, Benjamin Bratt, and Betty Gilpin among the main cast. Alongside the announcement, the first teaser trailer was also released, confirming the release date.

In October 2023, Duffield stated that the scripts for the second season had been completed and that they were waiting to learn if the series would be green-lit for another season by Netflix. In March 2025, it was announced that the storyline of Skull Island would continue in the Return to Skull Island comic book miniseries that released in July 2025. In October 2025, a sequel comic book miniseries, Escape from Skull Island, was announced and released in January 2026.

== Release ==
All eight episodes of Skull Island were released on Netflix on June 22, 2023.

== Reception ==
The review aggregator website Rotten Tomatoes reports an approval rating of 82% and an average score of 7.00/10 based on 17 reviews. The site's critical consensus reads: "A rousing if faintly recycled reincarnation of King Kong's latest cinematic foray, Skull Island succeeds in its aim of putting a more adult twist on Saturday morning cartoons of yore". Metacritic, which uses a weighted average, assigned a score of 51 out of 100 based on 4 critics, indicating "mixed or average reviews".

Samantha Nelson of IGN gave 5 out of 10 stating that "Skull Island tries to fuse Kong: Skull Island with Jonny Quest, but dull performances, weak writing, and retreads of fights from the film blunt the pulpy action". Joey Rambles of Cultured Vultures gave it a 7.5 out of 10, writing: "With fun characters, gripping action, and splendid visuals, Skull Island is a highly energized rollercoaster ride that earns its hefty title as well as its place in the MonsterVerse".
