= Stefan Dechant =

American art director and production designer

- Occupation(s): Art director, production designer

Stefan Dechant is an American art director and production designer. He was nominated for an Academy Award in the category Best Production Design for the film The Tragedy of Macbeth.

== Filmography ==
- Kong: Skull Island (2017)
- Pacific Rim: Uprising (2018)
- Welcome to Marwen (2018)
- The Call of the Wild (2020)
- The Tragedy of Macbeth (2021; co-nominated with Nancy Haigh)
- Pinocchio (2022)
- Rebel Moon (2023)
- Godzilla x Kong: Supernova (2027; Filming)
