= David Callaham =

American screenwriter (born 1977)

- Born: David Elias Callaham; October 24, 1977 (age 49); Fresno, California, U.S.
- Education: University of Michigan
- Occupations: Writer; producer
- Spouse: Bree Tichy (m. 2009)
- Writing career
- Years active: 2003–present

David Elias Callaham (born October 24, 1977) is an American writer and producer. He is best known for co-writing the screenplays for the films Doom (2005), The Expendables (2010), Zombieland: Double Tap (2019), Wonder Woman 1984 (2020), Mortal Kombat, Shang-Chi and the Legend of the Ten Rings (both 2021), and Spider-Man: Across the Spider-Verse (2023).

== Life ==
Callaham was born in Fresno, California, on October 24, 1977, to Lee Hsu and Michael Callaham. He has a brother, Gregory. He is of Chinese descent through his mother. He studied English at the University of Michigan and graduated in 1999. In 2009, Callaham married Bree Tichy. They have at least one child. He is a Brown Belt in 10th Planet Jiu-Jitsu under Eddie Bravo.

== Career ==
After reading an article in Penthouse magazine focusing on the lifestyle of Hollywood TV writers, Callaham and a friend moved to Los Angeles with plans to write comedies together. They sent query letters to multiple agencies but never received responses. Callaham worked at Creative Artists Agency for a while, sometimes submitting his material secretly for coverage. In 2002, Callaham wrote Horsemen which was later produced by Michael Bay. In 2003, Callaham wrote the film adaptation of the video game Doom which was released in 2005. Around that time, Callaham wrote Barrow for Warner Bros., a mercenary-inspired action script which later became The Expendables. Callaham was credited for story and characters after Sylvester Stallone used Callaham's Barrow script as a "starting point" for The Expendables. In 2010, Legendary Pictures hired Callaham to write the first draft for Godzilla, for which he received a story credit. In 2014, Callaham completed a production rewrite for Ant-Man, and in 2019, he co-wrote the Zombieland sequel, Zombieland: Double Tap, for Sony. He also worked on the yet-unproduced Jackpot for Focus Features and America: The Motion Picture for Netflix.

In October 2016, Universal Pictures hired Callaham to rewrite The Wolf Man for their Dark Universe. In September 2017, Patty Jenkins hired Callaham to write the script for Wonder Woman 1984 with her and Geoff Johns. In November 2018, Sony Pictures Animation hired Callaham to write a sequel to Spider-Man: Into the Spider-Verse. The following month, Marvel Studios hired Callaham to write the screenplay for a film based on Shang-Chi. The film had its world premiere on August 16, 2021, and was released on September 3, 2021. In April 2020, Callaham was announced as the writer of Walt Disney Pictures' live-action remake of Hercules. In June 2022, it was reported that he left the project. In January 2022, Callaham was announced to have written the latest draft of screenplay of the Masters of the Universe reboot for Netflix, along with Aaron and Adam Nee. On May 1, 2024, it was confirmed that the Masters of the Universe film would now be released through Amazon MGM Studios and Mattel Films and would be directed by Travis Knight with a screenplay written by Chris Butler that would be based on the initial draft written by Callaham and Aaron and Adam Nee.

On May 10, 2024, Callaham was announced as the writer for Godzilla x Kong: Supernova; Callaham had previously written the early drafts for Godzilla (2014).

== Lawsuit ==
In late 2013, the producers of The Expendables, Nu Image and Millennium Films, filed a lawsuit against Callaham and the Writers Guild of America for fraud, unjust enrichment, and declaratory relief over a "flawed and misinformed" Guild arbitration that gave Callaham undeserved writing credit for The Expendables and The Expendables 2. They demanded reimbursements from Callaham for any payments made to him for his fraudulent credit in the two films and to award director, co-writer, and star Sylvester Stallone sole writing credit.

The producers accused Callaham of "subterfuge" by intentionally withholding emails and other correspondences from the WGA screenwriting credit arbitration panel in 2009 that reportedly reveal how very little Callaham was involved with The Expendables. The producers also attempted to legally block a WGA arbitration meeting that was to take place on January 31, 2014, however, a judge denied their request; the meeting was to discuss bonus money and interests owed to Callaham for The Expendables 2. Similarly, writer Marcus Webb filed a lawsuit against the producers, Callaham, and Stallone in October 2011, claiming that The Expendables was based on his mercenary script The Cordoba Caper. However, Stallone's lawyers countered at the time that The Expendables was based on Callaham's script Barrow, originally written for Warner Bros. and provided to Stallone by his agent. Stallone had even provided a sworn declaration, stating, "In those rewrites, I kept Callaham’s story about a group of highly trained mercenaries overthrowing the dictator of a Latin America island."

In December 2012, U.S. District Judge Jed Rakoff noted, during a ruling in the Webb case, the hypocrisy from Stallone's comments, pointing out a signed letter during his own WGA arbitration claiming that The Expendables was original and did not repurpose anything from Callaham's Barrow. Rakoff then dismissed Webb's case, stating that he failed to provide "striking similarities" between The Cordoba Caper and The Expendables. Webb later re-appealed on January 15, 2014, weeks after Nu Image's lawsuit against Callaham and the WGA. Webb's attorneys pointed out the contradictions from the producers of The Expendables, who previously offered evidence that the film was and was not based on Callaham's Barrow.

On March 31, 2014, Nu Image and Millennium Films reached an undisclosed conditional settlement with Callaham.

== Filmography ==
=== Films ===
Year	Title	Credit	Notes	Ref(s)
2005	Doom	Screenplay by/Story by	Co-wrote with Wesley Strick	
2009	Horsemen	Written by		
2009	Tell-Tale	Screenplay by		
2010	The Expendables	Screenplay by/Story by	Co-wrote with Sylvester Stallone	
2012	The Expendables 2	Based on characters		
2014	Godzilla	Story by		
2014	The Expendables 3	Based on characters		
2015	Ant-Man	Production rewrite	Uncredited	
2019	Zombieland: Double Tap	Written by	Co-wrote with Rhett Reese & Paul Wernick	
2020	Wonder Woman 1984	Screenplay by	Co-wrote with Patty Jenkins & Geoff Johns; credited as Dave Callaham	
2021	Mortal Kombat	Screenplay by	Co-wrote with Greg Russo; credited as Dave Callaham	
2021	America: The Motion Picture	Produced by/Written by	Credited as Dave Callaham	
2021	Shang-Chi and the Legend of the Ten Rings	Screenplay by/Story by	Co-wrote with Destin Daniel Cretton and Andrew Lanham; credited as Dave Callaham	
2023	Spider-Man: Across the Spider-Verse	Written by	Co-wrote with Phil Lord and Christopher Miller; credited as Dave Callaham	
2023	Expend4bles	Based on characters		
2026	Masters of the Universe	Screenplay by	Co-wrote with Christopher John Butler, Aaron Nee, and Adam Nee	
2027	Godzilla x Kong: Supernova	Written by		
2027	Spider-Man: Beyond the Spider-Verse	Written by	Co-wrote with Phil Lord and Christopher Miller	

=== Television ===
Year	Title	Credit	Ref(s)
2016–2017	Jean-Claude Van Johnson	Created by Written by Executive producer	
