= Godzilla vs. Kong =

2021 American film by Adam Wingard

- Theatrical release poster
- Directed by: Adam Wingard
- Screenplay by: Eric Pearson; Max Borenstein
- Story by: Terry Rossio; Michael Dougherty; Zach Shields
- Based on: Godzilla and Mechagodzilla by Toho Co., Ltd.
- Produced by: Thomas Tull; Jon Jashni; Brian Rogers; Mary Parent; Alex Garcia; Eric McLeod
- Starring: Alexander Skarsgård; Millie Bobby Brown; Rebecca Hall; Brian Tyree Henry; Shun Oguri; Eiza González; Julian Dennison; Lance Reddick; Kyle Chandler; Demián Bichir
- Cinematography: Ben Seresin
- Edited by: Josh Schaeffer
- Music by: Tom Holkenborg
- Production company: Legendary Pictures
- Distributed by: Warner Bros. Pictures (Worldwide); Toho Co., Ltd. (Japan)
- Release dates: March 24, 2021 (International); March 31, 2021 (United States)
- Running time: 113 minutes
- Country: United States
- Language: English
- Budget: $155–200 million (Note: The Numbers reported the production budget to be $155 million. In December 2020, Variety reported the budget to be $160 million, while TheWrap reported the budget to be $165 million. In January 2021, both The Hollywood Reporter and Deadline Hollywood stated the budget to be $200 million. In February 2021, Comingsoon.net also noted the film's budget to be $200 million.)
- Box office: $470 million

Godzilla vs. Kong is a 2021 American monster film directed by Adam Wingard. Produced by Legendary Pictures and distributed by Warner Bros. Pictures, it is a sequel to Kong: Skull Island (2017) and Godzilla: King of the Monsters (2019), and serves as the fourth film in Legendary's Monsterverse franchise, as well as the 36th film in the Godzilla franchise (Note: It is the fourth Godzilla film to be completely produced by an American studio. The American releases of Godzilla (Godzilla, King of the Monsters!), King Kong vs. Godzilla, and The Return of Godzilla (Godzilla 1985) featured additional footage produced by independent American studios. The footage featured Western actors and merged it with the original Japanese footage in order to appeal to American audiences. Invasion of Astro-Monster was the first Godzilla film to be co-produced between a Japanese studio (Toho) and an American studio (UPA). The 1998 film Godzilla produced by TriStar Pictures is the first Godzilla film to be completely produced by an American studio.) and the 12th film in the King Kong franchise. The film stars Alexander Skarsgård, Millie Bobby Brown, Rebecca Hall, Brian Tyree Henry, Shun Oguri, Eiza González, Julian Dennison, Lance Reddick, Kyle Chandler, and Demián Bichir. Brown and Chandler reprise their roles from the previous Godzilla film. In the film, Godzilla repeatedly clashes with Kong after the organization Monarch moves the ape from Skull Island to a new home in the Hollow Earth; while another organization, Apex Cybernetics, attempts to retrieve a power source in the Hollow Earth for a secret weapon intended to stop Godzilla's mysterious attacks.

The project was announced in October 2015 when Legendary Pictures declared plans for a shared cinematic universe between Godzilla and King Kong. The film's writers' room was assembled in March 2017, and Wingard was announced as the director in May 2017. Principal photography began in November 2018 in Hawaii, Australia, and Hong Kong, and wrapped in April 2019.

After being delayed from a November 2020 release date due to the COVID-19 pandemic, Godzilla vs. Kong was theatrically released internationally on March 24, 2021, and in the United States on March 31, where it was released on HBO Max simultaneously. The film received generally positive reviews from critics, with praise for the visual effects and action sequences, but criticism towards the human characters. It broke several pandemic box office records, and grossed $470 million worldwide, against a production budget between $155–200 million and a break-even point of $330 million, making it the eighth-highest-grossing film of 2021. The film was a streaming hit, becoming the most successful launch title in HBO Max's history until it was overtaken by Mortal Kombat.

A sequel, Godzilla x Kong: The New Empire, also directed by Wingard, was released on March 29, 2024.

== Plot ==
Five years after the three headed dragon-like extraterrestrial, King Ghidorah, awakened giant monsters, known as "Titans", and was defeated by Godzilla, (Note: As depicted in Godzilla: King of the Monsters (2019)) Kong is monitored by Monarch within a giant dome on Skull Island, which has been struck by a perpetual storm. Jia, the last Iwi native and young adopted daughter of Kong expert Ilene Andrews, visits Kong. Jia is deaf and communicates using American Sign Language. Andrews grows concerned that the storm will eventually consume the island, but she dismisses ideas to move Kong to a new home, fearing that Godzilla would come for him once he leaves the island.

Apex Cybernetics employee and Titan conspiracy podcast host Bernie Hayes extracts data suggesting sinister activities at Apex's Pensacola facility. Godzilla suddenly attacks the facility and Bernie stumbles on a massive device emitting a beacon during the rampage. Madison Russell, a listener to Bernie's podcast, enlists her friend Josh Valentine to investigate Godzilla's attacks.

Apex CEO Walter Simmons recruits former Monarch scientist and Hollow Earth theorist Nathan Lind to guide a search for a power source into the Hollow Earth, the Titans' home land. Lind is hesitant as his brother died in a previous expedition to the Hollow Earth due to a strong reverse-gravitational effect. He agrees after Walter reveals that Apex has developed HEAVs (Hollow Earth Anti-gravitational Vehicles), specialized craft able to withstand the gravity field.

Lind convinces Andrews to let Kong guide them via an entrance in Antarctica. Lind, Andrews, and an Apex team led by Walter's daughter Maia board a barge escorted by the US Navy, carrying a sedated and restrained Kong. Godzilla attacks the convoy and defeats Kong, then retreats after the ships trick him into thinking they are destroyed. Kong is airlifted to the Hollow Earth entrance, and the team follows him into the tunnel in the HEAVs.

Bernie joins Madison and Josh in their investigation. They sneak into the wrecked Apex base, discover a secret underground facility, and become locked into a hyperloop transport to Apex's Hong Kong headquarters where they find a test of Mechagodzilla, which is telepathically controlled by Ren Serizawa, the son of the late Ishirō Serizawa, (Note: Serizawa sacrificed himself to revive Godzilla with a nuclear warhead in Godzilla: King of the Monsters (2019)) via neural networks from the severed head of Ghidorah. (Note: Godzilla tore off Ghidorah’s left head in the ocean in Godzilla: King of the Monsters (2019)) Walter intends to harness the Hollow Earth's energy to overcome Mechagodzilla's power supply limitations.

Inside the Hollow Earth, Kong and the team find an ecosystem similar to Skull Island. In his species' ancestral throne room, they find the remains of an ancient war with Godzilla's kind and a glowing axe made from another of Godzilla's dorsal plates. Identifying the power source, the Apex team sends its signature back to their Hong Kong base despite Andrews' protests. Attracted by Mechagodzilla's activation, Godzilla arrives in Hong Kong and, sensing Kong's presence, blasts a hole through the earth with his atomic breath. After provoking him with gunfire, Maia and the Apex team's HEAV is crushed by Kong. Kong, Andrews, Jia, and Lind ascend to Hong Kong, where Kong engages Godzilla in a final battle. Godzilla emerges victorious, leaving Kong in a bradycardia state.

Madison, Josh, and Bernie are caught by security and taken to Walter, who orders Ren to activate Mechagodzilla. Now possessed by Ghidorah's consciousness, Mechagodzilla kills Walter, electrocutes Ren, attacks Hong Kong, and overpowers Godzilla. Lind revives the dying Kong by detonating the HEAV on his chest, acting like a defibrillator. Jia convinces Kong to help Godzilla, who is nearly killed before Kong saves him. As Mechagodzilla overpowers both Titans, Josh momentarily short-circuits Mechagodzilla's controls with Bernie's liquor. Godzilla charges Kong's axe with his atomic breath, allowing Kong to destroy Mechagodzilla. Madison, Bernie, and Josh reunite with Madison's father, Mark, while Godzilla and Kong acknowledge each other and go their separate ways.

Sometime later, Monarch establishes an observation post in Hollow Earth, where Kong now rules.

== Cast ==
- Alexander Skarsgård as Dr. Nathan Lind:
  A Monarch geologist and chief cartographer who works closely with Kong and charts the mission into the Hollow Earth. Skarsgård described his character as a reluctant hero who is "not an alpha, bad-ass" and "thrown into this very dangerous situation and is definitely not equipped for it." Skarsgård called Nathan an homage to 1980s films like Indiana Jones, Romancing the Stone, Lethal Weapon, and Die Hard. Skarsgård prepped for the film by researching the Hollow Earth, and learning American Sign Language to communicate with Kaylee Hottle.
- Millie Bobby Brown as Madison Russell:
  The daughter of Monarch scientists Mark and the late Emma Russell. Madison believes there is a reason for Godzilla's erratic behavior, suspecting a conspiracy formulated by the Apex Cybernetics. She proceeds to investigate with Josh Valentine and Bernie Hayes. Brown described the film as a coming of age story for Madison, noting that the character has "grown-up" and become more "independent" since the events of the previous film, stating, "Her storyline has definitely evolved greatly in the way she deals with things, her attitude towards life, how much more stronger [sic] of a person." Producer Alex Garcia described Madison as the "advocate for Godzilla in this film" who tries to "vindicate" Godzilla and his reasons.
- Rebecca Hall as Dr. Ilene Andrews:
  A Monarch anthropological linguist, and Jia's adoptive mother. Hall described her participation as "overwhelming" due to the film being her first project after her pregnancy, but found the experience "thrilling". Hall described Ilene as "the Jane Goodall of Kong".
- Brian Tyree Henry as Bernie Hayes:
  An Apex Cybernetics technician turned conspiracy theorist and whistleblower aiding Madison and Josh to expose Apex. Henry described Bernie as a "crackpot" with a level of "heart" and "loyalty". Henry noted that the tragic death of Bernie's wife shaped him to become a conspiracy theorist with a podcast and further elaborated, "his goal is to use the tools at his disposal to bring the truth to the people. I always refer to Bernie as Anonymous. He can see the injustices, but no one really listens to him." Due to Bernie's protective nature of Madison and Josh, Henry jokingly likened Bernie to Brienne of Tarth.
- Shun Oguri as Ren Serizawa:
  The son of the late Monarch scientist Ishirō Serizawa, and Apex's chief technology officer, who is the telepathic pilot for Mechagodzilla. Oguri described Ren's goal as trying to "protect the Earth"; however, the means to his goal differ from "everyone else, and his father." Oguri noted that Ren "sort of" followed in his father's footsteps but stated, "he doesn't believe he was heard by his father." Wingard stated that the character was underwritten due to a lack of time to explore the character and felt it was interesting to leave him a mystery.
- Eiza González as Maia Simmons:
  A top-tier Apex Cybernetics executive, and Walter Simmons' daughter. González described her role as a "very smart woman behind a company". She described the film as "slightly comedic". González noted having enjoyed the fact that her character was a Latina woman with a high position within a company, and not forced into a stereotype.
- Julian Dennison as Josh Valentine:
  A friend of Madison aiding her and Bernie to investigate the source of Godzilla's erratic behavior. Dennison described his character as a "nerd" and Madison as his "only friend". Dennison called Josh, Madison's "tech wingman", and the "realist in the duo", stating, "he kind of brings it, 'Oh, we shouldn't do that because we'll die.' And she's, 'No, it will be fine.' So, I think they play very well. And they're a very good mix of just craziness." Dennison screen-tested with Brown using scenes from Romeo and Juliet.
- Lance Reddick as Guillerman:
  The director of Monarch. Reddick's role was originally larger, Wingard stated, "There was a scene earlier in the film, a big board room scene where they're setting up the mission. He had a larger role, but ultimately we didn't need that scene." He only appears in two brief scenes.
- Kyle Chandler as Dr. Mark Russell:
  Madison's widowed father, Monarch's deputy director of special projects, and an animal behavior and communication specialist.
- Demián Bichir as Walter Simmons:
  Maia's father, CEO, and founder of Apex Cybernetics, a tech organization invested in trying to solve the Earth's "Titan problem", secretly creating Mechagodzilla to exterminate them. Walter is a visionary entrepreneur and billionaire who wants to help humanity and make the world a safer place, but clashes with Monarch over their differing ideals on what is best for humanity. Producer Alex Garcia said Walter "has risen to a place… in the seats of power, and is wanting to help to stem and stop the madness and the destruction." Garcia stated that Walter is not necessarily a villain or a Machiavellian character but is "a very complex character who believes he's doing the right thing. And he may be, but that's where the mystery at the core of the film comes into play."
- Kaylee Hottle as Jia:
  A young, deaf orphaned Iwi native who forms a special bond with Kong and is Ilene's adopted daughter.

Additionally, Hakeem Kae-Kazim portrays Admiral Wilcox; Ronny Chieng portrays Jay Wayne; John Pirruccello portrays Horace; and Chris Chalk portrays Ben. Allan Henry provided the performance capture for Kong, while animation supervisor Eric Petey provided Kong's full body performance and facial capture for the ocean battle sequence. Zhang Ziyi and Jessica Henwick were cast but did not appear in the final cut of the film, with Ziyi intended to have been reprising her role from Godzilla: King of the Monsters.

== Production ==
=== Crew ===
- Adam Wingard — director
- Jay Ashenfelter — executive producer
- Herbert W. Gains — executive producer
- Dan Lin — executive producer
- Roy Lee — executive producer
- Yoshimitsu Banno — executive producer (posthumous)
- Kenji Okuhira — executive producer
- Jen Conroy — co-producer
- Tamara Kent — co-producer
- Owen Patterson — production designer
- Tom Hammock — production designer
- Ann Foley — costume designer
- John "DJ" DesJardin — visual effects supervisor

Personnel taken from the press release.

=== Development ===
In September 2015, Legendary moved Kong: Skull Island from Universal to Warner Bros., which sparked media speculation that Godzilla and King Kong would appear in a film together. In October 2015, Legendary confirmed that they would unite Godzilla and King Kong in Godzilla vs. Kong, at the time targeted for a May 29, 2020, release. Legendary plans to create a shared cinematic franchise "centered around Monarch" that "brings together Godzilla and Legendary's King Kong in an ecosystem of other giant super-species, both classic and new." Producer Alex Garcia confirmed that the film would not be a remake of King Kong vs. Godzilla, stating, "the idea is not to remake that movie." Executive producer Jay Ashenfelter found the project to be challenging due to Godzilla: King of the Monsters, stating, "it was also such a humongous monster ballet that the question became, what can we do to top that?"

In May 2017, Adam Wingard was announced as the director for Godzilla vs. Kong. Wingard had previously been considered by Peter Jackson to direct a sequel to his 2005 version of King Kong that went unproduced. Wingard was offered the project by Mary Parent, stating, "I jumped at it immediately. Doing both characters in one film, and being the filmmaker who gets to answer the age-old question of 'Who would win?' I couldn't resist." Wingard emphasized his intent for audiences to invest emotionally in the monsters as characters and his goal for the battle to have a definitive victor.

Wingard prepared by watching every Godzilla and King Kong film. Before receiving a script, Wingard had already pictured the final battle taking place in a "synthwave-style futuristic city backdrop." He chose this due to being a fan of electronic video game music and 1980s film scores, he stated, "my vision basically started there. How can we get these two monsters fighting on a synthwave album cover?" Wingard confirmed that the film would tie in with Godzilla: King of the Monsters, be set in modern times, and feature a "more rugged, a bit more aged Kong."

Wingard cited the 1976 remake of King Kong and Godzilla vs. Destoroyah as touchstones for evoking empathy in the film. Godzilla vs. Mothra, Godzilla vs. Destoroyah, and Shin Godzilla served as inspiration for the monsters' scale. Legendary financed $120 million while Warner Bros. financed $40 million.

=== Writing ===
In March 2017, Legendary assembled a writers room to develop the story for Godzilla vs. Kong, with Terry Rossio (who co-wrote an early unproduced script for TriStar's Godzilla) leading a team consisting of J. D. Payne and Patrick McKay, Lindsey Beer, Cat Vasko, T. S. Nowlin, Jack Paglen, and J. Michael Straczynski. Wingard wanted to craft an outcome that had a definitive winner while allowing the loser to retain their dignity, stating, "they could earn each other's respect." Rossio stated that the intent of the writers room was to "break the story" for Rossio to write a first draft.

Rossio wrote a "detailed treatment" that was green lit by Legendary during the first draft stage. Rossio structured the story in a way that audiences would not have an implicit bias towards either monster, emphasizing that both characters are dangerous monsters misunderstood by humanity, he added, "Kong calls to mind the dangers inherent in unfettered emotion, while Godzilla can be seen to represent the fundamental power of nature. That puts them on pretty equal footing." On his experience with the writers room, Rossio stated, "Godzilla vs. Kong was my first experience running a writer's room, and it was fantastic. It was a blast reading samples, meeting different writers, and crafting a story in a group setting. It felt similar to animation, where the film is happening up on the walls, and the end result is better than any one person could accomplish on their own." According to Wingard, Rossio later likened the treatment to a proposal where the ideas were not completely defined but had potential to work. Wingard admitted to imitating Rossio's treatment-proposal method for later projects like Face/Off 2.

In July 2017, Wingard spoke about the outline created by the writers room, stating, "We're going in very great detail through all the characters, the arcs they have, how they relate to one another, and most importantly how they relate to the monsters, and how the monsters relate to them or reflect them." He stated that he and his team are going "beat by beat" on the outline, stating, "So once again, it's a discussion, and about feeling out how to make it as strong as possible, so that when Terry [Rossio] goes to write the screenplay, he has a definitive breakdown of what to include."

Michael Dougherty, who directed Godzilla: King of the Monsters, and Zach Shields, who co-wrote the film with Dougherty, provided rewrites to ensure that certain themes from King of the Monsters were carried over and that some characters were properly developed. Dougherty revealed how he wrote for the title characters, and how the film would address their differing interactions with people. For Kong, Dougherty stated the film would feature "those very unique, and even warm, bonding moments" between Kong and humans since they have been a staple of the character since the original 1933 film. For Godzilla, his connection to humans would be "more implied" as his softer side is rarely shown. Eric Pearson and Max Borenstein contributed in streamlining the story. Pearson recalled an unused concept where drunks with shotguns attempt to kill a "woolly mammoth thing", only to get crushed. The sequence was intended to allude to the folly of mankind's attempts to challenge the Titans.

Wingard became "very involved" in developing the world-building behind the Hollow Earth plotline. He described the split narrative as a voyage through time and an exploration of the past and future, noting how Madison, Josh, and Bernie uncover tech that should not exist while the others uncover the origins of the Titans and humanity in the Hollow Earth. Wingard noted that similarities between Madison and Bernie and how their mission created a "Goonies-esque adventure", stating it "was a nice seasoning so we didn't get bogged down in a single tone." Rossio found Madison's arc as a "clear build" from the previous film, feeling it made sense for her to be assertive and have insight into Godzilla's actions. Pearson compared Madison to Indiana Jones due to her reckless nature, describing her as the "indisputable captain" of the team. Borenstein had originally written Mechagodzilla into Godzilla: King of the Monsters. Co-writer and director Dougherty scrapped the character during development.

In April 2022, Eiza González revealed that much of the original story, including an alternate storyline for Gonzalez' character, was changed during post-production, including completely cutting Jessica Henwick's character that affected several characters. Gonzalez iterated that the changes were made so the story would service Godzilla and Kong and expressed gratitude for her participation.

=== Casting ===
In June 2017, it was announced that Zhang Ziyi had joined Legendary's Monsterverse, having a reportedly "pivotal" role in both Godzilla: King of the Monsters and Godzilla vs. Kong, though she ultimately starred only in the former. In June 2018, Julian Dennison was cast, while Millie Bobby Brown and Kyle Chandler were set to reprise their roles from Godzilla: King of the Monsters. Legendary also sent an offer to Frances McDormand for a role. In July 2018, it was revealed that Danai Gurira was in early talks to join the film.

In October 2018, Brian Tyree Henry, Demián Bichir, Alexander Skarsgård, Eiza González, and Rebecca Hall were added to the cast. In November 2018, Jessica Henwick, Shun Oguri, and Lance Reddick were cast, with Oguri making his Hollywood debut. Gurira was briefly named amongst the cast by Collider and ScreenGeek, though neither she nor Henwick appeared in the finished film. YouTuber and filmmaker James Rolfe was offered a potential cameo by Wingard, but production pressures and the birth of his second daughter meant it was not able to be arranged.

=== Filming ===
Principal photography began on November 12, 2018, in Hawaii and Australia, and was expected to end in February 2019, under the working title Apex. Production was initially slated to begin on October 1, 2018. For the Hawaii shoot, the crew filmed on the USS Missouri, at Manoa Falls, and in Downtown Honolulu. The crew established a camp in the Kalanianaole Highway, closing Lānaʻi Lookout parking until November 21. Local crews and extras were used for the film. In January 2019, filming resumed in Gold Coast, Queensland at Village Roadshow Studios for an additional 26 weeks.

Filming locations in Australia included Miami State High School and parts of Brisbane such as the Newstead suburb, the Chinatown Mall in Fortitude Valley, and the Wickham Terrace Car Park. In April 2019, Wingard confirmed via Instagram that filming in Australia had wrapped. That same month, Wingard revealed Hong Kong as one of the final shooting locations and that principal photography had wrapped.

Wingard wanted to film in physical locations as much as possible and only filmed on sets when physical locations were not viable. Producer Eric McLeod noted that this was due to Wingard wanting to convey "scale and scope" with real locations. McLeod noted that the crew had more sets and limited space (six to seven stages) while filming at Village Roadshow Studios. The crew had to constantly rotate the set and rework their schedules in order to finish on time. Wingard revealed several setbacks that the crew faced: a viral outbreak (not COVID-19-related) that affected 40 percent of the crew and forced them out of commission for a week, the camera operator broke his foot on the third day of filming, and a spider bite forced Ben Seresin to seek hospital attention.

=== Post-production ===
Co-producer Tamara Kent was in charge of guiding the post-production schedule and delivering the visual effects on time and under budget. Moving Picture Company (MPC), Scanline VFX, and Weta Digital were hired to create the visual effects. Kent stated that the effects could not be done with only two effects studios due to the short time given at the time. Kent noted that one consideration given was to have animation work divided via monsters: one company gets Godzilla, while the other gets Kong. That idea was dropped because it "didn't make sense", Kent explained, "they would need to be created by the same team in shots where they fought. So we divided things by location." MPC animated parts of the Hong Kong sequence, Weta animated all of the Hollow Earth sequences, and Scanline animated a majority of the Hong Kong sequence and all of the film's water environments. The effects were originally due in December 2019. The film's delay to a then-November 2020 release date granted the effects team more time. Wingard noted that this gave them more "flexibility" to get the effects "right" due to the film's "980 complicated effects shots".

In April 2021, Wingard verified that there was enough footage for a potential five hour version. He iterated that he had intended for the film to be two hours or under, adding, "For me, this is the version that worked the best, and I don't see any reason to do a director's cut. So yeah, could I make an extremely long director's cut? Absolutely. But I would never want to... For better or worse, this is my movie."

== Music ==
In June 2020, Tom Holkenborg was announced as the film's composer. Wingard met with Holkenborg in 2018, where Holkenborg admitted to recreationally writing music for Godzilla years prior due to being a fan. Holkenborg subsequently began communicating with the director, tweaked the material, and played it for the director, stating that Wingard was "totally in love." Holkenborg requested a bass drum roughly ten feet in diameter, but the builder was only able to scale it down to eight feet. As with Legendary's previous Godzilla trailers, György Ligeti's "Requiem" was used, followed by "Here We Go" by Chris Classic. The song "The Air That I Breathe" by The Hollies was used in the credits scene. The soundtrack was released by WaterTower Music on March 26, 2021.

Wingard felt it was "insincere" to repurpose the themes by Akira Ifukube because he associated them with Toho's Godzilla. Instead, Wingard wished to go in a different direction to create themes that were unique to the Monsterverse's Godzilla, while paying homage to its influences. Holkenborg wanted to create a Godzilla theme that "lived and breathed" the history behind monster themes. Lower brass and big tympanis were used to emphasize the power of Godzilla. Holkenborg wanted Godzilla's theme to be slow and sluggish to reflect Godzilla.

For the film's Japanese release, Man with a Mission contributed the track "Into the Deep". Regarding the track's inclusion, Wingard commented, "I'm thrilled that an inspiring song from a groundbreaking band like Man with a Mission will be playing alongside the battle in Godzilla vs. Kong."

== Release ==
=== Marketing ===
In May 2019, the first promotional one-sheet poster was revealed at the Licensing Expo, and in June 2019, Warner Bros screened an early look to European exhibitors at CineEurope. In August 2019, it was announced that Disruptor Beam would develop a mobile game to tie in for the film's release. In December 2019, a brief clip was revealed during a Warner Bros. reel at Comic Con Experience, and later leaked online. In January 2020, images from the Hong Kong Toys & Games Fair displaying figures related to the film were leaked online. In February 2020, Toho and Legendary announced the Godzilla vs. Kong Publishing Program and licensees. Through the publishing program, Legendary planned to release two graphic novels, one following Godzilla and the other following Kong, an art book, novelizations, and a children's book. Amongst the licensees named were Playmates Toys, Bioworld, Rubies, Funko, 60Out, and the Virtual Reality Company.

In April 2020, images of toy figures were leaked online, revealing different forms for Godzilla and Kong, Mechagodzilla, and a new monster named Nozuki. In July 2020, images of Playmate figures and packaging with concept art were released online. In December 2020, brief clips from the film were shown during Comic Con Experience, and in January 2021, more brief footage was included in a preview for HBO Max. That same month, the first teaser poster was released online, along with confirmation of the trailer's release date. The first full trailer was released on January 24, 2021. It became Warner Bros' biggest trailer debut, earning 25.6 million views in 24 hours on YouTube; 15.8 million from Warner's channel and an additional 9.8 million views from the studio's secondary channels. The film had its first official NFT art release in collaboration with a major studio. On April 7, the professional wrestling show AEW Dynamite (airing on WarnerMedia-owned channel TNT) held a special Godzilla vs. Kong-themed match.

Forbes reported that the film cost $70 million to promote.

=== Theatrical and streaming ===
Godzilla vs. Kong was theatrically released internationally, beginning on March 24, 2021. It was then released in the United States on March 31, simultaneously in theaters and on HBO Max, where it streamed exclusively for a month. The film was scheduled to be released in Japan on May 14, 2021, by Toho; however, Toho announced on April 30, 2021, that the film's Japanese release had been postponed indefinitely due to COVID-19. The film had its Japanese premiere on June 28, 2021, and was theatrically released in Japan on July 2, 2021.

Regal Cinemas began exhibiting the film with a limited release upon its reopening on April 2, 2021, following its closure due to the COVID-19 pandemic. The film was delayed several times, and was previously scheduled to be released in 2020 on March 13, May 22, May 29, and November 20, and later pushed to May 21, 2021, due to the COVID-19 pandemic. In February 2020, Warner Bros. hosted an unannounced test screening which received a "mostly positive" response.

In November 2020, The Hollywood Reporter confirmed that the film was being considered for a streaming release. Netflix had offered $200–250 million but WarnerMedia blocked the deal in favor of their own offer to release the film on HBO Max. Warner Bros. iterated that their theatrical release plans would proceed as scheduled. WarnerMedia CEO Jason Kilar and Warner Bros. chairman Ann Sarnoff considered options that included a simultaneous theatrical and streaming release, a strategy that Warner Bros. had done for Wonder Woman 1984. In December 2020, Warner Bros. announced that the film, along with their other tentpoles scheduled for 2021, would be given same-day simultaneous releases in theaters and HBO Max, with one-month access for its streaming release.

A few days after the announcement, Variety and Deadline Hollywood reported that Legendary Entertainment, financiers, and talent with backend deals were not pleased with WarnerMedia's multi-release plans and non-transparent intentions. Legendary was not given advanced notice of the multi-release decision nor given a say in how Dune and Godzilla vs. Kong would be distributed. The studio planned to have discussions with Warner Bros. regarding a more "generous deal"; however, legal action was considered. A few weeks later, Deadline reported that the film could keep its HBO Max release but only if Warner Bros. matches Netflix's $250 million bid. In January 2021, The Hollywood Reporter revealed that a legal battle was averted due to Legendary and WarnerMedia nearing an agreement to keep the film's simultaneous release.

=== Home media ===
The film was released on digital platforms on May 21, 2021, and on DVD, Blu-ray, 3D Blu-ray, and 4K Blu-ray on June 15, 2021. The film was re-added to HBO Max on August 17, 2021. In the United States and Canada, the DVD earned $13.2 million and the Blu-ray earned $22.8 million, totaling $36 million in domestic video sales.

== Reception ==
=== Audience viewership ===
Following its opening weekend, Warner Bros. said the film had a "larger viewing audience than any other film or show on HBO Max since launch." Samba TV reported that 3.6 million households watched at least the first five minutes of the film in the United States between March 31–April 4, and 225,000 in the UK. It was watched in 5.1 million households in the US over the first 17 days, and in over 5.8 million US households by the end of its first 30 days. In January 2022, tech firm Akamai reported that Godzilla vs. Kong was the most pirated film of 2021.

=== Box office ===
Godzilla vs. Kong grossed $101 million in the United States and Canada, and $369 million in other territories, for a worldwide total of $470 million. Variety reported the film needed to gross at least $330 million in order to break even. Deadline Hollywood estimated it would turn a net profit of $96.4 million, when factoring together all expenses and revenue.

A week prior to its United States release, the film was released in 38 overseas countries and was projected to gross around $70 million over its first five days. In China, where it was projected to debut to around $50 million, the film made $21.5 million (RMB 140 million) on its first day. The film exceeded predictions and debuted to $123.1 million worldwide, the biggest worldwide opening of the pandemic for a Hollywood film. Its largest markets were China ($69.2 million; RMB 450.5 million), Mexico ($6.5 million), Australia ($6.3 million), Russia ($5.9 million), Taiwan ($5.3 million), India ($4.9 million), Thailand ($3.3 million), South Korea ($2.8 million), Vietnam ($2.5 million), Malaysia ($2.1 million), and Spain ($1.7 million). In Indonesia, the film earned $850,000 (Rp. 12.3 billion).

In the United States and Canada, Godzilla vs. Kong was initially projected to gross around $23 million over its five-day opening weekend, compared to expectations of around $68 million in a pre-COVID marketplace. It made $9.6 million from 2,409 theaters in its first day, the best opening-day figure of the pandemic. After grossing $6.7 million on its second day, five-day projections were increased to $30–40 million. Playing in 3,064 theaters by Friday, the film went on to debut to $31.6 million in three days, and $48.1 million over five, the best opening weekend of the pandemic. Collider attributed the film's box office results to "positive word-of-mouth". The film grossed $13.9 million in its second weekend, remaining in first and becoming the highest-grossing domestic release of the pandemic (passing Tenet's $58.5 million). During the weekend ending on June 20, 2021, Godzilla vs. Kong became the second film to cross the $100 million mark at the United States and Canadian box office during the COVID-19 pandemic, following A Quiet Place Part II.

=== Critical response ===
Godzilla vs. Kong received generally positive reviews from critics. On the review aggregator website Rotten Tomatoes, 76% of 391 critics' reviews are positive, with an average rating of 6.4/10. The website's consensus reads: "Delivering squarely on its title, Godzilla vs. Kong swats away character development and human drama to deliver all the spectacle you'd expect from giant monsters slugging it out." Metacritic, which uses a weighted average, assigned the film a score of 59 out of 100, based on 57 critics, indicating "mixed or average" reviews. Audiences polled by CinemaScore gave the film an average grade of "A" on an A+ to F scale (the highest of the Monsterverse), while PostTrak reported 86% of audience members gave it a positive score, with 74% saying they would definitely recommend it.

Richard Roeper of the Chicago Sun-Times gave the film 3 out of 4 stars, writing, "Godzilla vs. Kong is the kind of movie you can pretty much forget about almost instantly after you've seen it—but it's also the kind of movie that makes you forget about everything else in your life while you're watching it." Jamie Graham of Total Film gave the film 3 out of 5 stars, writing, "Watching these famous monsters share the screen for the first time since 1963's King Kong vs. Godzilla, in a series of expertly choreographed battles, packs real wallop, even if you can't help wishing that screen was 30ft high at your local cinema."

Alonso Duralde of the TheWrap said that the franchise had "given up on everything but the monster fights" and wrote, "Yes, obviously, no one goes to these movies for the deep human characters or for plot machinations or even for the metaphors about the environment and industrialization. Here's the thing, though—they come in handy to fill in the gaps between the monster battles, and you miss them when they're not there. And since even those battles are somewhat perfunctory, what are we even doing here?" John Nugent of Empire gave the film 2 out of 5 stars, writing, "Godzilla vs. Kong mostly delivers on its promise of a big monster fighting another big monster. It just depends whether you're willing to sit through the toe-curlingly bad set-up that surrounds it." Reviewing for The Age, Jake Wilson gave the film 2.5 out of 5 stars, saying, "Overseeing the mayhem is director Adam Wingard, who started out making wittily brutal low-budget horror films before becoming a studio gun for hire. Absolutely no sign of his old personality is evident here."

The film ranks on Rotten Tomatoes' Best Science Fiction Movies of 2021.

=== Accolades ===
The film was Honored by Seal of Authentic Representation from the Ruderman Family Foundation for Hottle's role as Jia. The seal is Honored Kaylee Hottle with disabilities who uses sign language to communicate with the latter creature.

Award	Date of ceremony	Category	Recipient(s)	Result	Ref(s)
Australian Effects & Animation Festival	August 23, 2021	Weta Digital for Feature Film – VFX	Godzilla vs. Kong	Gold	
Australian Effects & Animation Festival	August 23, 2021	MPC Film for Feature Film – Sequence	‘Hong Kong Battle’ sequence	Silver	
Las Vegas Film Critics Society Awards	December 13, 2021	Best Visual Effects	Godzilla vs Kong	Nominated	
Las Vegas Film Critics Society Awards	December 13, 2021	Best Horror/Sci-Fi Film	Godzilla vs Kong	Nominated	
Chinese American Film Festival	November 5, 2021	Most Popular US Film in China	Godzilla vs Kong	Won	
Dragon Awards	September 7, 2021	Best Science Fiction or Fantasy Movie	Godzilla vs Kong	Nominated	
Denver Film Critics Society	January 20, 2022	Best Visual Effects	Godzilla vs Kong	Nominated	
DiscussingFilm Critic Awards	January 4, 2022	Best Visual Effects	Godzilla vs Kong	Nominated	
Golden Schmoes Awards	December 13, 2021	Best Visual Effects	Godzilla vs Kong	Nominated	
Golden Schmoes Awards	December 13, 2021	Best Sci-Fi Movie of the Year	Godzilla vs Kong	Nominated	
Golden Schmoes Awards	December 13, 2021	Favorite Poster Movie of the Year	Godzilla vs Kong	Nominated	
Golden Schmoes Awards	December 13, 2021	Best Action Sequence of the Year	Godzilla & Kong vs Mechagodzilla	Nominated	
Minnesota Film Critics Alliance	March 8, 2022	Best Visual Effects	Godzilla vs Kong	Nominated	
North Carolina Film Critics Association	January 5, 2022	Ken Hanke Memorial Tar Heel Award	Brian Tyree Henry (shared with Eternals and The Woman in the Window) – From Fayetteville, North Carolina	Nominated	
People's Choice Awards	December 7, 2021	The Action Movie of 2021	Godzilla vs Kong	Nominated	
Portland Critics Association	December 17, 2021	Best Visual Effects	Godzilla vs Kong	Nominated	
Portland Critics Association	December 17, 2021	Best Science Feature	Godzilla vs Kong	Nominated	
Visual Effects Society	March 8, 2022	Outstanding Visual Effects in a Photoreal Feature	John "D.J." Des Jardin, Tamara Kent, Bryan Hirota, Kevin Smith, Mike Meinardus	Nominated	
Visual Effects Society	March 8, 2022	Outstanding Virtual Cinematography in a CG Project	Shawn Hull, Robert Wiese, Steven Tom, Eric Petey (for Ocean Battle)	Nominated	
Visual Effects Society	March 8, 2022	Outstanding Effects Simulations in a Photoreal Feature	Jonathan Freisler, Nahuel Alberto Letizia, Eloi Andaluz Fullà, Saysana Rintharamy (for Ocean Water & Battle Destruction)	Nominated	
Hollywood Professional Association Awards	November 18, 2021	Outstanding Sound – Feature Film	Tom Ozanich, Dean A. Zupancic, Erik Aadahl, Ethan Van der Ryn, and Jason W. Jennings	Nominated	
Hollywood Professional Association Awards	November 18, 2021	Outstanding Visual Effects – Feature Film	Pier Lefebvre, Michael Langford, Timucin Ozger, Sarang Deshpande, and Joshua Toonen	Nominated	
Satellite Awards	April 2, 2022	Best Visual Effects	John Desjardin, Bryan Hirota, Tamara Watts Kent, and Kevin Smith	Nominated	
Saturn Awards	October 25, 2022	Best Science Fiction Film	Godzilla vs. Kong	Nominated	
Saturn Awards	October 25, 2022	Best Special / Visual Effects	John "D.J." Des Jardin, Bryan Hirota, Kevin Andrew Smith, Pier Lefebvre, and Mike Meinardus	Won	

== Sequel ==
In March 2022, it was announced that a sequel to Godzilla vs. Kong was scheduled to commence filming later in the year in Gold Coast, Queensland and other locations in South East Queensland. In May 2022, it was announced that Wingard would return to direct and that Dan Stevens had been cast in the lead. Hall, Henry and Hottle would also return to reprise their roles. Wingard and Stevens had previously worked together on The Guest. The film was theatrically released internationally on March 27, 2024 and in the United States on March 29, 2024.

== See also ==
- List of films featuring the deaf and hard of hearing
- Subterranean fiction
- King Kong vs. Godzilla

== Sources ==
- Holkenborg, Tom (2021). Godzilla's Theme – Godzilla vs. Kong [Studio Time: S4E3] (YouTube Video). Junkie XL.
- Kalat, David (2010). A Critical History and Filmography of Toho's Godzilla Series (Second ed.). McFarland. ISBN 9780786447497.
- Mirjahangir, Chris (2019). Interview with Alex Garcia and Zach Shield (Audio). Toho Kingdom.
- "UNTITLED GODZILLA VS KONG SEQUEL Feature Film". Production Weekly. No. 1299. May 19, 2022.
- Ryfle, Steve (1998). Japan's Favorite Mon-Star: The Unauthorized Biography of the Big G. ECW Press. ISBN 1550223488.
- Wallace, Daniel (2021). Godzilla vs. Kong: The Art of the Ultimate Battle Royale. Insight Editions. ISBN 9781647221409.
