= We Sold Our Souls =

2018 novel by Grady Hendrix

- Author: Grady Hendrix
- Audio read by: Carol Monda
- Language: English
- Genre: Horror
- Publisher: Quirk Books
- Publication date: 2018
- Publication place: United States
- Media type: Print, ebook, audiobook
- Pages: 336 pages
- ISBN: 9781683690122
- Preceded by: Paperbacks from Hell
- Followed by: The Southern Book Club's Guide to Slaying Vampires

We Sold Our Souls is a 2018 horror novel by American writer Grady Hendrix. It was first published in the United States in print, ebook, and audiobook formats by Quirk Books on September 18, 2018. The novel centers upon a metal guitarist who discovers that her soul was sold by a former bandmate in order to achieve success.

== Synopsis ==
Kris is a downtrodden woman barely making a living by working at a Best Western. She wasn't always like this, as back in the nineties she was a guitarist for the heavy metal band Dürt Würk. The band was steadily growing in popularity and seemed like it was just about to make it to the big time when the band's lead singer Terry Hunt left to become a solo artist, leaving his former friends behind. Kris's unhappiness and anger grows when she discovers that Terry sold her soul for his success. Determined to confront the person who left her with nothing, Kris decides to travel to Las Vegas to confront Terry.

== Reception ==
Critical reception has been mostly positive. We Sold Our Souls was reviewed by SFX, which wrote that it "doesn't have the flair and originality of Hendrix's ingenious Horrorstör, nor the sweetness and emotion of My Best Friend's Exorcism, but it's still a compelling romp with a great central character that'll be a treat for music obsessives of all kinds." It was also reviewed by Dread Central and Tor.com, the former of which felt that it was "not just a smart, new look at the trope of the devil (or entities and soul stealing) in regards to music, fame, and fortune, but an indictment on modern society, and how we lose little pieces of ourselves here, there, and everywhere, each day to distractions, materialism, and want of power."
