= Just Salad =

American fast casual restaurant chain

Just Salad, Inc.
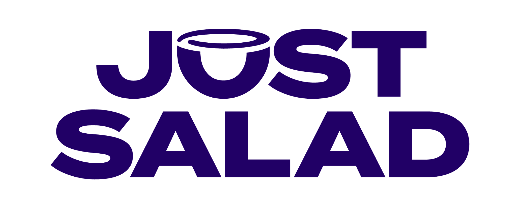
- Type: Private
- Industry: Restaurants
- Genre: Fast casual
- Founded: 2006; 20 years ago in New York City
- Founders: Nick Kenner
- Headquarters: New York, NY, U.S.
- Number of locations: 125 (2026)
- Area served: Connecticut, Florida, Illinois, Massachusetts, New Jersey, New York, Pennsylvania, Washington, DC
- Key people: Nick Kenner, Founder, CEO
- Products: Salads, wraps, smoothies, soups
- Website: justsalad.com

Just Salad is a US-based, fast-casual restaurant chain founded in 2006. Its restaurants serve salads, wraps, rice bowls, house-made dressings, and beverages. As of 2025, it has 100 outlets in the Northeast, Midwest, and South, and is known for its reusable bowls. Nick Kenner is Just Salad's president and CEO.

== History ==
Just Salad was founded in 2006 by Nick Kenner and his childhood friend Rob Crespi, who noticed the lack of healthy, easily accessible eating places in Midtown Manhattan. They raised the startup capital to open their first location that same year.

By 2016, the company had grown to 29 outlets. That year, Panda Restaurant Group, parent company of the Panda Express restaurants, invested an undisclosed sum in Just Salad. Additional funding came in 2021 from Closed Loop Partners, a private investment group that supports companies using sustainable materials and production systems; as well as a further investment round from Panda Restaurant Group. In February 2025, the company announced that it had raised about $200 million from Wellington Management, D1 Capital Partners, Neuberger Berman, and Stripes, reportedly giving Just Salad a valuation of $1 billion.

== Growth ==
The funding in 2016 and 2021 allowed Just Salad to expand. From 47 outlets in 2021, the company doubled its number of restaurants over the next four years. By 2025, Just Salad had 100 locations in seven states, all but two of which were company-owned. As of July 1, 2026, the company had 125 locations, and it was reported that New York Knicks player Jalen Brunson had taken an equity stake in the company.

== Technology ==
In January 2025, as part of its mobile app, Just Salad introduced an artificial intelligence tool based on Open AI's GPT-4o that suggests menu options for customers based on their dietary goals and taste preferences.

== Sustainability ==
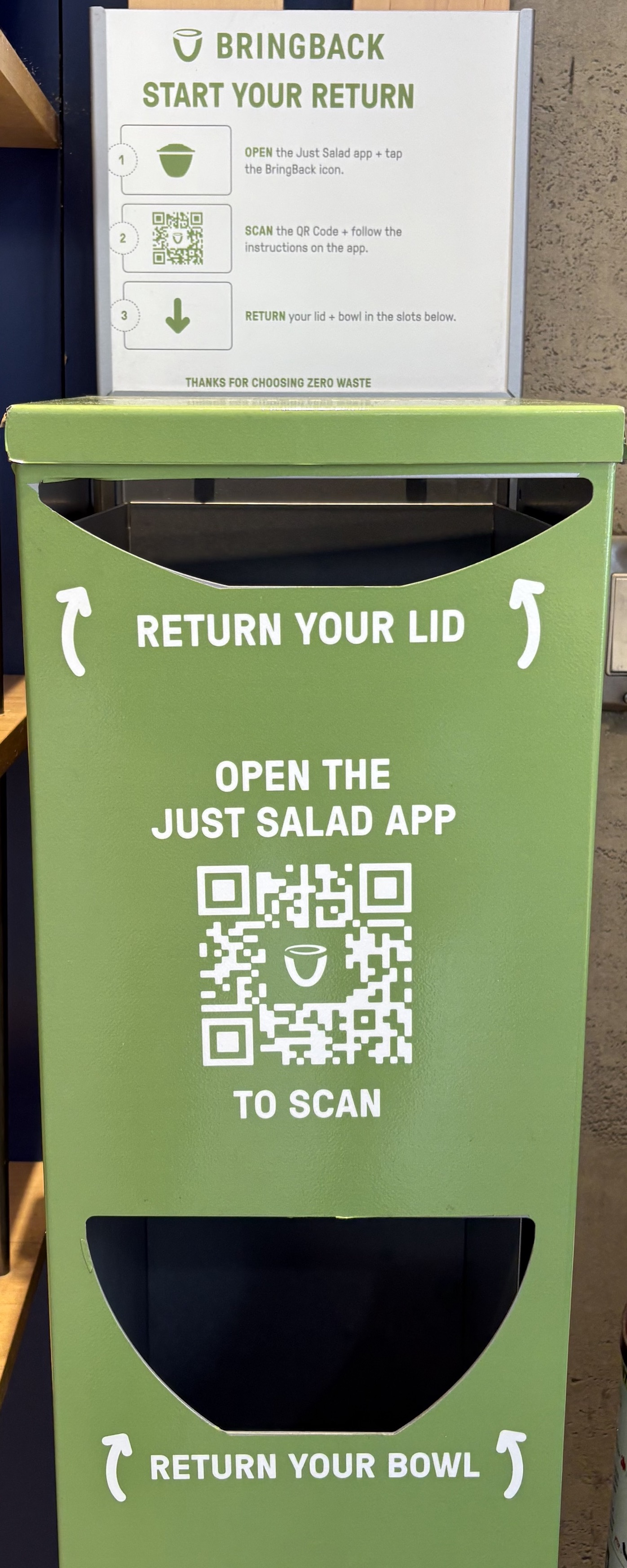
Reusable bowl return bin

MyBowl, the restaurant's reusable bowl program, began in 2006 as part of a company priority to reduce carbon emissions, food waste, and packaging waste. Customers buy a portion-sized bowl from Just Salad and receive a free topping every time they use it to order. In 2021, the company expanded the program to include online ordering, allowing customers who request a reusable bowl to also receive a free topping. These reusable and returnable bowl programs reportedly save an estimated 40 tons of waste per year.

In 2019, the company hired Sandra Noonan, former vice president of Morgan Stanley's Institute for Sustainable Investing, as chief sustainability officer to expand Just Salad's sustainability efforts. The company partners with Planet FWD to measure and reduce the carbon footprint of its menu ingredients, packaging, and other operational areas. Additionally, it sells surplus food via Too Good to Go to reduce waste-related emissions. As of 2020, Just Salad menus have listed the carbon content of each dish, becoming the first restaurant to do so.

In 2023, Just Salad earned a B Corporation certification of sustainability with an overall score of 80.4 out of 100.

== Partnerships ==
- Marc Forgione, Michelin-starred chef and owner of Respect Hospitality Group, to create a mezze salad.
- Amanda Cohen, Michelin-starred chef of Dirt Candy, to create an entirely plant-based salad.
- Sesame Workshop, to create a kid's menu of healthy menu options and provide nutritional eating content.
- Kathryn Kellogg, advocate of sustainability and plastic-free living, founder of Going Zero, and spokesperson for National Geographic, to create a pickle-based salad.
- PanCAN Purple Stride NYC, a leading sponsor of a run-walk race in New York City, to raise funds for pancreatic cancer research.

== Legal issues ==
In 2018, 16 delivery workers sued Just Salad and its CEO, Nick Kenner, in the U.S. Dirtrict Court for the Southern District of New York for wage-related and other employment violations. In 2022, the majority of the charges, including those against Kenner, were dismissed as "moot or without merit". The remainder were settled.
