= Hero Bread =

American food company

- Type: Private
- Industry: Food
- Founded: 2019; 7 years ago
- Founder: Cole Glass
- Headquarters: San Francisco, California
- Area served: United States
- Key people: YuChiang Cheng (CEO)
- Website: hero.co

Hero Bread is an American company that produces low-net-carb baked goods. The brand was founded in 2019 by Cole Glass.

== History ==
Cole Glass, the brand's founder, grew up with multiple food allergies, causing him to become reliant on bread and other baked goods in combination with supplements, leading to the development of the company. In 2017, he began to develop recipes for baked goods that worked with his allergies and met his nutritional needs. In 2019, Glass founded Hero Labs, the company that produces Hero Bread's baked goods. The company's first investor was Great Point Ventures, a venture capital firm, going on to attract additional investors involved with companies like Beyond Meat.

In 2021, Hero Bread began a partnership with Subway. The brand created a version of the Artisan Italian Bread as a lower-calorie option, with the six-inch version containing one gram of net carbs, zero grams of sugar, twelve grams of protein, and twenty-six grams of fiber. The partnership was reportedly paused in 2023 to focus on the company's retail and direct-to-consumer sales online.

In 2023, Hero Bread raised $15 million in Series B funding, backed by Cleveland Avenue, DNS Capital, Union Grove Venture Partners, and the D'Amelio Family Fund through 444 Capital, resulting in $47.5 million in total funding at the time. The company also received additional backing from Tom Brady, Kevin Durant, Rich Kleiman, The Weeknd, and Lil Baby. That same year, the company's products became available in restaurants operated by Just Salad and Freebirds World Burrito, later expanding and partnering with Crisp & Green in 2024. As of 2025, Hero Bread is distributed by approximately 7,000 stores, including Walmart, Whole Foods Market, Safeway, Sprouts and Albertsons.

In 2026, Hero Bread became the jersey sponsor of the Phoenix Mercury.

=== Products ===
Hero Bread's baked goods are made with olive oil and a combination of plant-based proteins and fibers, replacing flour found in traditional baked goods, which was created after two years of experimentation by Glass.

Hero Bread produces white and seeded breads, hamburger and hot dog buns, tortillas, croissants, buttermilk and cheddar biscuits, Hawaiian rolls, scones, bagels, and two types of noodles. The brand is utilized by individuals participating in keto diets, receiving an endorsement from Tom Brady, who is also an investor in the company.
