= Jenna Lamia =

American actress and writer

- Occupations: Actress, writer, voice performer
- Years active: 1998–present

Jenna Lamia is an American actress, writer, and audiobook narrator. She developed the Netflix limited series The Perfect Couple, and also served as its showrunner. She is also known for her role as Judy in the SyFy series Resident Alien, and is a writer on a few episodes.

== Career ==
=== Acting ===
Lamia began her acting career in New York City, where she appeared on Broadway in Eugene O'Neill's Ah, Wilderness! at Lincoln Center. She soon moved on to television and film appearances, and is best known for her roles as Sherri Ward in The Fighter with Mark Wahlberg and Christian Bale, Siobhan Miller in Law and Order: SVU, Carrie Schillinger in Oz, and as Poppy Downes in Comedy Central's Strangers With Candy, with Amy Sedaris. Over the span of her career, she has appeared on and off-Broadway, in over 30 television shows and feature films, and voiced video games and animated characters for film and television. As of 2021, she appears as Judy Cooper in the Syfy television series Resident Alien, starring Alan Tudyk.

=== Audiobook narration ===
As an audiobook narrator, Lamia has won several golden earphones awards from AudioFile magazine, and was named Female Narrator of the Year in 2010 by the Audio Publishers Association. Also in 2010, she won Best Solo Narration - Female for The Chosen One. She voiced Eugenia "Skeeter" Phelan in The Help, which won best fiction audiobook of the year in 2010. In 2020, she won another Audie Award as part of the ensemble cast of Jarrett Krozocska's Hey, Kiddo.

=== Writing and producing ===
Lamia is also a writer and producer of television and films. After selling her first feature script, All About Me, to New Line Cinema in 2006, she joined the writing staff of The CW's 90210. After 90210, Lamia went on to write, produce, and act in Awkward.

She began writing and producing the dramedy No Tomorrow in 2016. In 2017, she began writing and co-executive producing the crime comedy-drama Good Girls for NBC.

In December 2019, it was announced that she would write and executive produce an adaptation of Elin Hilderbrand's novel The Perfect Couple, for the Fox network.

In April 2021, production began on the feature film My Best Friend's Exorcism, which Lamia adapted from the 2016 novel by Grady Hendrix.

In September 2024, Netflix released all six episodes of the limited series The Perfect Couple, which Lamia wrote and executive produced. The series is an adaptation of The New York Times bestselling novel by Elin Hilderbrand, and stars Nicole Kidman, Liev Schreiber, Eve Hewson, Billy Howle, Meghann Fahy, Ishaan Khatter, Donna-Lynn Champlin and Michael Beech. The Perfect Couple was the most-watched American debut series on Netflix in all of 2024, and the second most-watched debut series worldwide.

== Filmography ==
=== Acting ===
Year	Title	Role	Notes
1998	Hi-Life	Girl Teen	
1999	Strangers With Candy	Poppy Downes	Episode: "Old Habits - New Beginnings"
1999	The Guiding Light	Ali	
1999	FANatic	Announcer (all episodes)	
2000	Brutally Normal	Ali	Episode: "Damaged Goods"
2000	Law and Order: Special Victims Unit	Siobhan Miller	Episode: "Taken"
2001	Corkscrew Hill	Paddy McMooney	
2000–2002	Oz	Carrie Schillinger	8 episodes
2003	Happy End	Sparkle	
2004	Without a Trace	Alice Blossom	Episode: "Hawks and Handsaws"
2004	NYPD Blue	Gina Bell	Episode: "Old Yeller"
2004	The Jury	Christine Britton	
2008	Something's Wrong in Kansas	Shelby	
2009	The Box	Diane Carnes	
2010	The Fighter	Sherri Ward	
2012	The Polar Bears	Polar Girl 1	
2013	The Call	Brooke	
2013–2016	Awkward.	Lesley Miller	10 episodes
2016	Family Guy	Mrs. Wong	Episode: "The Boys In The Band"
2018	Dirty John	Laurel	Episode: "One Shoe"
2019	Legend Quest: Masters of Myth	Marcella	
2021–2025	Resident Alien	Judy Cooper	30 episodes
2021	Small Engine Repair	Patty Swaino	

=== Writing ===
==== Television ====
Year	Title	Developer	Writer	Executive producer	Notes
2010–12	90210	No	Yes	No	
2014–16	Awkward.	No	Yes	Co-executive	
2016–17	No Tomorrow	No	Yes	Supervising	
2018–21	Good Girls	No	Yes	Co-executive	
2022	Resident Alien	No	Yes	No	
2024	The Perfect Couple	Yes	Yes	Yes	

==== Film ====
Year	Work	Role
2022	My Best Friend's Exorcism	Screenwriter

== Awards and nominations ==
Year	Award	Nominated work	Result
2003	Audie Award	The Secret Life of Bees	Nominated
2010	Audie Award for best solo narration	The Chosen One	Won
2011	MTV Movie Award for Best Fight	The Fighter	Nominated
2020	Audie Award for best young adult recording. Full cast.	Hey, Kiddo	Won
