= Ellen Goldsmith-Vein =

American television and film producer (born 1963)

- Born: Ellen Lee Goldsmith; November 2, 1963 (age 62); La Jolla, San Diego, California, U.S.
- Education: Hollins University, UCLA
- Occupations: CEO, The Gotham Group
- Spouse: Jon F. Vein
- Children: 2

Ellen Lee Goldsmith-Vein (née Goldsmith; born November 2, 1963) is an American television and film producer. She is the founder and CEO of the Gotham Group, a management company founded in 1993. Goldsmith-Vein is the only woman to own her own management company, and she was the first talent manager ever featured on the cover of the “Power 100” special issue of The Hollywood Reporter in 2006.

== Early life ==
Ellen Lee Goldsmith was born in Los Angeles on November 2, 1963. She was raised in La Jolla, San Diego. She attended Hollins University and graduated from UCLA in 1986 with a Bachelor of Science degree in Sociology and received an honorary Doctor of Laws degree from Hollins University in 2014.

== Career ==
Goldsmith-Vein founded the Gotham Group, a diversified management and production company serving the entertainment industry, in 1993, after the death of her partner in Atlas Management, Stuart Kaplan. Five years later, in 1999, Gotham Group merged with Michael Ovitz's Artist Management Group. As CEO of The Gotham Group, she signed a $300 million contract with the government of South Korea to make eight animated movies in 2008, in conjunction with The Weinstein Company.

Goldsmith-Vein is also a television and film producer. She was nominated for an Emmy Award in 2008 for her work on the television series Creature Comforts, which went on to win an Annie Award. She produced The Maze Runner film series which has grossed $1 billion at the box office worldwide. The third installment of the series, The Death Cure, released on January 26, 2018.

She produced the films Stargirl and the sequel Hollywood Stargirl for Disney+, based on the best-selling work of author Jerry Spinelli, with America's Got Talent winner Grace VanderWaal making her film debut as the eponymous lead, Stargirl Caraway. She produced the animated feature film Wendell & Wild at Netflix in collaboration with Jordan Peele and acclaimed director Henry Selick and starring the voice talent of Key & Peele and Lyric Ross. Goldsmith-Vein/The Gotham Group also produced My Best Friend’s Exorcism, based on the Grady Hendrix novel of the same name, directed by Damon Thomas, and starring Elsie Fisher, Amiah Miller, Cathy Ang, and Rachel Ogechi Kanu for Amazon. Goldsmith-Vein/The Gotham Group will next be producing Justin Lin's upcoming film The Last Days of John Allen Chau which will be directed by Justin Lin. In March 2024 it was announced that Goldsmith-Vein along with Scott Stuber and Eric Robinson would produce the film Deliver Me from Nowhere for 20th Century Studios. The film is based on the book of the same name and is about the recording of Bruce Springsteen's 1982 album, Nebraska. The film will star Jeremy Allen White as Springsteen.

In television, Goldsmith-Vein and Gotham have a first-look deal at 20th Television, a division of The Walt Disney Company. The Gotham Group is currently in production on the animated series The Search for WondLa for Apple, based on Tony DiTerlizzi’s bestselling book trilogy published by Simon & Schuster, and Percy Jackson for Disney+, based on the blockbuster series by Rick Riordan for Hyperion Books. Gotham is also in production on The Spiderwick Chronicles series with Paramount Television, also for Disney+. Gotham is in post-production on Washington Black for Hulu, based on Esi Edugyan’s critically acclaimed novel, alongside Selwyn Hinds and Sterling K. Brown.

== Personal life ==
Ellen Goldsmith-Vein is married to entrepreneur and founder of MarketShare Jon F. Vein. They have a son, Jack, and a daughter, Caroline, and they reside in Hancock Park, Los Angeles. They hosted a US$2,700 fundraiser for Democratic presidential candidate Hillary Clinton's 2016 presidential campaign on February 22, 2016.

Goldsmith-Vein is a political fundraiser. She has served on the Board of NAB/NFC for the Democratic National Committee, is a member of the National Finance Committee for Cory Booker and Los Angeles Mayor Karen Bass, for whom she has been a longtime supporter, and served on the National Finance Committees for Joe Biden, Barack Obama, Hillary Clinton and Kamala Harris. She is a founding member of Barbara Boxer’s PAC for Change (March On) and sits on the Advisory Board of Common Sense Media in Los Angeles. She is a member of the Blue Ribbon of the Los Angeles Music Center along with a past member of the Board of Directors for the Los Angeles Philharmonic. Goldsmith-Vein recently joined the Advisory Board for the Center for Scholars & Storytellers at UCLA and is a longtime advisory board member of Young Storytellers. Ellen was named Animation Is Film’s Person of Distinction in 2023.

She is a member of the Academy of Motion Picture Arts & Sciences and an Academy Gold mentor and judge for AMPAS’ Nicholl Fellowship for screenwriting. She is a member of the National Academy of Television Arts and Science and serves as a mentor for the Junior Hollywood Radio & Television Society. She is a member of the advisory board for 826LA and serves on the Board of Directors of P.S. Arts. She is a past board member of Girls, Inc. – a national non-profit youth organization dedicated to encouraging girls to be "strong, smart, and bold" – and was honored by the organization for her work and contributions to the arts, girls and women. She is also a member of the National Coalition Against Censorship Advisory Council, the Hollywood Radio & Television Society, Women in Animation and ASIFA-Hollywood.
