= Jon F. Vein =

American lawyer

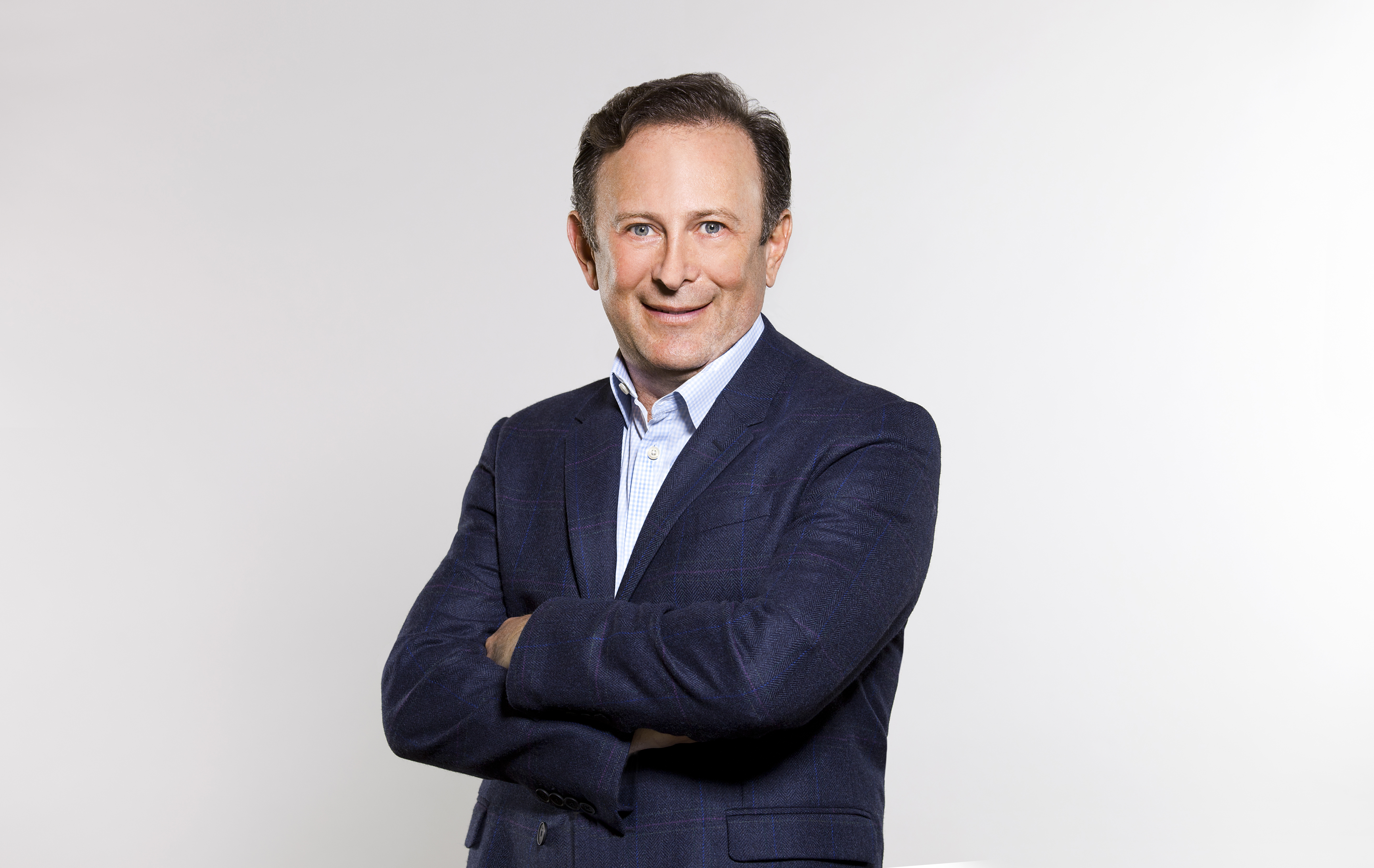
- Born: December 3, 1963 (age 62); Los Angeles, California, U.S.
- Education: University of California, Berkeley; Harvard Law School
- Occupations: Business executive, entrepreneur
- Spouse: Ellen Lee Goldsmith
- Children: 2

Jon F. Vein (born December 3, 1963) is an American business executive and entrepreneur. He has worked in a number of industries, from aerospace and technology to entertainment and the law and in the fields of software and marketing.

== Early life ==
Vein was born to a Jewish family in Los Angeles, California. Raised in Encino, California, he attended Harvard-Westlake School (in North Hollywood, California) and Birmingham High School (in Van Nuys, California).

Vein went on to study at University of California, Berkeley where he double-majored in Electrical Engineering-Computer Science and Materials Science Engineering, graduating with highest honors. At Harvard Law School, he won the Williston Contract Drafting and Negotiation competition and served as the Class of 1989's First Class Marshall, graduating cum laude. He received his Juris Doctor degree from the Harvard Law School in 1989.

== Career ==
Vein co-founded and served as the co-Chief Executive Officer of MarketShare, a cloud-based marketing analytics company based in Westwood, alongside Wes Nichols. Jon served as its co-chief executive officer and managing partner until MarketShare was acquired in December, 2015 by Neustar for US$450 million in 2015. The acquisition was one of the largest amongst Los Angeles-founded companies.

Vein is also an Emmy Award-winning producer and winner of the 2016 Ernst & Young Entrepreneur of the Year Award. The Los Angeles Business Journal named Vein as one of the 500 Most Influential People in Los Angeles. Vein holds several patents including one for in-vitro meat.

=== Early career ===
Vein began his professional career working at technology companies, from Teledyne Relays to Hughes Aircraft, where he worked on the "Star Wars" program under President Ronald Reagan. He went on to co-found Dern & Vein, an entertainment law firm based in Los Angeles with Dixon Dern.

Vein left Dern & Vein to join Film Roman, an animation production company based in Los Angeles, where he held a number of positions, including Chief Operating Officer and interim chief executive officer. At Film Roman he produced King of the Hill and The Simpsons, winning an Emmy Award for the latter in 2001.

Vein subsequently served as the chief operating officer of Artist Management Group and the Artist Production Group, two companies based in Los Angeles and founded by Michael Ovitz. As COO, Vein oversaw all divisions, including talent, literary, animation, sports, music, publishing, and feature film production and helped negotiate Artist Management Group's acquisition by The Firm, Inc. in 2002.

=== Organizations ===
Vein is a member of the Los Angeles Chapter of the World Presidents Organization Gold. He was previously a member of the Golden West Chapter of the Young Presidents Organization, where he served as the chairman of that chapter. Jon is also a member of the California State Bar Association.

=== Political engagement ===
Vein served as a member of Barack Obama's National Finance Committees for both the 2008 and 2012 presidential campaigns, as well as on the National Finance Committee for Hillary Clinton's candidacy for president in 2016. He held several fundraisers for national, state, and local candidates. Vein served as a delegate to the Democratic National Convention in 2016, and is a member of the board of trustees for the Center of American Progress.

=== Public service ===
He has served as the president of the Los Angeles Convention and Tourism Development Board since 2013, and as the head of the Brand LA initiative for the Mayor's Fund in Los Angeles.

Vein is a member of the board of the California Cultural and Historic Endowment, the board of directors of the Los Angeles Philharmonic, the US Fund for UNICEF's Southern California Region (where he serves as co-president), and the University of Haifa.

He is a member of the board of the Los Angeles Police Foundation, the Los Angeles Business Council, and the advisory boards of the Los Angeles Sports & Entertainment Commission, and Step Up on Second.

== Personal life ==
Vein married Ellen Lee Goldsmith, co-founder of the Gotham Group, a talent agency and production company. They have a son, Jack, and a daughter, Caroline. They reside in Hancock Park, Los Angeles, California.
