= My Best Friend's Exorcism (film) =

2022 film by Damon Thomas

- Release poster
- Directed by: Damon Thomas
- Screenplay by: Jenna Lamia
- Based on: My Best Friend's Exorcism by Grady Hendrix
- Produced by: Ellen Goldsmith-Vein; David Borgenicht; Christopher Landon; Jennifer Semler
- Starring: Elsie Fisher; Amiah Miller; Rachel Ogechi Kanu; Cathy Ang; Clayton Royal Johnson; Nathan Anderson; Cynthia Evans; Christopher Lowell
- Cinematography: Rob C. Givens
- Edited by: Brad Turner
- Music by: Ryland Blackinton
- Production companies: Gotham Group; Endeavor Content; Quirk Books
- Distributed by: Amazon Prime Video
- Release date: September 30, 2022
- Running time: 97 minutes
- Country: United States
- Language: English

My Best Friend's Exorcism is a 2022 American supernatural comedy horror film directed by Damon Thomas from a screenplay by Jenna Lamia, based on the 2016 novel by Grady Hendrix. The film stars Elsie Fisher, Amiah Miller, Rachel Ogechi Kanu, and Cathy Ang. It was released on Amazon Prime Video on September 30, 2022.

== Plot ==
In 1988, high school sophomores Abby Rivers and Gretchen Lang are longtime best friends. Gretchen is moving away with her family over the summer, which saddens Abby, but Gretchen assures her they will always have each other. Together with their friends Margaret Chisholm and Glee Tanaka, Abby and Gretchen spend a weekend at Margaret's family's lake house. One night, they all ingest LSD provided by Margaret's boyfriend Wallace Stoney and, with the exception of Abby, go skinny-dipping in the lake. When Margaret makes an insensitive comment about Abby's acne, Abby walks away, with Gretchen following her to comfort her.

Abby and Gretchen venture into an abandoned shack across the lake where a ritualistic Satanic murder allegedly occurred. Inside, a sinister tree-like creature with a single giant eye scares both girls and they run. Abby successfully escapes while Gretchen is dragged away by an unseen force. Realizing Gretchen is not with her, Abby rushes back to the shack with Margaret and Glee to find Gretchen in a state of shock. Gretchen is upset that Abby abandoned her.

Back at school, Abby worries about Gretchen's uncharacteristically aloof demeanor, and her appearance gradually worsens. During a performance by the Lemon Brothers, a trio of Christian bodybuilders, one of the members, Christian, notices Gretchen's ghoulish appearance. Over the next few days, Gretchen continues to behave erratically, projectile vomiting during lunch and urinating in a trash can while in class.

Abby drives to Gretchen's house to check on her. Against her father's wishes, Gretchen leaves the house and jumps into Abby's car. As they drive, Gretchen reveals that ever since "he" (whose name she does not disclose) attacked her at the abandoned shack, "he" has been visiting and watching her every night. She swears Abby to secrecy about this. Abby, assuming that Gretchen was raped, tries to alert Gretchen's parents and the school headmistress but is rebuffed. When Abby suggests to Glee that Wallace raped Gretchen, Margaret accuses Abby of jealousy, and Gretchen scolds her for telling people about her situation. Abby is shunned by the other girls.

The school hosts a carnival, where Gretchen humiliates Abby by dunking her in a dunk tank and revealing that she fantasizes about one of their teachers. Abby storms off and Gretchen follows her, attempting to laugh it off, but Abby angrily ends their friendship. Gretchen is revealed to be possessed by a demon, who drives her to self-harm and, later that night, further torments her. The following day, however, Gretchen walks into class with her old beauty back and resumes taunting Abby.

Gretchen proceeds to terrorize Margaret and Glee by exploiting their insecurities. Knowing that Margaret is self-conscious about her weight, Gretchen gives her a diet shake that supposedly inhibits appetite. Margaret gradually becomes ill, and an enormous tapeworm eventually crawls out of her mouth. After manipulating closeted Glee into coming out as lesbian, Gretchen feeds her a nut-filled brownie, deliberately causing a severe allergic reaction. Margaret and Glee are both hospitalized.

Determined to save her friend, Abby turns to Christian, who confirms Gretchen is possessed and reluctantly agrees to help perform an exorcism. Abby and Christian kidnap Gretchen and tie her to a bed at Margaret's lake house. As Christian sprinkles salt and holy water on Gretchen, Abby says she learned that the demon's name is Andras. The process appears to work until Andras takes the form of Christian's deceased mother. Terrified, Christian abandons Abby halfway through the exorcism.

Gretchen escapes her bonds and attacks Abby, but Abby stabs Gretchen with a fire poker before Gretchen flees to the abandoned shack where she was possessed. Abby follows, reciting special moments they have shared in order to compel Andras. Gretchen finally vomits out Andras, who emerges as a small skeletal creature and attempts to repossess her. Using an old bottle of liquor and a lighter, Abby sets Andras on fire. Abby and Gretchen embrace.

As Gretchen and her family prepare to move, she and Abby say their goodbyes. While they are unsure if Andras is truly gone, they promise to stay in touch and reaffirm their sisterly love for one another.

== Cast ==
- Elsie Fisher as Abby Rivers
- Amiah Miller as Gretchen Lang
- Rachel Ogechi Kanu as Margaret Chisholm
- Cathy Ang as Glee Tanaka
- Clayton Royal Johnson as Wallace Stoney
- Christopher Lowell as Christian Lemon
- Nathan Anderson as Pony Lang
- Cynthia Evans as Grace Lang
- Rachel Leah Cohen as Mrs. Rivers
- John Stoneburner as Mr. Rivers
- Cameron Bass as Brother Morgan
- Ashley LeConte Campbell as Sister Kathleen
- Michael Wayne Foster as Micah Lemon
- Michael Proctor as Jonah Lemon
- Erin Ownbey as Lemon's mother

== Production ==
In November 2018, it was announced that Endeavor Content had acquired the film adaptation rights for Hendrix's book. Christopher Landon and Ellen Goldsmith-Vein were announced as producers. Damon Thomas was announced as director. In April 2021, Elsie Fisher, Amiah Miller, Rachel Ogechi Kanu, and Cathy Ang were cast of the film.

Principal photography began in early April 2021 in Georgia.

== Reception ==
On the review aggregator website Rotten Tomatoes, 49% of 51 critics' reviews are positive, with an average rating of 5.6/10.
