= The Final Girl Support Group =

2021 horror novel by Grady Hendrix

- First edition hardcover
- Author: Grady Hendrix
- Audio read by: Adrienne King
- Language: English
- Genre: Horror; Mystery
- Publisher: Berkley
- Publication date: 2021
- Publication place: United States
- Media type: Print (hardback), ebook, audiobook
- Pages: 352 pages
- ISBN: 9780593201237; First Edition Hardcover
- OCLC: 1202772135
- Dewey Decimal: 813/.6
- LC Class: PS3608.E543 F56 2021
- Preceded by: The Southern Book Club's Guide to Slaying Vampires
- Followed by: How to Sell a Haunted House

The Final Girl Support Group is a horror-themed mystery novel by American writer Grady Hendrix, published July 13, 2021 by Berkley Books. A television series adaptation has been announced.

Bloody Disgusting voiced their interest in the novel prior to its release, naming it one of "13 Horror Books We Can't Wait to Read in 2021".

== Synopsis ==
Lynnette Tarkington is one of several women who make up the "Final Girl Support Group," a group of women who are the sole survivors of horrific massacres. Adrienne was a camp counselor who survived a killer named Bruce who claimed that he was seeking revenge for a nonexistent son (a reference to Friday the 13th). Marilyn was attacked by bloodthirsty cannibals (a reference to The Texas Chain Saw Massacre). Dani's brother Nick escaped from a mental asylum and, on Halloween, slaughtered anyone who stood between him and his sister (a reference to Halloween). Julia was left a final girl after her boyfriend and one of his friends decided to turn her into a final girl (a reference to Scream), and Heather had to face a "Dream Killer" (a reference to A Nightmare on Elm Street). Lynnette herself had to deal with a situation dubbed the "Silent Night Slayings" by the media (a reference to Silent Night, Deadly Night). A seventh member, Chrissy (a reference to My Bloody Valentine), left the group in order to sell murder memorabilia. Their experiences left a lasting impact on their lives that has endured into their later adulthood.

Lynette is barely hanging on, only leaving her secured apartment to attend the support group. During one of the gatherings the women learn that Adrienne was killed. They all return to their respective homes; however, Julia follows Lynette home and tricks her into allowing her into the apartment along with a reporter, Russell. The trio are attacked and Lynette flees the home and calls her therapist, Dr. Carol, who takes her into her home. The following day Lynette returns to her apartment to retrieve a copy of a tell-all book Russell had attempted to blackmail her into writing. She then reunites with Marilyn and Heather, learning that Dani had been arrested by the police when they tried to question her about her reopened case. They decide to try and check in on Dani's wife, who is in hospice, but the outing results in the woman's death and Lynette's arrest. Once in jail, the police accuse her of sleeping with the Silent Night Slayings killer, Ricky, using forged letters as evidence. She is attacked in prison by a guard and saved by her former lover Garrett, who reveals that he knew she was going to be attacked and allowed it to take place to prove to the LAPD that she wasn't safe. While taking her back to face hometown justice, he lets her go, telling her he agrees someone is pulling the strings. As he tries to concoct a narrative painting himself as a hero in her escape, Lynette attacks him, steals his car, and flees.

She decides to kidnap a girl she learned about from Dr. Carol's office, Stephanie, who had survived her tennis coach's attempt to kill all of his players. The two decide to investigate leads on their own, including a suspicion that Chrissy may have knowledge of the killer. Chrissy's boyfriend attacks the group and Chrissy dies in the resulting chaos, but not before she voices suspicion that Dr. Carol may be related to the murders. Lynette and Stephanie reconnect with Dani, who tells them that everyone is gathering at Camp Red Lake, the site of Adrienne's slayings. On the way there Lynette and Dani are attacked by Stephanie, revealing that she was one of the killers behind the recent events. Lynette manages to survive by pretending to be dead and makes her way to the camp, where she learns that Dr. Carol's son Skye was also behind the murders. The support group manages to overcome their attackers just in time for the police to arrive and arrest Skye and Stephanie.

In the aftermath of the events, Lynette comes to live with Dani on her ranch while the other women try to heal in their own ways. Lynette comes to realize that Stephanie was groomed by Skye into committing the murders and that while Stephanie was an aggressor, she is still a victim of a monster. The book ends with Lynette visiting Stephanie in prison and welcoming her to the Final Girls Support Group.

== Development ==
While writing the book, Hendrix chose not to read other books centered on final girls, as he did not want to be influenced. He completed a first draft of the novel in 2014, but was unable to sell the manuscript due to Riley Sager announcing that he would be penning the novel Final Girls. Hendrix has stated that he was glad the novel did not sell, as he later rewrote the second half of the novel as "I was sticking the landing, but I was sticking a C-minus landing." In an interview, he also stated that he wrote The Final Girl Support Group as a standalone novel, with no intent for a sequel.

== Release ==
The Final Girl Support Group was released in hardback and ebook formats on July 13, 2021, through Berkley. An audiobook adaptation narrated by Friday the 13th actress Adrienne King was simultaneously released via W.F. Howes, an RBmedia company and Penguin Random House Audio.

== Reception ==
Critical reception has been positive. USA Today gave the novel 3/4 stars, writing that "It's a thin and bloody line that separates horror fun from the truly horrific, and Grady has a lot of fun walking it as he writes his final girls a triumphant conclusion rarely afforded survivors in real life." The AV Club praised the novel's tension, as they felt that the "wicked pleasure of Hendrix's book comes from just how effectively he sets up the life-or-death stakes of Lynnette's situation—and how clearly outmatched her and the other women seem to be."

Awards for The Final Girl Support Group
Year	Award	Category	Result	Cite
2021	Goodreads Choice Award	Horror	Won	
2021	Bram Stoker Award	Novel	Nominated	

== Adaptation ==
Adaptation rights were optioned prior to the book's release date by Annapurna Pictures, with the intention to turn the novel into a television series. Per Deadline, Elizabeth Craft and Sarah Fain will serve as screenwriters while Grady Hendrix will executive produce with Megan Ellison, Sue Naegle, Patrick Chu, and Adam Goldworm. The series landed at HBO Max, with Charlize Theron joining as executive producer, alongside Barbara and Andy Muschietti, the latter planning to direct the pilot.

In July 2026, Paramount Pictures acquired the rights to adapt the book into film, with Christopher Landon directing and writing.
