= Rice bowl (food) =

Dish consisting of rice served with toppings

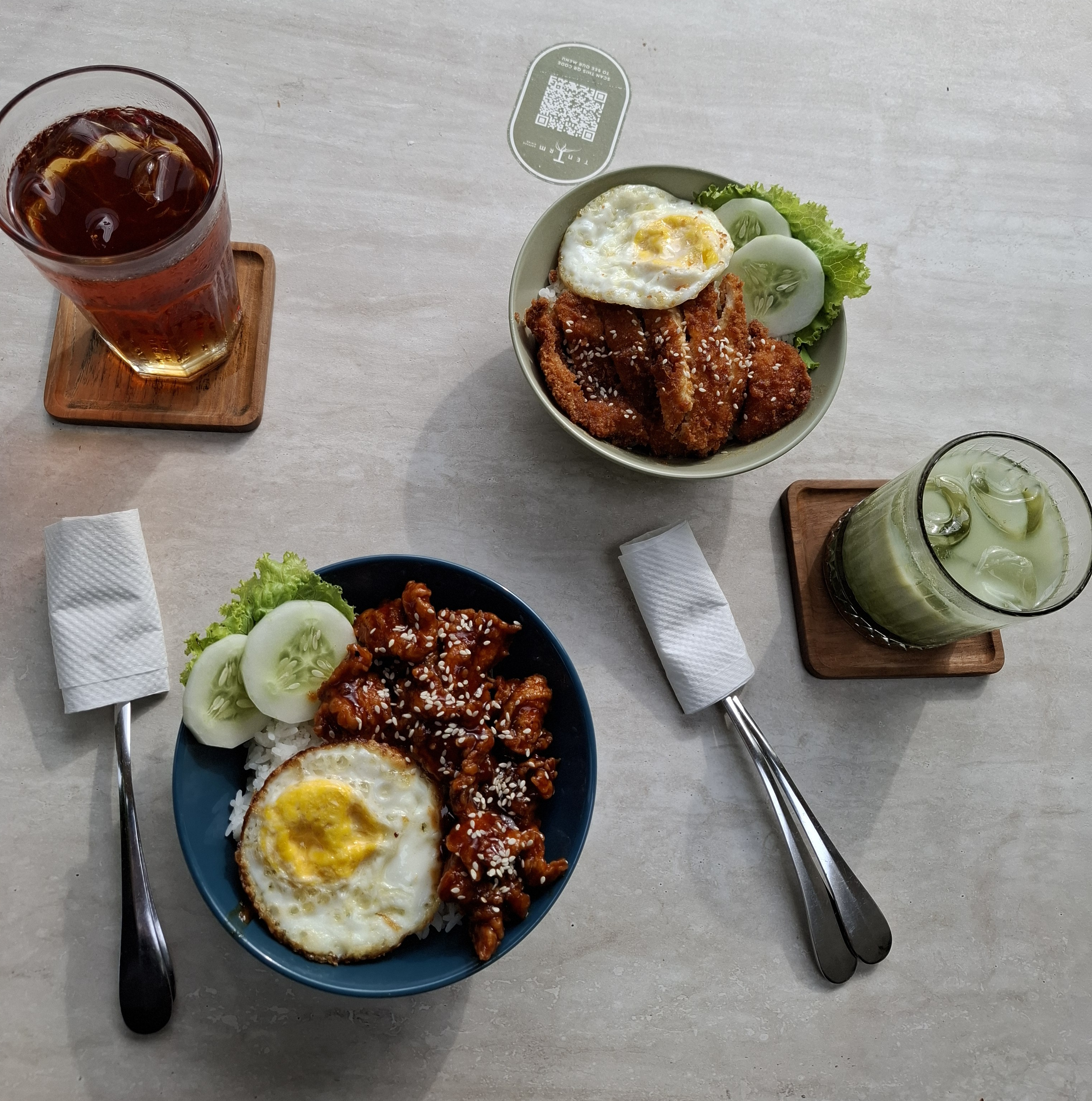
- Rice bowls with assorted toppings
- Course: Main course
- Region or state: Worldwide
- Main ingredients: Rice, assorted toppings
- Variations: donburi, poke bowls, burrito bowls, bibimbap, gàifàn

A rice bowl is a dish with rice as its base that is topped with a variety of ingredients. To serve a rice bowl, unseasoned or lightly seasoned cooked rice are placed in a bowl and then toppings are placed on or alongside the rice. Rice bowls are commonly associated with East Asian cuisines with regional variations including Japanese donburi, Korean bibimbap, and Chinese gaifan.

In the 21st century, rice bowls are also commonly found in some fast casual restaurants in western countries, including variations such as poke bowls, burrito bowls, and plant-based Buddha bowls.

== Variations ==
Variations of rice bowl dishes are common in East Asian cuisine. Various forms of Banfan (拌饭) and Gaifan (盖饭) are Chinese rice bowl dishes consisting of cooked rice served with toppings such as meat, fish, vegetables, or tofu dishes. Donburi is a Japanese dish consisting of a bowl of rice topped with various ingredients such as thinly sliced beef in Gyūdon. Bibimbap is a Korean dish consisting of rice initially topped with meat, egg, spicy gochujang sauce and assorted vegetables that includes spinach and carrots.

Rice bowl dishes also exist in other cuisines. Poke bowls are Hawaiian rice bowls consisting of diced raw fish served over rice with vegetables and sauces. Burrito bowls contain ingredients commonly used in burritos, such as beans, meat, vegetables, salsa, and avocado, served over rice instead of wrapped in a tortilla. A Buddha Bowl is a plant-based bowl meal that typically consists of rice or other grains as a base, topped or placed alongside legumes, tofu, and vegetables.

== See also ==
- Fried rice
- Iron rice bowl
