= Happy End (2003 film) =

2003 film by Amos Kollek

- Theatrical release poster
- Directed by: Amos Kollek
- Written by: Amos Kollek
- Produced by: Alain Sarde; Frédéric Robbes
- Starring: Audrey Tautou; Justin Theroux; Laila Robins; Catherine Curtin; Frank Pellegrino; Jenna Lamia; Juan Carlos Hernández; Jennifer Tilly
- Cinematography: Ken Kelsch
- Edited by: Jeffrey Marc Harkavy; Luc Barnier
- Music by: Chico Freeman
- Production companies: Les Films Alain Sarde; FRP; Pandora Film
- Distributed by: Mars Distribution (France)
- Release date: 24 December 2003 (France)
- Running time: 88 minutes
- Countries: France; United States; Germany
- Language: English

Happy End, also known as Nowhere to Go but Up, is a 2003 romantic comedy-drama film written and directed by Amos Kollek. It stars Audrey Tautou and Justin Theroux, with Laila Robins, Catherine Curtin, Frank Pellegrino, Jenna Lamia, Juan Carlos Hernández and Jennifer Tilly in supporting roles, and Jim Parsons in his film debut. An international co-production of France, the United States and Germany, the film follows a young French woman who has come to New York City to try her luck as an actress, crossing paths with a screenwriter suffering from writer's block along the way.

== Plot ==
Val Chipzik, a 23-year-old French woman, has come to New York City with dreams of becoming an actress. Between auditions, she takes odd jobs to make ends meet, including cleaning toilets, sweeping sidewalks and frying spring rolls. Val invests the little money she earns in further training for her dream career, taking acting and fencing lessons. Since she is homeless, she often sleeps in the foliage outside the Greenwich Village townhouse of Jack Gardner, a screenwriter who has been suffering from writer's block for five years. Jack is initially annoyed by Val, who changes her clothes and performs loud vocal exercises in his front yard. One day, Val befriends a street prostitute named Sparkle.

Jack still pines for his ex-wife, Beatrix Shultz. Val takes a job as a cleaning woman at Beatrix's Tribeca apartment, which used to belong to Jack. When Val suddenly faints on Jack's stoop one day, he takes her inside. Jack asks Val why she works so hard on becoming an actress, and she responds that she has promised her illiterate mother, who has never left their village in France, that she would become a star. Beatrix fires Val when she tries to receive a guest of Beatrix's, and after discovering that Val faked her letters of recommendation. Jack, who has fallen in love with Val, tells her that he has been writing a screenplay based on her, but she rebuffs him.

Val moves in temporarily with Edna, a lesbian waitress and poetess that she met while eating at a restaurant. Three weeks later, Val feels that she has not gotten anywhere and moves out of Edna's apartment. Meanwhile, Jack completes his screenplay and shows it to his agent Irene, who finds it brilliant. Val stages an independent production of Cinderella along with Sparkle and another prostitute, with Jack in the audience. Beatrix rehires Val as her cleaning woman and shows her a glowing review that Jack wrote of her performance as Cinderella for a local newspaper. Later, Beatrix visits Jack and they try to have sex, though he struggles with impotence. Jack rejects Beatrix's attempt at reconciliation.

A major film production company offers Jack a million-dollar advance for the rights to his screenplay. Irene tries to persuade Jack to sign the contract, but he insists on casting Val as the lead actress. Irene takes Val on as a client after they meet by chance one night, with Edna as Val's manager. Val achieves Hollywood stardom and eventually wins an Academy Award. One day, Val visits Jack and thanks him for everything he has done for her. She then points out that he never told her that he loves her, and he replies that it is not an easy thing to say, before she leaves. That night, Jack overhears Val talking to her mother over the phone on his stoop. Jack joins Val in his front yard, where they lie down together and kiss.

Some time later, Jack attends a stage musical starring Val, Edna, Beatrix and Sparkle.

== Cast ==
- Audrey Tautou as Val Chipzik
- Justin Theroux as Jack
- Jennifer Tilly as Edna
- Laila Robins as Irene
- Catherine Curtin as Beatrix
- Frank Pellegrino as Bernie
- Jenna Lamia as Sparkle
- Juan Carlos Hernández as Eddie
- Bruce MacVittie as Benito
- Joe Zaloom as Karim
- Daniel Oreskes as second casting director
- Jeffrey Carlson as Luke
- Jim Parsons as casting assistant

== Critical reception ==
Lisa Nesselson of Variety wrote that the film "lands with a thud" and added, "Despite an energetic central perf by versatile Audrey Tautou, mix of whimsy and vulgarity in the industrious, yet generic, screenplay never coalesces."
