= Satanic Panic (film) =

2019 comedy horror film

- Theatrical release poster
- Directed by: Chelsea Stardust
- Screenplay by: Grady Hendrix
- Story by: Grady Hendrix; Ted Geoghegan
- Produced by: Dallas Sonnier; Amanda Presmyk
- Starring: Hayley Griffith; Ruby Modine; Arden Myrin; A. J. Bowen; Jordan Ladd; Jeff Daniel Phillips; Michael Polish; Hannah Stocking; Whitney Moore; Skeeta Jenkins; Mike E. Winfield; Jerry O'Connell; Rebecca Romijn
- Cinematography: Mark Evans
- Edited by: Michael Sale
- Music by: Wolfmen of Mars
- Production company: Fangoria
- Distributed by: RLJE Films
- Release dates: May 31, 2019 (Overlook Film Festival); September 6, 2019 (United States)
- Running time: 80 minutes
- Country: United States
- Language: English

Satanic Panic is a 2019 American comedy horror film directed by Chelsea Stardust, based on a screenplay written by novelist Grady Hendrix and adapted from a story created by Hendrix and Ted Geoghegan. It is a Fangoria production.

In the film, a virgin girl working for a pizza delivery service is captured by a cult. They want to use her womb to summon Baphomet, but would-be-rapists have their own agenda about the girl.

The film had its world premiere at the Overlook Film Festival on May 31, 2019. It was released in the United States to limited theaters and VOD platforms on September 6, 2019, by RLJE Films. It received mixed reviews from critics.

== Plot ==
Samantha "Sam" Craft's first day as a pizza delivery girl is going poorly, as customers aren't giving her tips. When she is assigned a delivery in the affluent Mill Basin neighborhood, she is hopeful that her luck will change. However, the delivery recipient, Gary Neumieir, also stiffs Sam on a tip. Frustrated and needing gas money, Sam enters the mansion to demand a tip. Inside, she inadvertently interrupts the secret gathering of a satanic coven led by Danica Ross. The coven, which includes Gary Neumieir and his wife Gypsy, capture Sam after they realize she is a virgin.

Sam awakens to find herself held captive with Danica's disgruntled husband, Samuel. Samuel explains that the coven plans to summon the demon Baphomet but needs a virgin's womb to do so. After Sam reveals that she is a virgin, Samuel says that he can save their lives by taking her virginity and tries to sexually assault her. Sam fights back. Samuel pulls a gun but accidentally fatally shoots himself as Sam escapes outside.

Sam flees down the street to another mansion, where her pleas for help are answered by a babysitter, Kristen. However, Sam soon discovers that the babysitter is in league with the coven. Fleeing upstairs, Sam encounters Kristen's sister Michelle, who attacks Sam with a strap-on dildo drill. Sam avoids the attack and Michelle accidentally impales her sister, before electrocuting herself when the drill punctures wiring in a wall.

Sam hears cries for help from a bedroom, and she enters to find Judi Ross, the daughter of coven leader Danica, hogtied on the bed. Danica had originally intended Judi to be the coven's virginal sacrifice, but after discovering that Judi had had sex to avoid this fate, Danica ordered Judi to be killed. Sam frees Judi and calls 911, but the call redirects to the coven, so the girls again flee.

Danica next tries to capture Sam by creating a "haxan cloak" creature from her dead husband's heart, but Sam escapes the creature with Judi's help. Gypsy questions Danica's leadership, and when the rest of the coven sides with Gypsy, Danica agrees to let Gypsy conduct a ritual to curse and kill Judi from afar. However, Judi, who is versed in witchcraft, manages with Sam's help to ward off the curse. An irate Gypsy confronts Danica about teaching her daughter the protection magic that allowed her to survive. Another coven member suddenly plunges a spike into Danica's head, apparently killing her. However, after the coven leaves in search of Sam, Danica resurrects herself. Using knowledge gained from reading the entrails of a man she murders, Danica tracks down and captures Sam and Judi.

Sam and Judi awaken tied to an altar in Danica's backyard, surrounded by the coven. Danica, triumphant and back in control of the coven, uses a spell to drown Gypsy. As she falls dead, Gypsy inadvertently breaks the protective circle of salt laid to prevent the ritual from being disturbed. The summoning begins, and Sam is supernaturally impregnated by Baphomet. An enraged Sam breaks free from her bonds and holds a knife to her now-pregnant belly, demanding Judi be released. Instead, Danica slashes Judi's throat and kills her.

Despondent, Sam suddenly goes into labor; to calm herself she repeats a "two fuzzy bunnies" mantra, and then she gives birth to two fuzzy bunnies (rather than Baphomet as intended) to the shock of the coven. Sam suddenly finds the yard empty of all coven members. A demon named Samaziel manifests in front of Sam in the guise of a little girl. Samaziel explains that it ranks higher than Baphomet among hell's demons and is angry that the coven did not worship it. Because the protective line of salt had been disturbed by Gypsy's death, Samaziel was able to enter and wreak havoc on the ritual. Sam convinces Samaziel to spare her, and as Sam flees, the yard is again populated with the coven. Danica is decapitated as Samaziel laughs. Coven members begin choking to death. Sam collects one of the bunnies (the other having been killed) and escapes on her Vespa as Samaziel waves goodbye.

Sam returns to the pizzeria, where she tells her boss she is going to Australia and leaves with her bunny, now named Judi Junior.

== Cast ==
- Hayley Griffith as Samantha 'Sam' Craft
- Rebecca Romijn as Danica Ross
- Jerry O'Connell as Samuel Ross
- Ruby Modine as Judi Ross
- Jordan Ladd as Kim Larson
- Arden Myrin as Gypsy Neumieir
- Whitney Moore as Michelle Larson
- Jeff Daniel Phillips as Steve Larson
- Michael Polish as Gary Neumieir
- Hannah Stocking as Kristen Larson
- A. J. Bowen as Duncan Havermyer
- Skeeta Jenkins as Mr. Styles

== Development ==
Satanic Panic was first announced in Variety in 2015, with Ted Geoghegan attached to direct. The original script was penned by Grady Hendrix, based on a story by Hendrix and Geoghegan. When pre-production halted, the two would go on to work together on the 2017 film Mohawk, which Geoghegan would direct.

Renewed plans to create the film were announced in June 2018, with Chelsea Stardust selected to direct; Dallas Sonnier, Adam Goldworm, and Amanda Presmyk slated to produce; and Fangoria editor-in-chief Phil Nobile Jr. to serve as executive producer.

In October 2018, actress Rebecca Romijn was chosen to headline the film as the leader of the Satanic cult, with Hayley Griffith set to co-star as the pizza girl turned unwilling sacrifice. Other cast members, including Jerry O'Connell, Ruby Modine, and Jordan Ladd, were also announced.

Filming began later that same month in Dallas, Texas, and was completed in November of the same year.

== Reception ==
Satanic Panic has an approval rating of 63% on Rotten Tomatoes based on 62 reviews, with an average rating of 6.2/10. The site's critical consensus states: "It isn't terribly devilish or particularly pulse-quickening, but Satanic Panic remains an entertaining midnight movie that forgiving genre enthusiasts will enjoy." On Metacritic, the film has a weighted average score 51 out of 100 based on 7 critics, indicating "mixed or average reviews".

== Home media ==
The film was released on DVD and Blu-ray on October 22, 2019. That month, it was reported that Blu-ray copies of the film sold at Walmart had the word Satanic removed from the film's title on their slipcover packaging.
