= The Southern Book Club's Guide to Slaying Vampires =

Novel by Grady Hendrix

- Author: Grady Hendrix
- Audio read by: Bahni Turpin
- Language: English
- Genre: Horror, vampire literature
- Publisher: Quirk Books
- Publication date: April 7, 2020
- Publication place: United States
- Media type: Print, ebook, audiobook
- Pages: 408 pp
- ISBN: 9781683691433 (hardcover 1st edition)
- Preceded by: We Sold Our Souls
- Followed by: The Final Girl Support Group

The Southern Book Club's Guide to Slaying Vampires is a 2020 horror novel by American author Grady Hendrix. It was first published on April 7, 2020, through Quirk Books and centers upon a women's book club that faces a vampiric threat.

== Synopsis ==
Patricia Campbell, a 1990s Southern suburban housewife, has few activities in her life that bring her satisfaction. Her days are spent caring for her mother-in-law, Miss Mary, who has dementia, while her husband, Carter, works frequently as a doctor, and her two older children focus on their own interests.

Patricia's sole escape is her book club, which has recently splintered into a new group that focuses on true crime. The group includes Grace, Kitty Scruggs, Slick Paley, and Maryellen. The book club is a chance for these women to escape their domesticity and talk about things other than their husbands and children. However, everything changes when Patricia is attacked by an elderly neighbor named Ann Savage. Following the attack, Patricia meets Ann's nephew, James Harris. James seems dashing and is good at investments, but he harbors a little secret. He's a vampire.

Patricia's suspicions about James are confirmed by Ursula Greene, a woman who had previously worked for the Campbell family. Mrs. Greene tells Patricia that James's white van was seen in her neighborhood, and ever since, black children in the area have gone missing or are killing themselves in horrific ways. It starts with 8-year-old Orville Reed and his cousin, Sam. Mrs. Greene is fearful that the disappearances will continue. When 9-year-old Destiny Taylor starts showing odd behavior, Patricia wants to get involved and try to stop James before it's too late.

The police refuse to take the disappearances seriously, and even worse, Patricia's book club doesn't believe her at first. As strange disturbances continue, the book club eventually has no choice but to get involved. As a result, they discover not only supernatural evil but also systematic racism and "misogyny, rage, anger, and the indignities that women had to endure in order to survive, to be respectable, to be considered proper women."

== Development ==
When developing the book Hendrix chose to set it in his childhood home town of Charleston and drew upon some of his personal experiences. His own grandmother had dementia, which frightened Hendrix as a child, as he remembered her "as a monster, and that's not her fault, it was a disease none of us understood." He thus created the character of Mrs. Mary, Patricia's mother-in-law, to "give her the hero moment she deserved, the one Alzheimer's robbed her of at the end of her life." Hendrix also chose to explore the relationships between white and black women in the South during the 1990s, as the lives of the two groups were interconnected. He had the vampire prey upon black children and adults as the vampire "assumes that the children of working class African American parents aren't valued. He doesn't look deeper and realize that in a lot of ways, at our best, moms care about kids no matter whose they are."

== Publication history ==
The Southern Book Club's Guide to Slaying Vampires was first published in hardcover and ebook format on April 7, 2020, through Quirk Books. It was accompanied by an audiobook adaptation narrated by Bahni Turpin and published by Blackstone Publishing.

== Reception ==
Tor.com stated that The Southern Book Club's Guide to Slaying Vampires was "a brutal book", whose "happy ending comes at a high cost." The AV Club's AUX also reviewed the work, comparing it to "its undead antagonist: flashy and engaging in the action, but strangely hollow at its heart." In a starred review, Kirkus Reviews described how, "Hendrix cleverly sprinkles in nods to well-established vampire lore, and the fact that he's a master at conjuring heady 1990s nostalgia is just the icing on what is his best book yet. Fans of smart horror will sink their teeth into this one."

== Television series ==
Television rights to The Southern Book Club's Guide to Slaying Vampires were optioned prior to the book's publication by Patrick Moran's PMK Productions, and development had already begun; however, in July 2024 Deadline reported that Warner Bros Discovery bought the rights, and that it will be put on their streaming service, Max. The author, Grady Hendrix, will be an executive Producer and writer on the show, as will Danny McBride and Edi Patterson (known for The Righteous Gemstones)
