= How to Sell a Haunted House =

2023 horror novel by Grady Hendrix

- Author: Grady Hendrix
- Audio read by: Jay Aaseng; Mikhaila Aaseng
- Language: English
- Genre: Horror
- Published: 2023
- Publication place: United States
- Media type: Print, ebook, audiobook
- ISBN: 0593201264 First edition US hardback
- Preceded by: The Final Girl Support Group

How to Sell a Haunted House is a 2023 horror novel by American author Grady Hendrix. The book was first published on January 17, 2023.

== Synopsis ==
Louise Joyner is a single mother living with her daughter, Poppy, in California. Her estranged brother, Mark, calls one evening to tell her that their parents died suddenly in a car accident. Louise travels to South Carolina to deal with the arrangements and immediately comes into conflict with Mark over his decision to cremate their parents and scatter the ashes in the ocean instead of having a traditional funeral service, and his choice to have the house cleaned out of their parents' possessions immediately.

The siblings' extended family, including their great aunt Honey, her daughter Gail, and Gail's daughters Mercy and Constance, intervene and persuade Mark to agree to a funeral service and burial. After the service, it's revealed that Louise and Mark's mother, Nancy, died after their father and has left her entire estate, including the house, to Mark. Nancy, who spent her life making puppets and performing in puppet shows, leaves all of her artwork to Louise, who had always looked down on her mother's work and even resented it.

The fallout from the funeral intensifies the conflict between Mark and Louise, rooted in resentments related to Louise mocking their mother's puppetry and abandonment of the family, and Mark's frequent reliance on their parents financially after dropping out of college and several failed business ventures. Louise purposefully delays Mark from selling the house, which is highly valuable, by pretending to meticulously catalogue her mother's puppets and artwork. While taking a nap, Louise is attacked by dead squirrels from a nativity scene her mother had made. She fights them off, but convinces herself it was a hallucination.

Mercy, a real estate agent, refuses to sell the house because it's haunted. While Mark is convinced their parents are haunting the house, Louise is not but is determined to get the house sold and goes along with a plan to have a final family dinner in the house to allow their parents' spirits to move on. Mark and Louise end up arguing over dinner. He accuses her of attempting to kill her when they were children, and Louise recalls that her mother's favorite puppet, a clown called Pupkin, was her constant companion when she was five years old, often encouraging her to harm the toddler Mark in minor ways. Eventually, Pupkin convinced Louise to trick Mark into walking on thin ice on a frozen pond, and he nearly drowned. Afterward, Louise buried Pupkin but later found him restored in her mother's bedroom.

Mark warns his sister not to sleep in the house, but she ignores him. Louise wakes to find Pupkin attacking her. Mark returns and shoots the puppet, saving her, and they leave together. Mark tells Louise that he dropped out of college after a disturbing experience with a group of politically active puppeteers. Nancy mailed him Pupkin at his request to use in a show. One of Mark's fellow puppeteers became obsessed with Pupkin, refusing to take him off, and persuaded Mark and the others to make Pupkin masks that they increasingly wore for hours a day, slowly losing touch with reality. Mark found himself living more and more in "Tickytoo Woods," the world Nancy created for Pupkin, and had few memories of what he was doing when he wore the mask. Eventually he burned down the house where the puppet collective lived, but found that Pupkin had survived and returned him to Nancy.

Mark and Louise resolve to destroy Pupkin and return to the house, but are attacked by Mark's childhood imaginary dog, Spider. Pupkin demands Mark put him on to stop the dog from killing Louise, and he complies, but then Mark attacks his sister while under the puppet's control. Mark briefly regains himself enough to ask Louise to cut off his arm to save them both from Pupkin. She complies, and rushes him to the hospital, but the doctors are unable to reattach his arm. Louise returns to the house and burns Pupkin on a grill, despite hearing his desperate pleas in her head.

Louise returns to California to find Poppy wearing Pupkin. Poppy's father Ian claims Poppy made the puppet with his mother. Louise attempts to separate Poppy and Pupkin, but is unsuccessful and returns with them to South Carolina. Poppy becomes visibly ill and drained the longer she wears the puppet. Aunt Gail and her friend Barb attempt to perform an exorcism, convinced Pupkin is the vessel for a demon, but discover he is actually a representation of Nancy's deceased brother, Freddie, who died at age 5. Pupkin was one of the few things Freddie's grief-stricken parents did not destroy, and Nancy kept him for the rest of her life.

Louise and Mark go to see Honey, who reluctantly tells them that Freddie drowned when Nancy neglected to watch him, and that the family lied about burying him in a cemetery and actually buried him in their backyard. The siblings take Poppy and Pupkin to the house to find Freddie's remains, but Pupkin takes control of the rest of Nancy's puppets and forces them to attack Louise and Mark. Louise calls on Spider to help her dig up Freddie's grave, and gently tells Pupkin that he must move on. She has a vision of Freddie departing peacefully to rejoin his sister and parents.

Several months later, Louise and Poppy return to South Carolina to attend the reburial for Freddie. Mark has renovated the family home and plans to work with Mercy to flip other properties. Louise and Mark come to the house together to say goodbye, and suddenly smell the scent of their father's cooking, believing it to be a final message of love from him. Louise returns home, and maintains a close relationship with her brother.

== Development ==
Hendrix began writing the novel during the COVID-19 pandemic, stating, "whether it's around a campfire, at a sleepover, or alone by ourselves on the couch, there's nothing more comforting than a haunted house story." He chose to center the story around family due to the impact family has on everyone's lives. Hendrix set the story in his hometown, which he had used for his novels My Best Friend's Exorcism and The Southern Book Club's Guide to Slaying Vampires, noting that this would be the last novel to use this setting.

== Release ==
How to Sell a Haunted House was published in hardback and ebook formats on January 17, 2023, through Berkley Books. An audiobook adaptation narrated by Jay and Mikhaila Aaseng was released simultaneously through Penguin Audio.

== Reception ==
In a review for The New York Times, Danielle Trussoni states that "by weaving violence, family trauma and humor, Hendrix creates a texture that engages the reader emotionally and viscerally." Lee Mandelo of Tor.com noted that, "The novel reminded me of the frenetic, compulsive energy that propelled me through pulp horror paperbacks as a kid, except cleverly updated for a contemporary adult audience." Writing for NPR, Gabino Iglesias called it "campy, unexpectedly deep — and as creepy as the dead eyes of a puppet at midnight in a gloomy room — How to Sell a Haunted House is a tense, dark novel."

== Adaptation ==
In 2023, Legendary Entertainment won the rights to a film adaptation directed by James Ashcroft and adapted by Hendrix.
