= Sheri Foster =

American actress

- Occupation: Actor
- Years active: 1980–present
- Spouse: John Blake

Sheri Foster is an American actress and registered member of the Cherokee nation from Texas. Her theatre experiences include The Independence of Eddie Rose, Death of a Miner, God of Vengeance, and touring with the Native American Theater group Mystic Voices. Her film work includes U-Turn (for which she was honored with a Best Supporting Actress Award from First Americans in the Arts), Naturally Native, Secondhand Heart, and Shouting Secrets. TV credits include House, Crazy Horse, Coyote Waits, and Unbreakable Kimmy Schmidt.

== Personal life ==
Born in Texas in 1951, Foster is a citizen of the Cherokee Nation.

== Filmography ==
Year	Film	Role	Notes
1997	U-Turn	Grace's Mother	
1998	Yellow Wooden Ring (Short)	Aunt Eunice	
2002	Strong Medicine	Mary Muskegon	episode: Precautions
2003	Coyote Waits	Blue Lady	
2009	House	Cashier	episode: The Social Contract
2017	Mohawk	Wentahawi	
2015–2017	Unbreakable Kimmy Schmidt	Fern White	7 episodes
2023	Spirit Rangers	Tuk'e'm / Grandma Rattlesnake / Cat Rescue Volunteer	Voice; 3 episodes
2024	Strange Darling	The Driver	
