= Paperbacks from Hell =

2017 non-fiction work by Grady Hendrix

Paperbacks from Hell: The Twisted History of ‘70s and ‘80s Horror Fiction
- Author: Grady Hendrix
- Audio read by: Timothy Andrés Pabon
- Language: English
- Subject: Paperback horror fiction
- Genre: Non-fiction
- Publisher: Quirk Books, Blackstone Audio
- Publication place: United States
- English publication date: September 19, 2017
- Media type: Print (paperback), ebook, audiobook
- Pages: 256 pages
- Awards: Bram Stoker Award for Best Non-Fiction
- ISBN: 1594749817
- Preceded by: My Best Friend's Exorcism
- Followed by: We Sold Our Souls

Paperbacks from Hell: The Twisted History of ‘70s and ‘80s Horror Fiction is a 2017 non-fiction book by American writer Grady Hendrix. It was first published by Quirk Books on September 19, 2017 in print and ebook. An audiobook release by Blackstone Audio followed on January 9, 2018.

In March 2018 Paperbacks from Hell won the Bram Stoker Award for Best Non-Fiction. Valancourt Books later announced that they would re-publish select horror novels as part of a limited series, chosen by Hendrix and Will Errickson.

== Synopsis ==
Paperbacks from Hell examines paperback horror novels of the 70s and 80s. Hendrix pays attention to trends and events that increased horror's readership and popularity and how the 1988 release of The Silence of the Lambs prompted publishers to shift their focus from horror to thrillers and techno-thrillers. He also cites a glut of product paired with less quality control and an increase in misogynistic content as contributing to this decrease in popularity, noting that it was a variety of factors that led to this.

The book also examines authors such as V. C. Andrews and R. L. Stine, as well as cover artwork, which he states publishers knew would be vital to appealing to readers. Also covered are various sub-genres of the horror genre, such as Native American curses or pregnancy sub-genres.

== Development ==
Hendrix came up with the idea of writing a book on paperback horror novels from the 70s and 80s while purchasing a copy of The Little People by John Christopher, which he describes as "a book about a castle in Ireland being turned into a B&B, and the big problem is Nazi leprechauns in the basement". He read an average of four books a day for a three-month period and focused his efforts by reading books from the same sub-genre at a time, as this helped him recognize literary tropes and benchmarks specific to those novels.

== Reception ==
Critical reception for Paperbacks from Hell has been positive, with Locus praising the book for its use of cover art images to back up Hendrix's historical assessment of horror fiction. The AV Club and New York Times also praised the work, with the latter additionally citing the presence of "potted histories of authors for whom full histories are likely not forthcoming" as a highlight. Tor.com wrote a favorable review, stating "It's a gorgeous, lurid deep-dive into horror's heyday and a must-read for any self-respecting horror fan." Writing for the Washington Post, Ernest Hilbert wrote that the book is "as funny as it is engaging, assuring us that whatever else may be said of these paperbacks, most long since disappeared into landfills and yard sale boxes, "they will not bore you.""
