= New Republic Pictures =

American film production company

New Republic Pictures, LLC
- Type: Private
- Industry: Film
- Founded: 2017; 9 years ago
- Founder: Brian Oliver
- Headquarters: 709 N. Gardner Street, Los Angeles, California, U.S., U.S.
- Products: Motion pictures
- Owner: Ron Burkle
- Subsidiaries: Providence Film Group
- Website: www.newrepublicpictures.com

New Republic Pictures, LLC is an American production company and independent financier of feature films founded by Brian Oliver in 2017. The first film co-financed and produced by the company was Rocketman (2019), followed by 1917 (2019).

== History ==
In May 2018, New Republic struck a multi-year, first-look co-financing and distribution deal with Paramount Pictures, which kicked off with Rocketman. In December 2019, Bradley J. Fischer was tapped as president and Chief Content Officer of the company.

In June 2020, Cate Blanchett and her Dirty Films banner signed a first-look deal with New Republic. This was followed up by a first-look deal with Jake Gyllenhaal and his banner Nine Stories Productions.

In August 2020, New Republic signed a co-financing deal for 10 films with Paramount Pictures.

== Films ==
This is the list of films produced or financed by New Republic.

Year	Film	Director	Distributor	Notes	Budget	Gross	RT
2019	Rocketman	Dexter Fletcher	Paramount Pictures	co-production with Rocket Pictures and Marv Films	$40 million	$195.2 million	89%
2019	1917	Sam Mendes	Universal Pictures	co-production with Amblin Partners, DreamWorks Pictures, Reliance Entertainment, Mogambo and Neal Street Productions	$90–100 million	$368.7 million	89%
2021	Coming 2 America	Craig Brewer	Amazon Studios	co-production with Paramount Pictures, Eddie Murphy Productions and Misher Films	N/A		49%
2021	Without Remorse	Stefano Sollima	Amazon Studios	co-production with Skydance Media, Paramount Pictures, Weed Road Pictures, Outlier Society and Midnight Radio Productions	N/A		45%
2021	Infinite	Antoine Fuqua	Paramount+	co-production with Di Bonaventura Pictures, Closest to the Hole Productions, Leverage Entertainment and Fuqua Films	N/A		16%
2021	The Tomorrow War	Chris McKay	Amazon Studios	co-production with Skydance Media and Paramount Pictures	$200 million	$19.2 million	54%
2021	Clifford the Big Red Dog	Walt Becker	Paramount Pictures	co-production with Entertainment One, The Kerner Entertainment Company and Scholastic Entertainment	$64 million	$44 million	52%
2022	Ambulance	Michael Bay	Universal Pictures	co-production with Endeavor Content, Bay Films and Project X Entertainment	$40 million	$46.7 million	69%
2022	Top Gun: Maverick	Joseph Kosinski	Paramount Pictures	uncredited; co-production with Skydance Media, TC Productions and Don Simpson/Jerry Bruckheimer Films	$177 million	$1.493 billion	96%
2023	Transformers: Rise of the Beasts	Steven Caple Jr.	Paramount Pictures	co-production with Di Bonaventura Pictures, Skydance Media, Hasbro and Bayhem Films	$195–200 million	$346.2 million	54%
2023	Mission: Impossible – Dead Reckoning Part One	Christopher McQuarrie	Paramount Pictures	uncredited; co-production with Skydance Media, TC Productions and C2 Motion Picture Group	$291 million (gross) $219 million (net)	$567.5 million	96%
2023	Under the Boardwalk	David Soren	Paramount Pictures	uncredited; co-production with Paramount Animation and Big Kid Pictures			
2024	The Tiger's Apprentice	Raman Hui	Paramount+	co-production with Paramount Animation and Jane Startz Productions			
2024	Transformers One	Josh Cooley	Paramount Pictures	co-production with Paramount Animation, Hasbro Entertainment, Di Bonaventura Pictures and Bayhem Films	$75–147 million	$128.3 million	89%
2025	Mission: Impossible – The Final Reckoning	Christopher McQuarrie	Paramount Pictures	uncredited; co-production with Skydance Media and TC Productions	$300–400 million	$206 million	80%
Upcoming films
Year	Film	Director	Distributor	Notes	Status		
TBA	Cut And Run	TBA	TBA	co-production with Nine Stories Productions	In development		
TBA	The Champions	Ben Stiller	TBA	co-production with ITV Studios America and Dirty Films	In development		
TBA	Horrorstör	Jonathan Levine	Searchlight Pictures	co-production with Megamix and Aperture Entertainment	In development		
TBA	Stalag-X	Francis Lawrence	TBA	co-production with about:blank	In development		
TBA	Vulcan's Hammer	Francis Lawrence	TBA	co-production with about:blank and Electric Shepherd Productions	In development		
TBA	The Wild Geese	TBA	TBA	co-production with Providence Film Group	In development		
