= Mohawk (2017 film) =

- Official poster
- Directed by: Ted Geoghegan
- Written by: Ted Geoghegan; Grady Hendrix
- Produced by: Travis Stevens
- Starring: Kaniehtiio Horn; Eamon Farren; Justin Rain; Ezra Buzzington; Noah Segan; Jonathan Huber
- Cinematography: Karim Hussain
- Edited by: Brody Gusar
- Music by: Wojciech Golczewski
- Production company: Snowfort Pictures
- Distributed by: Dark Sky Films
- Release date: 15 July 2017 (Fantasia Film Festival)
- Running time: 91 minutes
- Country: United States
- Languages: English; Mohawk; Québécois French

Mohawk is a 2017 American period action horror film directed by Ted Geoghegan, co-written by Geoghegan and novelist Grady Hendrix, and starring Kaniehtiio Horn, Ezra Buzzington, Noah Segan, and professional wrestler Jonathan "Brodie Lee" Huber in the only feature film appearance he made before his death.

== Plot ==
Late one night in 1814, a young Mohawk woman named Okwaho or "Oak" (Kaniehtiio Horn) and one of her lovers, Calvin, gets into an argument with her mother Wentahawi (Sheri Foster) over whether her neutral tribe, who are being violently slaughtered by new Americans, should get involved in the War of 1812. Her two lovers — a Mohawk warrior named Calvin (Justin Rain) and a British soldier named Joshua (Eamon Farren), one of whom is the father of her unborn child — push for retaliation, which ultimately leads to Calvin sneaking off later that same night to light a nearby American encampment on fire, killing 22 sleeping American soldiers.

Six soldiers and their civilian translator Yancy (Noah Segan) escape from the fire and, seeking their own revenge, track down the trio the next morning. A skirmish occurs, which results in the death of Wentahawi and the American Commander, Colonel Charles Hawkes (Jack Gwaltney). A power-hungry and brutal subordinate, Captain Hezekiah Holt (Ezra Buzzington), takes control of the Americans and demands violent retribution. Chasing Oak and the two men, the Americans capture, torture, and kill Calvin at the cost of more Americans being killed, including Holt's son Myles (Ian Colletti). When Oak and Joshua are finally captured at a desolate French-Canadian mission (where Holt and his men have already murdered Oak's uncle and cousins), Holt kills Joshua with his sabre and shoots Oak in the chest, seemingly killing her. The remaining Americans then leave to return to their base at Fort George.

Oak survives the injury, shaves her head into a bloody Mohawk, and constructs a makeshift suit of armor out of remains of a pregnant deer and its unborn fawn. She stalks the last three Americans (Holt, Yancy, and Private Lachlan Allsopp (Jonathan Huber)) through the darkening forest, killing Yancy and Allsopp before revealing herself to Holt. He becomes disoriented and, through dream-like supernatural means, ends up back at his burnt-out camp. Having abandoned his pistol and sword in the forest, he and Oak fight hand to hand. She finally kills Holt by throwing him onto the burnt remains of a tree, impaling him through the heart. Oak, severely injured, walks away from his corpse and, as she leaves, is witnessed by a Mohawk family, who look upon her like a deity.

== Cast ==
- Kaniehtiio Horn as Okwaho ("Oak")
- Ezra Buzzington as Hezekiah Holt
- Eamon Farren as Joshua Pinsmail
- Justin Rain as Calvin Two Rivers
- Jonathan Huber as Lachlan Allsopp
- Robert Longstreet as Sherwood Beal
- Noah Segan as Yancy
- Ian Colletti as Myles Holt
- Sheri Foster as Wentahawi
- Jack Gwaltney as Charles Hawkes
- Guy W. Gane III as Taylor

== Production ==
The film was written by director Ted Geoghegan and novelist Grady Hendrix. In 2015, the two were announced as co-writing a film titled Satanic Panic, which Geoghegan was then slated to direct. When Satanic Panic was put on hold, the two chose to write this project together – based on Geoghegan's desire to work on a project about marginalized people and Hendrix's encyclopedic knowledge of The War of 1812. The project was produced by Snowfort Pictures and Dark Sky Films, who had previously produced in Geoghegan's directorial debut, We Are Still Here.

Mohawk was shot in Upstate New York in June 2016, and filmed two days at Syracuse's Skä•noñh Great Law of Peace Center.

Actress Kaniehtiio Horn, who plays the film's lead, Oak, is a native Mohawk. Actor Guy W. Gane III, who plays Taylor, appeared in Geoghegan's directorial debut, We Are Still Here as the vengeful Civil War-era ghost Dagmar.

== Release ==
Mohawk World Premiered at Montreal, Quebec's Fantasia International Film Festival on 15 July 2017. Its U.S. Premiere occurred at Grauman's Egyptian Theatre in Los Angeles, California on 8 October 2017 as part of BeyondFest. The film was released in select cinemas and on Video-on-Demand on 2 March 2018.

== Soundtrack ==
Mohawk (Original Motion Picture Soundtrack)

Soundtrack album by Wojciech Golczewski
- Released: 1 February 2018
- Genres: Electronic, Ambient
- Length: 21:00
- Label: Data Airlines
- Producer: Wojciech Golczewski

The score to Mohawk was written and composed by Polish composer Wojciech Golczewski, who had scored director Geoghegan's previous directorial effort, We Are Still Here. The album's artwork was created by Damian Bajowski, with additional mastering by Dubmood. It was released on vinyl and in digital formats on 1 February 2018.

=== Track listing ===
No.	Title	Length
1.	"Mohawk"	2:22
2.	"The Woods"	3:34
3.	"Wentahawi"	4:00
4.	"Calvin Attacks"	1:09
5.	"Waterfall (Alternate)"	1:41
6.	"Back from the Dead (Alternate)"	4:23
7.	"Calvin Speaks"	2:01
8.	"Tortures"	4:21
Total length:		21:00

== Reception ==
On review aggregator website Rotten Tomatoes, Mohawk has an approval rating of 83% based on 42 reviews, with an average rating of 6.65/10. The site's critics' consensus reads: "Mohawk delivers effective period horror while skillfully weaving in sociopolitical subtext that pushes the film past genre -- and budgetary -- constraints." Metacritic gave the film a score of 71 out of 100 based on 12 critical reviews.

A follow-up to Geoghegan's haunted house thriller We Are Still Here, Mohawk's strong socio-political undertones were embraced by the media. RogerEbert.com critic Simon Abrams noted in his three-star review of the film that it "has the same political urgency as Wes Craven's now-classic, but rough-around-the-edges early films, like The Last House on the Left and The Hills Have Eyes." Los Angeles Times critic Noel Murray noted in his positive review that "Mohawk is a gripping and despairing action picture, about how we can't seem to stop trying to destroy those we distrust — including ourselves".

IndieWire stated, in a feature on the film, "While studios continue to downplay Native American experiences, Ted Geoghegan's gripping new thriller puts their brutal persecution in context."
