= Horrorstör =

2014 horror comedy novel by Grady Hendrix

- Author: Grady Hendrix
- Audio read by: Tai Sammons; Bronson Pinchot
- Illustrator: Michael Rogalski
- Cover artist: Christine Ferrara
- Language: English
- Genre: Horror comedy
- Published: 2014
- Publisher: Quirk Books
- Publication place: United States
- Media type: Print, e-book, audiobook
- Pages: 248 pages
- ISBN: 1594745269
- OCLC: 904387370
- Preceded by: Satan Loves You
- Followed by: My Best Friend's Exorcism

Horrorstör is a 2014 horror comedy novel that was written by Grady Hendrix and illustrated by Michael Rogalski. The novel was released in paperback on September 23, 2014 through Quirk Books and is set in ORSK, an IKEA-esque store that has been experiencing supernatural phenomena. The audiobook release was narrated by Tai Sammons and Bronson Pinchot. The book's events take place largely over the course of one night in ORSK and the story is accompanied by illustrations of ORSK products, which grow more sinister as the book progresses.

Television rights to the series were optioned in 2015 by the Jackal Group, but fell through; as of 2020, the film rights have been optioned by New Republic Pictures.

== Synopsis ==
The novel follows a group of people—store manager Basil, and employees Amy and Ruth Anne—who stay overnight at ORSK to investigate strange acts of vandalism. The book particularly focuses on Amy, who is unhappy because she views her work at ORSK as an unfulfilling dead-end job. During a patrol of the store, Amy and Ruth Anne come across fellow employees Trinity and Matt, who have snuck into the store to record paranormal phenomena; and Carl, a homeless man who has been sleeping in the store without anyone knowing. Although the group decides against calling the police, Amy reveals that she called them earlier over some minor strange occurrences earlier in the night.

Trinity convinces the others, minus Basil (as he has gone outside to wait for the police), to hold a séance. During the séance, they make contact with Warden Worth, who possesses Carl and informs everyone that he will take them into his "Beehive" and cure them of their mental illnesses. Worth then slits Carl's throat. Basil returns and is horrified by the amount of blood, then observes that Carl's body is missing. The group decides to search for him and in the process find a door leading to an old asylum that no longer exists. Everyone is abducted and subjected to various cruel "treatments" except for Basil, who manages to find and rescue Amy. The two are separated after a group of Worth's inmates (all of whom are ghosts) attack Basil and drag him off. Amy nearly succumbs to the temptation to continue Worth's treatments, as his earlier treatment had nearly convinced her that her life is worthless, but she fights off the urge after seeing Trinity put through a similar torture treatment. Amy frees Trinity, only for her to run off in fear, and makes it successfully out of the building. She returns upon realizing that she is the others' only hope of escape, and that running away would mean quitting, which would prove Worth correct in his assessment of her failings.

Back in the store, Amy discovers that the land occupied by the ORSK store had previously been the site of a prison that was closed, due to Worth's cruel treatments. Amy is unsuccessful in rescuing Ruth Anne before the woman commits suicide, but frees Basil and helps him keep sane by talking to him about his sister, for whom he is a caregiver. Before they can find the others and escape, the two are confronted by Worth, who tries to trick them into becoming part of his Beehive. Amy overcomes him by convincing the penitents that they are free and Worth has no control over them. The ghosts overpower Worth and destroy him, but instead of moving on, the ghosts capture Basil and Amy in wardrobes and try to drown them. They barely manage to escape the store before it completely floods with water.

Outside, Amy and Basil are treated by emergency teams, who inform them that they are the only ones who made it out of the store. ORSK's corporate people offer them cushy corporate jobs in exchange for their silence, which Amy refuses out of disgust. Months pass; during this time, a new store, Planet Baby, is built out from the remains of ORSK. Amy gets a job there and, on the first day, encounters Basil. The two vow to rescue Matt and Trinity, a task Basil says will be difficult because the penitents are less organized now that Worth is gone. The book ends with an advertisement stating that Planet Baby will hold a 24-hour sale, allowing patrons to remain in the store overnight.

== Reception ==
Critical reception has been mostly positive and the Gazette praised the work for its social critique. The Boston Globe and Nerdist both wrote mixed reviews, with Nerdist stating that the lead character "keeps the book afloat with the promise of more horror to come, but like the IKEA furniture that inspired it, Horrorstor is brutally functional while losing out on some needed form." The Washington Post was more positive in their review, praising Horrorstör for its characters and its balance between comedy and horror.

== Film ==
In 2015, the Jackal Group announced that they had optioned the television rights to Horrorstör and that Fox had ordered a pilot episode. The project was to have been executive produced by Charlie Kaufman and directed by Josh Schwartz, with a pilot script written by Michael Vukadinovich.

The project fell through and, in 2020, film rights to Horrorstör were acquired by New Republic Pictures. Brad Fischer, Brian Oliver, and Adam Goldworm were named as producers for the movie.

In 2026, Searchlight Pictures acquired the rights to Horrorstör, with Jonathan Levine writing the film adaptation screenplay. Fischer, Oliver and Goldworm are still set to produce the film, accompanied by Gillian Bohrer. Hendrix will act as executive producer, alongside Quirk Books.
