= U Turn (1997 film) =

1997 American film by Oliver Stone

- Theatrical release poster
- Directed by: Oliver Stone
- Written by: John Ridley
- Based on: Stray Dogs by John Ridley
- Produced by: Dan Halsted; Clayton Townsend
- Starring: Sean Penn; Jennifer Lopez; Nick Nolte; Powers Boothe; Claire Danes; Joaquin Phoenix; Billy Bob Thornton; Jon Voight
- Cinematography: Robert Richardson
- Edited by: Hank Corwin; Thomas J. Nordberg
- Music by: Ennio Morricone
- Production companies: TriStar Pictures; Phoenix Pictures; Illusion Entertainment Group; Clyde Is Hungry Films
- Distributed by: Sony Pictures Releasing
- Release dates: August 27, 1997 (Telluride); October 3, 1997 (United States)
- Running time: 125 minutes
- Country: United States
- Language: English
- Budget: $19 million (estimated)
- Box office: $6.6 million (US)

U Turn is a 1997 American neo-noir crime thriller film directed by Oliver Stone, and starring Sean Penn, Billy Bob Thornton, Jennifer Lopez, Jon Voight, Powers Boothe, Joaquin Phoenix, Claire Danes and Nick Nolte. It is based on the book Stray Dogs by John Ridley, who also wrote the screenplay. U Turn premiered at the Telluride Film Festival on August 27, 1997, before being released by Sony Pictures Releasing on October 3, 1997, in the United States. The film grossed $6.6 million in the United States against an estimated $19 million budget, and received mixed reviews from critics.

== Plot ==
In Arizona, Bobby Cooper drives his 1964½ Ford Mustang convertible heading to Vegas by way of Globe and Phoenix to repay gangster Mr. Arkady. His journey takes a turn, three miles outside of Superior, when the radiator hose bursts. At Harlin's Garage, Darrell claims repairs will take time, asking about Bobby's bandaged left hand. Taking his money pack, Bobby locks his handgun in the trunk.

Bobby walks into town and meets Grace, who is walking home with her new drapes. Bobby offers his assistance, and she invites him home to shower, where it's revealed Arkady dismembered two of Bobby's fingers as punishment for the overdue debt. Bobby kisses Grace, but he's interrupted and assaulted by her much-older husband, Jake McKenna. Walking back to Superior, Jake picks Bobby up, asking if Bobby would kill Grace for money. Bobby dismisses Jake's proposal.

Thieves Boyd and Ed rob Jamilla's groceria, then demand Bobby's pack. When Bobby refuses, Boyd pistol-whips him, taking his $13,000. Jamilla retaliates with a shotgun, killing both robbers, but shredding and bloodying Bobby's cash. Unable to pay Darrell an exorbitant $150, Bobby phones acquaintances in vain for help, including Arkady, who sends Sergei after Bobby. At Waldorf Café, Bobby buys a beer from Flo. Troubled teenager Jenny flirts with Bobby, incurring ire from her jealous boyfriend Toby N. "TNT" Tucker. Sheriff Virgil Potter enters, and TNT backs off.

Desperate to recoup his $13,000, Bobby approaches Jake, who bought a $50,000 life insurance policy on Grace, but Jake needs it to look like suicide. Bobby tries pushing her off a cliff, but pulls her back. They have sex, but Grace stops short. Grace reveals her Native American mother was Jake's mistress, making him her stepfather. However, he began sexually abusing her, which drove her mother into alcoholism. Grace's mother was found dead in the cliffside, supposedly by suicide, though Grace suspects foul play. She was then forced to marry Jake after his divorce. Grace asks Bobby to kill Jake and steal his $100,000, and they can run away together. Bobby distrustfully refuses. Darrell extorts another $50 from Bobby, who discovers Darrell took Bobby's gun; Bobby grabs a wrench, but Darrell wields a tire-iron. Bobby rages, trapped. Lacking fare to Mexico, Bobby hysterically begs, "They're gonna kill me!" The bus station clerk gives him the ticket, but he has to run from Sergei, who's arrested for speeding by Potter. TNT attacks, destroying Bobby's ticket; Bobby loses it, badly beating TNT, whom Jenny comforts.

Out of options, Bobby phones Grace, who unlocks Jake's back door. While having sex with his daughter, Jake hears Bobby entering, and brandishes Bobby's own gun (which Darrell gave Jake). Bobby claims killing Jake was Grace's idea, and he'll kill Grace for only $200 to get his car back and leave town. Jake allows it, but Grace and Bobby form a ruse to lure Jake, eventually killing him with Grace's tomahawk. They unlock Jake's safe to find $200,000, and have sex on Jake's bloody bed.

Bobby gets his Mustang back from Darrell, picking up Grace and the money. Leaving Superior, Potter intercepts them, revealing he too has been sleeping with Grace, who blames Bobby for Jake's death. Bobby realizes that she had also manipulated Potter with the same plan to kill Jake and run away together. Grace admits she went for Bobby because she was tired of waiting for Potter, who says he wants to marry Grace despite having a new family of his own. Potter tells Bobby at gunpoint that Grace is Jake's biological daughter, angering her. She kills Potter with Bobby's gun.

As they drive off, Grace confesses she was Jake's illegitimate daughter from his affair with her mother, and she vents her resentment towards both her father's sexual abuse and the town of Superior. As they dispose Jake and Potter's bodies, Bobby hits Grace to retrieve back his gun, telling her that he no longer trusts her and they will part ways once he gets to his destination. Grace pushes Bobby into the ravine, severely injuring him. Grace realizes Bobby has the ignition key and climbs down to retrieve it. Bobby manipulates Grace to come nearer and strangles her, but she shoots him before she dies. Bobby climbs out and departs in the car, but Darrell's shoddy replacement hose bursts. Bobby laughs about his continuing bad luck as he looks up at the sky where vultures circle, aware of his impending death as he bleeds out.

== Cast ==
- Sean Penn as Bobby Cooper
- Nick Nolte as Jake McKenna
- Jennifer Lopez as Grace McKenna
- Powers Boothe as Sheriff Virgil Potter
- Claire Danes as Jenny
- Joaquin Phoenix as Toby N. "TNT" Tucker
- Billy Bob Thornton as Darrell
- Jon Voight as Blind Indian
- Abraham Benrubi as Biker #1
- Julie Hagerty as Flo
- Bo Hopkins as Ed
- Valery Nikolaev as Mr. Arkady
- Sean Stone as Boy In Grocery Store
- Ilia Volok as Sergei
- Brent Briscoe as Boyd
- Sheri Foster as Grace's Mother
- Laurie Metcalf as Bus Station Clerk
- Liv Tyler as Girl In Bus Station

== Production ==
U Turn was filmed during November 1996–January 1997 on location in Superior, Arizona, and other areas of Arizona and California, including the Coachella Valley. It was filmed entirely on reversal film stock, Kodak 5239, to give an extra harsh look to the hostile environment; they wound up shooting 75 percent of the film on the stock, seeking advice from Spike Lee and Malik Hassan Sayeed, who had used it on Clockers. When production moved to Los Angeles after a short break, Jeff Kimball took over cinematographer duties from Robert Richardson; Richardson had moved on to The Horse Whisperer.

=== Casting ===
For the Toby N. Tucker role, Joaquin Phoenix said small-town style gave him the inspiration and the idea for the haircut, which was "TNT" (the character's initials) shaved on the back of his head. "These kids in these small towns, these fads that just roll over them," he told Rough Cut Magazine in October 1998. "Like, five years pass and they still hang on to them. So, I thought it was really great if he shaves his name, he thinks he's really notorious."

== Reception ==
Reaction by critics to U Turn was mixed. Roger Ebert gave the film 1½ stars out of four, deeming it a "repetitive, pointless exercise in genre filmmaking—the kind of film where you distract yourself by making a list of the sources". James Berardinelli rated the film three stars out of four, stating "for those who enjoy movies on the edge, U-Turn offers just the trajectory you might expect." Mick LaSalle of the San Francisco Chronicle wrote that it "demonstrates a filmmaker in complete command of his craft and with little control over his impulses". U Turn holds a 59% rating on Rotten Tomatoes based on 54 reviews, with the consensus: "U-Turn is a lurid, stylish lark that boasts striking moments but lacks the focus and weight of Oliver Stone's best work." On Metacritic, it has a rating of 54 out of 100 based on 20 reviews, indicating mixed or average reviews. Audiences polled by CinemaScore gave the film an average grade of "C+" on an A+ to F scale.

Later, Oliver Stone said: “Certain people really liked U Turn. More than you might think claimed it was the one they “most liked” of my films. It’s certainly different, and its incest storyline was verboten to the average American viewer. Let’s just say, you need a sense of humor for this one."

The film was nominated for two Golden Raspberry Awards: Worst Director (which went to Kevin Costner for The Postman) and Worst Supporting Actor (Jon Voight, also for Most Wanted; ultimately, he "lost" to Dennis Rodman for Double Team). It was also included on Siskel and Ebert's "Worst Films of 1997" episode. In the episode, Gene Siskel reflected that: "U Turn [had] the same highly stylized violence as Stone's Natural Born Killers, but without that film's intellectual content, U Turn seems like Stone's attempt at a commercial hit – and he failed, miserably."

== Remake ==
The film was remade in India as the 2004 action thriller Musafir by Sanjay Gupta. The film had a more favorable critical reception, with some considering it better than U Turn.

== See also ==
- Tarantinoesque film
