= My Best Friend's Exorcism =

2016 novel by Grady Hendrix

- Author: Grady Hendrix
- Audio read by: Emily Woo Zeller
- Language: English
- Genre: Horror
- Published: May 17, 2016
- Publisher: Quirk Books, Blackstone Audio
- Publication place: United States
- Media type: Print, e-book, audiobook
- Pages: 336 pages
- ISBN: 1594748624
- Preceded by: Horrorstör
- Followed by: Paperbacks from Hell

My Best Friend's Exorcism is a 2016 horror novel by Grady Hendrix. A hardback edition was published on May 17, 2016, through Quirk Books and an audiobook narrated by Emily Woo Zeller was released through Blackstone Audio.

A film adaptation directed by Damon Thomas from a screenplay by Jenna Lamia was released in 2022 on Prime Video.

== Synopsis ==
The year is 1988 and Abby Rivers has just started her sophomore year of high school in South Carolina. She is glad to have her best friend Gretchen Lang at her side, as they have been inseparable since they met at Abby's 10th birthday back in 1982. Gretchen was the only one to attend Abby's E.T.-themed birthday party at the skating rink and their friendship was cemented ever since.

The novel then goes through their relationship from that point on, which includes singing into hairbrushes to Madonna, getting their hair braided in Jamaica, and dealing with the awkwardness of growing up, whether it is bad acne or overprotective parents. They even try LSD with their friends Glee and Margaret at Margaret's lake house—a decision that results in Gretchen disappearing into the woods and returning a few hours later. Her friends are concerned, but Gretchen claims that nothing happened. Her actions belie her words, as she begins acting increasingly more erratic, prompting Abby to suspect that Gretchen might actually be possessed by a demon.

== Reception ==
My Best Friend's Exorcism received reviews from Library Journal and Kirkus Reviews, the latter of which stated, "Certainly not for all readers, but anyone interested in seeing William Peter Blatty's infamous The Exorcist (1971) by way of Heathers shouldn't miss it." Booklist also drew comparisons to Heathers and commented that the book was "totally awesome". The A.V. Club wrote a favorable review for the book, writing "Hendrix’s prose walks the fine line between comedy and horror throughout, delivering a simultaneously heartwarming and terrifying tale of teenage friendship, which is something most of us can relate to, exorcism or not."

== Film ==
In November 2018, it was announced that Endeavor Content had won the film adaptation rights for My Best Friend's Exorcism. Christopher Landon and Ellen Goldsmith-Vein were announced to produce. Damon Thomas was announced as director. The film was released on Prime Video on September 30, 2022.
