= Amanda Cohen =

Canadian chef

- Born: Ottawa, Ontario
- Occupation: chef
- Years active: 1999–present
- Known for: Iron Chef Canada
- Notable work: Dirt Candy
- Spouse: Grady Hendrix

Amanda Cohen is the chef and owner of Dirt Candy restaurant in New York City. Although she specializes in vegetarian cuisine, she herself is not a vegetarian (although she used to be).

== Biography ==
She graduated from the Natural Gourmet Cookery School and went on to work at (among other restaurants) Angelica Kitchen, Bobby Flay’s Mesa Grill, and Blanche’s Organic Café. In 2008, she opened Dirt Candy.

In 2012, she published the Dirt Candy: A Cookbook.

In 2018, she was profiled in Maya Gallus's documentary film The Heat: A Kitchen (R)evolution.

== Competition ==
In 2010, she competed against Masaharu Morimoto on Iron Chef America in "Battle Vegetable" and lost. Since 2018, she has been featured as one of the Iron Chefs on Iron Chef Canada.

== Personal life ==
Cohen is married to writer Grady Hendrix, a coauthor of her cookbook Dirt Candy, A Cookbook: Flavor-Forward Food From the Upstart New York City Vegetarian Restaurant.

== TV appearances ==
- 2018: Iron Chef Canada
- 2018: Top Chef Canada
- 2015: CBS This Morning
- 2010: Iron Chef America
