= Gotham Group =

Management film and television production company founded in 1994

- Founded: 1994; 32 years ago
- Founder: Ellen Goldsmith-Vein
- Headquarters: Los Angeles, California, United States
- Website: gotham-group.com

The Gotham Group is an American diversified management film and television production company in the entertainment industry. The company was founded by Ellen Goldsmith-Vein in 1994. Goldsmith-Vein and her company have produced such projects as The Spiderwick Chronicles, Disney's Stargirl duology and The Maze Runner franchise.

== Filmography ==
=== Films ===
Title	Year	Notes
The Spiderwick Chronicles	2008	Uncredited; co-produced with Nickelodeon Movies, The Kennedy/Marshall Company and Atmosphere Pictures; distributed by Paramount Pictures
Abduction	2011	Uncredited; co-produced with Vertigo Entertainment, Quick Six Entertainment and Tailor Made; distributed by Lionsgate Films
Life of Crime	2013	Co-produced with Hyde Park Entertainment, Image Nation Abu Dhabi, StarStream Entertainment and Abbolita Productions; distributed by Lionsgate Films and Roadside Attractions
Camp X-Ray	2014	Co-produced with GNK Productions, Rough House Pictures and The Young Gang; distributed by IFC Films
The Maze Runner	2014	Co-produced with Temple Hill Entertainment; distributed by 20th Century Fox
Blackway	2015	Co-produced with Enderby Entertainment
Maze Runner: The Scorch Trials	2015	Co-produced with Temple Hill Entertainment; distributed by 20th Century Fox
Stephanie	2017	Co-produced with Blumhouse Productions; distributed by Universal Pictures
Maze Runner: The Death Cure	2018	Co-produced with Temple Hill Entertainment, Oddball Entertainment; distributed by 20th Century Fox
Kodachrome	2018	Co-produced with 21 Laps Entertainment and Motion Picture Capital; distributed by Netflix
Stargirl	2020	Co-produced with Walt Disney Pictures and Hahnscape Entertainment; distributed by Disney+
All Together Now	2020	Co-produced with Temple Hill Entertainment and Thunderhead Pictures; distributed by Netflix
Hollywood Stargirl	2022	Co-produced with Walt Disney Pictures; distributed by Disney+
My Best Friend's Exorcism	2022	Co-produced with Endeavor Content and Quirk Books; distributed by Amazon Prime Video
Wendell & Wild	2022	Co-produced with Netflix Animation Studios, Monkeypaw Productions and Principato-Young Entertainment; distributed by Netflix
Juror #2	2024	Co-produced with Dichotomy Films and Malpaso Productions; distributed by Warner Bros. Pictures
The Woman in Cabin 10	2025	Co-produced with Sister; distributed by Netflix
Springsteen: Deliver Me from Nowhere	2025	Co-produced with 20th Century Studios; distributed by 20th Century Studios
The Social Reckoning	2026	Co-produced with Columbia Pictures, Alcon Entertainment and Escape Artists; distributed by Sony Pictures Releasing
The Black Hand	TBA	Co-produced with Appian Way Productions
Exile on Main Street: A Season in Hell with the Rolling Stones	TBA	
By All	TBA	co-produced with Legendary Pictures

=== Television ===
Title	Year	Network	Notes
Creature Comforts America	2007–2008	CBS/Animal Planet	Co-produced with Aardman Animations
Elmo's Christmas Countdown	2007	ABC	Co-produced with Sesame Workshop; TV special
Percy Jackson and the Olympians	2023–present	Disney+	Co-produced with Co-Lab21, Mythomagic, Quaker Moving Pictures and 20th Television
The Spiderwick Chronicles	2024	The Roku Channel	Co-produced with Lightbulb Farm Productions, 20th Television and Paramount Television Studios
WondLa	2024–2025	Apple TV	Co-produced with Skydance Animation
Washington Black	2025	Hulu	Co-produced with Indian Meadow Productions and 20th Television
RWBY	2026	TBD	Co-produced with VIZ Media. Starting with Volume 10.
