= Dirt Candy =

Vegetarian restaurant in New York

- Interactive map of Dirt Candy

Restaurant information
- Established: 2008
- Owner: Amanda Cohen
- Chef: Amanda Cohen
- Food type: Vegetarian
- Rating: Michelin Guide
- Location: 86 Allen Street, on the Lower East Side of Manhattan, New York City, 10002, United States
- Coordinates: 40.717929°N 73.990738°W
- Website: www.dirtcandynyc.com

Dirt Candy is a vegetarian restaurant on the Lower East Side of Manhattan in New York City. Chef and owner Amanda Cohen opened the restaurant in a small East Village space in 2008, and moved to its present location in 2015. It has received critical attention for its creative dishes which often focus on a single vegetable.

== History ==
Amanda Cohen first opened Dirt Candy in Manhattan's East Village, with a small 18-seat space on East 9th Street, in October 2008. The name is based on Cohen's view that vegetables are "candy from the earth". Cohen is not a vegetarian, but loves vegetables and has a negative opinion of most other vegetarian restaurants for their lack of creativity and politicization of the food.

In 2015, the restaurant moved to a larger space on Allen Street on the Lower East Side. With the new location, the menu expanded, a bar was added, and Cohen began a policy of no tipping, instead adding 20% surcharge to every check and paying employees a fair living wage.

The restaurant disposed of its a la carte menu in August 2017, instead operating with only a two-tiered tasting menu. Cohen said it was because she wanted the dining experience to be a special occasion.

== Reception ==
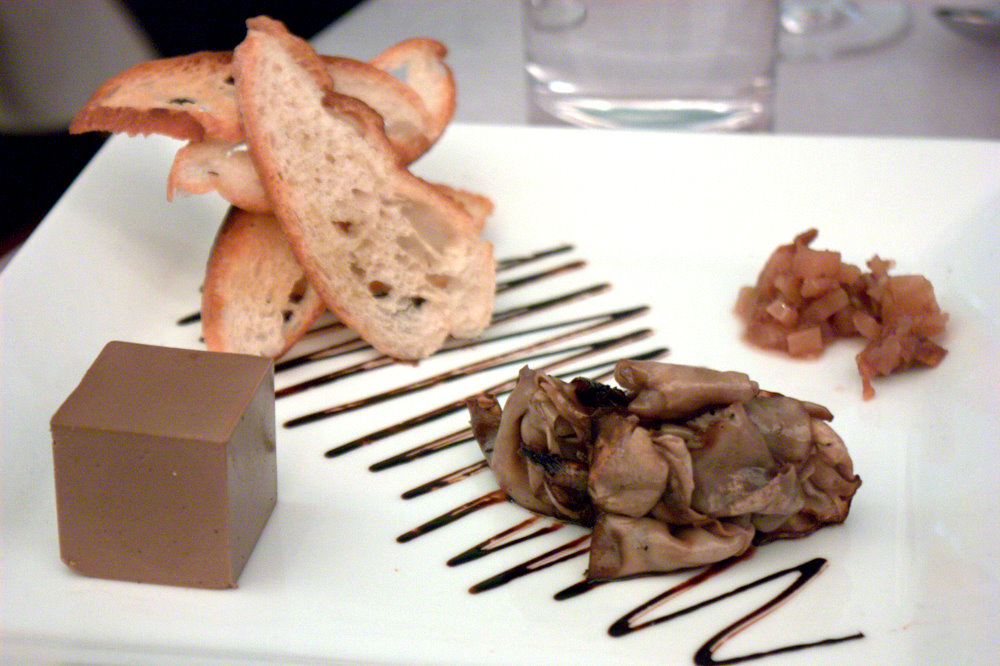
Portobello mousse

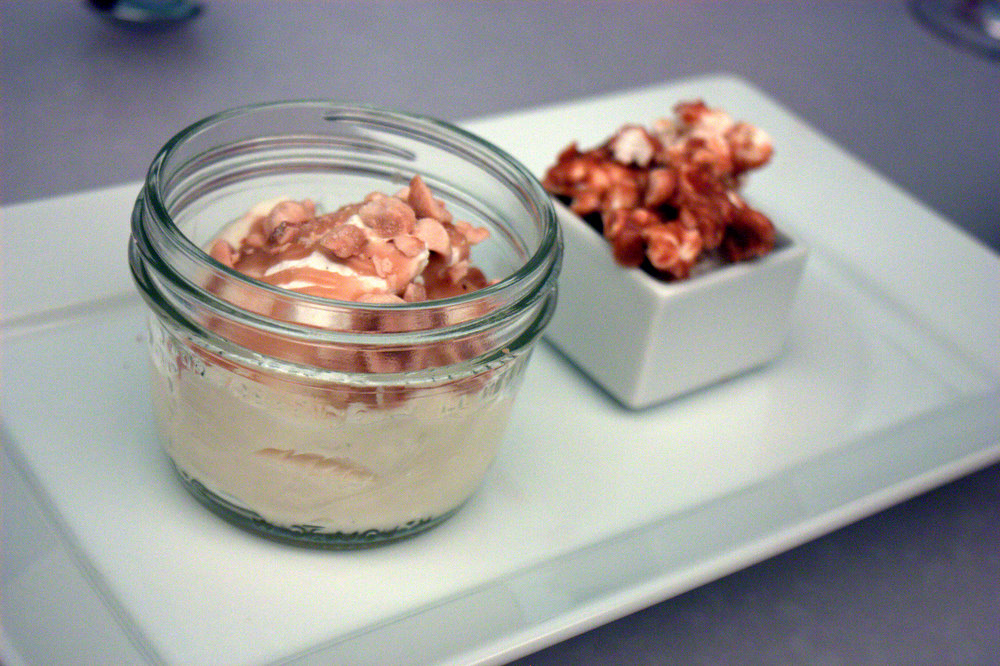
Popcorn pudding

Dirt Candy has attracted critical attention for the quality, creativity, and presentation of its food. The New York Times described Cohen as "waging war on the 'eat your vegetables' mind-set" with "vegetable cookery that is original, clever, visually arresting and, above all, a lot of fun to eat."

Several reviewers have commented on the name. In one of the earliest reviews, The New Yorker's Kate Julian wrote that, in contrast to the earthy-sounding name, the food and decor "evoke some utopian future where the people have renounced not just meat but also soil, in favor of brightly colored, hydroponically grown produce."

The New York Times wrote a mostly positive write-up a few months after it opened, praising the food as "artfully composed" but criticizing its lighting. Its longer review in 2012 gave it two stars ("very good"). It has appeared on several publications' lists of best restaurants in the city. New York Magazine ranked it top restaurant on the Lower East Side in 2018, calling its food "careful, complex, and delicious, but not overly science-y".

Dirt Candy has also received some attention for Cohen's outspokenness on food and restaurant industry issues. She has advocated for greater coverage of women chefs, notably writing a critical response to Time magazine's "The Gods of Food" feature, which included in its list of "gods" only male chefs. In the blog that she kept from the restaurant's opening in 2008 until 2014, she frequently responded to reviews, offering rebuttals and counter-criticism. For example, she took issue with an early, mostly positive write-up in The New York Times, in particular objecting to its negative description of the lighting, the conduct of its photographer, and for generally reviewing restaurants too soon after opening.

== Cookbook ==
In 2012, Cohen worked with her husband, writer Grady Hendrix, and artist Ryan Dunlavey to publish Dirt Candy: A Cookbook. Pete Wells noted Cohen's consistent use of humor in his New York Times review, in her interviews, through her blog, and visible in her professional work such that a "cookbook in comic-book form [seems] not just sensible but inevitable."

Emily Weinstein of The New York Times Diner's Journal wrote that the book is "not a straight cookbook, nor is it a memoir. Instead, it's a transparent, sometimes triumphant, more often self-deprecating look at how the restaurant runs, including the agony of working with contractors to build the 350-square-foot East Village space and why a salad is $14."

== See also ==
- List of Michelin-starred restaurants in New York City
