= Ted Geoghegan =

American director

Ted J. Geoghegan
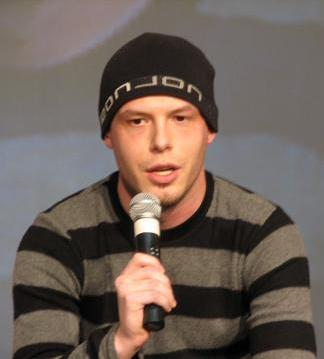
- Born: August 10, 1979 (age 47); Beaverton, Oregon, U.S.
- Education: University of Montana
- Occupations: Screenwriter; film director; publicist
- Writing career
- Genre: Horror

Ted Geoghegan (born August 10, 1979) is an American filmmaker and publicist. He grew up in Great Falls, Montana, attending private and public schools and studying film extensively. He attended the University of Montana in Missoula, Montana and attained a degree in English Education.

A two-time SXSW filmmaker who was nominated for a Saturn Award in 2024, Geoghegan is best-known for his work in the horror genre. He is also a genre film publicist and film historian featured on the BBC.

== Filmography ==
Short film

Year	Title	Director	Writer	Producer	Notes
2001	Moon		Yes		Segment of Bites: The Werewolf Chronicles
2004	The International Playboys' First Movie: Ghouls Gone Wild	Yes	Yes	Yes	
2011	Night of the Pumpkin		Yes		
2012	The House That Cried Blood			Yes	

Feature film

Year	Title	Director	Writer	Notes
2001	Demonium		Yes	
2001	Nikos the Impaler		Yes	
2007	Barricade		Yes	
2008	Don't Wake the Dead		Yes	
2009	Sweatshop		Yes	
2011	The Disco Exorcist		Uncredited	Script revisions
2013	The Berlin File		Yes	English dialogue
2015	We Are Still Here	Yes	Yes	
2017	Mohawk	Yes	Yes	
2019	Satanic Panic		Story	
2023	Brooklyn 45	Yes	Yes	

Producer

- Barricade (2007)
- 100 Tears (2007)
- Slasher (2007)
- Darkness Surrounds Roberta (2008)
- Graceland (2012)
- ABCs of Death 2 (2014)
- ABC's of Death 2½ (2016)
- Molli and Max in the Future (2023)

Actor

- Mutation 2: Generation Dead (2001)
- 100 Tears (2007)
- Hatchet III (2013)
- The Ranger (2018)
