= Cathy Ang =

American actress

- Born: Fort Dodge, Iowa, U.S.
- Education: New York University (BM)
- Occupation: Actress
- Years active: 2018–present

Cathy Ang is an American actress. She is best known for her television role as Lily Goldenblatt in the Sex and the City spinoff series And Just Like That..., as well as voicing Fei Fei in Netflix's Over the Moon.

== Early life and education ==
Ang was born to Chinese-Filipino parents in Fort Dodge, Iowa, but spent much of her childhood in Cupertino, California. Ang attended New York University, where she received a Bachelor of Music in Vocal Performance from the Steinhardt School of Culture, Education, and Human Development. She graduated in 2017.

== Filmography ==
Television
Year	Title	Role	Notes
2019	Ramy	White Castle Cashier	Episode: "No Me Quitte Pas"
2021	The Blessing	Trixie	Episode: "The Grandmother"
2021–2025	And Just Like That...	Lily Goldenblatt	Series Regular
2022	Harley Quinn	Lisa Snart / Golden Glider	Episode: "The 83rd Annual Villy Awards"
2024	Star Wars: Tales of the Empire	Young Morgan Elsbeth	Episode: "The Path of Fear"
2025	Your Friendly Neighborhood Spider-Man	Pearl Pangan	10 episodes

Film
Year	Title	Role	Notes
2018	Age of Sail	Lara Conrad	Short film
2020	Over the Moon	Fei Fei	Voice
2022	My Best Friend's Exorcism	Glee Tanaka	

Theater
Year	Title	Role	Notes
2017	Riot Antigone	Ismene	La MaMa Experimental Theatre Club
2017	KPOP	Jin Hee	Ars Nova, Off-Broadway
2020	Maybe Happy Ending	Claire	Alliance Theatre
2026	Maybe Happy Ending	Vacation Cover	Belasco Theatre
