= Buddha bowl =

Dish of several foods

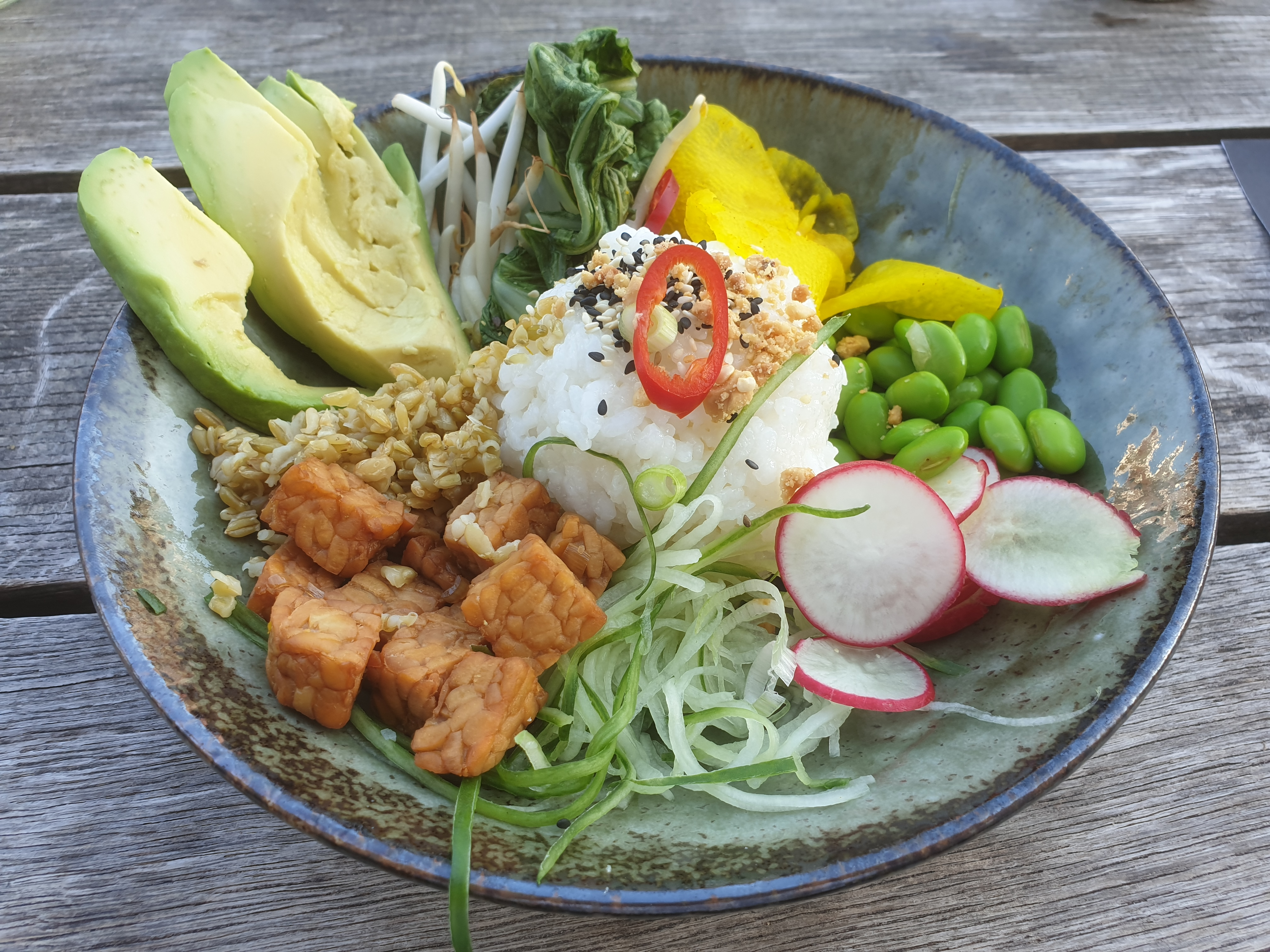
A Buddha bowl. The contents of a Buddha bowl are variable.

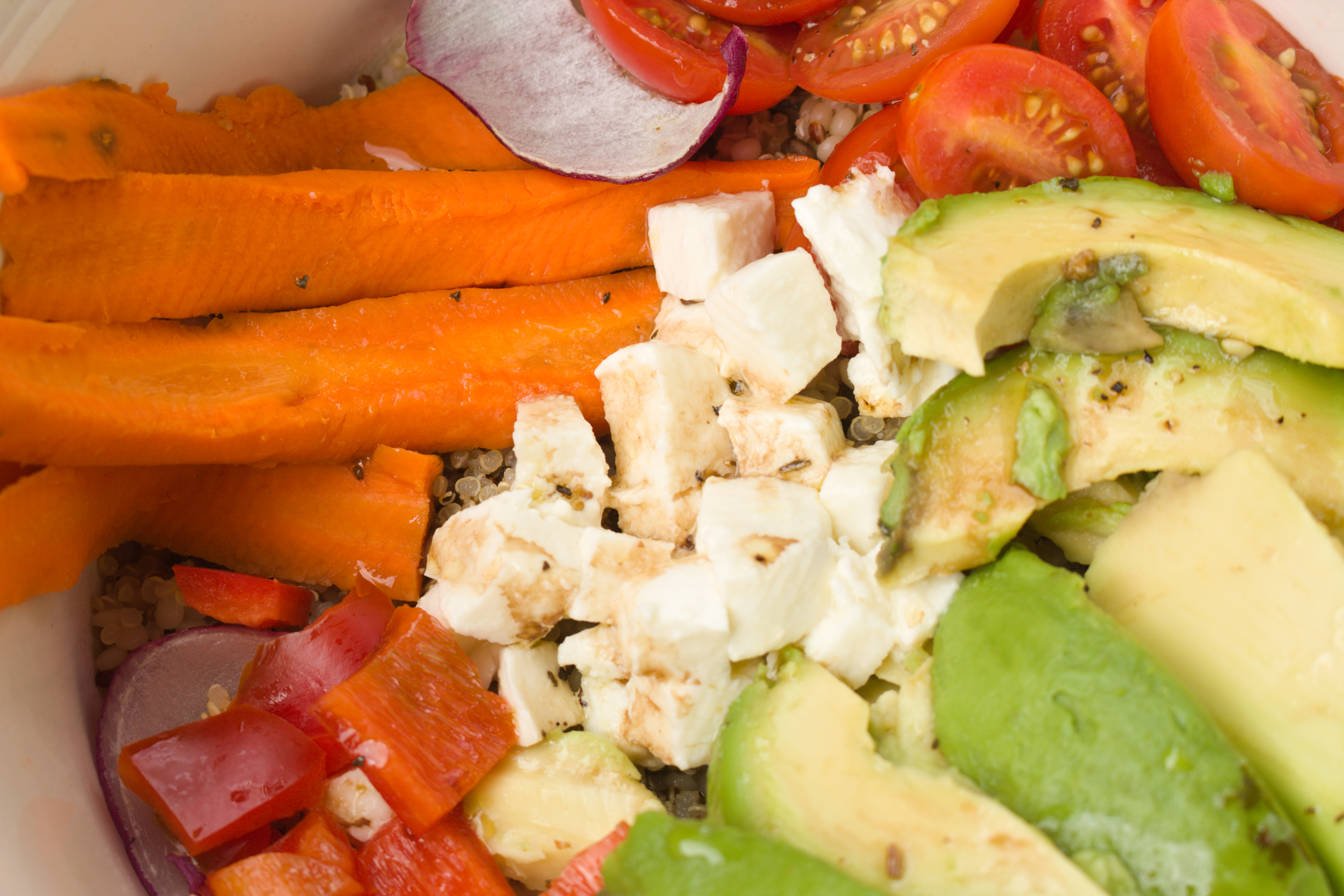
Buddha bowl (close up)

A Buddha bowl is a vegetarian meal, served in a single bowl or on a high-rimmed plate, which consists of small portions of several foods, served cold. These may include whole grains such as quinoa or brown rice, plant proteins such as chickpeas or tofu, and vegetables. The portions are not mixed on the plate nor in the bowl but arranged "artfully". Buddha bowls have been compared to nourish bowls (a non-vegetarian version) and to poké bowls (a Hawaiian raw fish dish).

There are several explanations for why the name refers to the Buddha. It may originate from presenting a balanced meal, where balance is a key Buddhist concept, from the story of Buddha carrying his food bowl to fill it with whatever bits of food villagers would offer him, or from the overstuffed bowl resembling the belly of Budai, a 10th-century Chinese monk often confused with Buddha.

== See also ==
- Cuisine of Hawaii
- Crudo
- Hoe
- Kosambari
- Khichdi (dish)
- List of hors d'oeuvre
- List of raw fish dishes
- List of vegetable dishes
- List of salads
- 'Ota 'ika
- Poke (Hawaiian dish)
- Singju
- Tataki
- Yusheng
