= Brian Oliver (producer) =

American film producer

Brian Oliver (born January 29, 1971) is an American film producer and film executive. He is the founder and CEO of New Republic Pictures and previously served as president of Cross Creek Pictures from 2009 to 2017. Oliver was nominated for an Academy Award and BAFTA Award in 2010 for Black Swan.

== Education ==
Oliver holds a bachelor's degree from UC Berkeley and a J.D. from Whittier College School of Law. While at UC Berkeley, he was an All-Conference infielder on the baseball team.

== Career ==
Oliver has produced films that include Black Swan, The Ides of March, The Woman in Black, Rush, A Walk Among the Tombstones, and Everest. He was nominated for an Academy Award for Best Picture for Black Swan at the 83rd Academy Awards and won the Best Feature Film Award at the 26th Independent Spirit Awards. Oliver has also been nominated for a Golden Globe for Black Swan, Ides of March, and Rush; a BAFTA for Black Swan; and the Producers Guild of America "Producer of the Year" in 2011 and 2012.

== Filmography ==
He was a producer in all films unless otherwise noted.

=== Film ===
Year	Film	Credit
2002	Bark!	Co-producer
2002	The Badge	Executive producer
2002	Auto Focus	
2005	Half Light	Executive producer
2009	Give 'Em Hell, Malone	
2010	Black Swan	
2011	The Ides of March	
2011	2ND Take	
2012	The Woman in Black	
2012	Arthur Newman	
2012	Aftershock	
2013	Rush	
2013	The Young and Prodigious T.S. Spivet	Executive producer
2014	A Walk Among the Tombstones	
2014	Clown	
2015	Everest	
2015	Legend	
2015	Black Mass	
2016	Pride and Prejudice and Zombies	
2016	Hacksaw Ridge	
2017	American Made	
2017	Roman J. Israel, Esq.	Executive producer
2017	Flatliners	Executive producer
2018	The Vanishing	Executive producer
2019	Rocketman	Executive producer
2019	1917	
2021	Coming 2 America	Executive producer
2021	Infinite	Executive producer
2021	Without Remorse	Executive producer
2021	The Tomorrow War	Executive producer
2021	Clifford the Big Red Dog	Executive producer
2023	Transformers: Rise of the Beasts	Executive producer

=== Television ===
Year	Title	Credit
2005	Man vs. Vegas	
2003−07	Firsthand	
