= Grady Hendrix =

American author and journalist

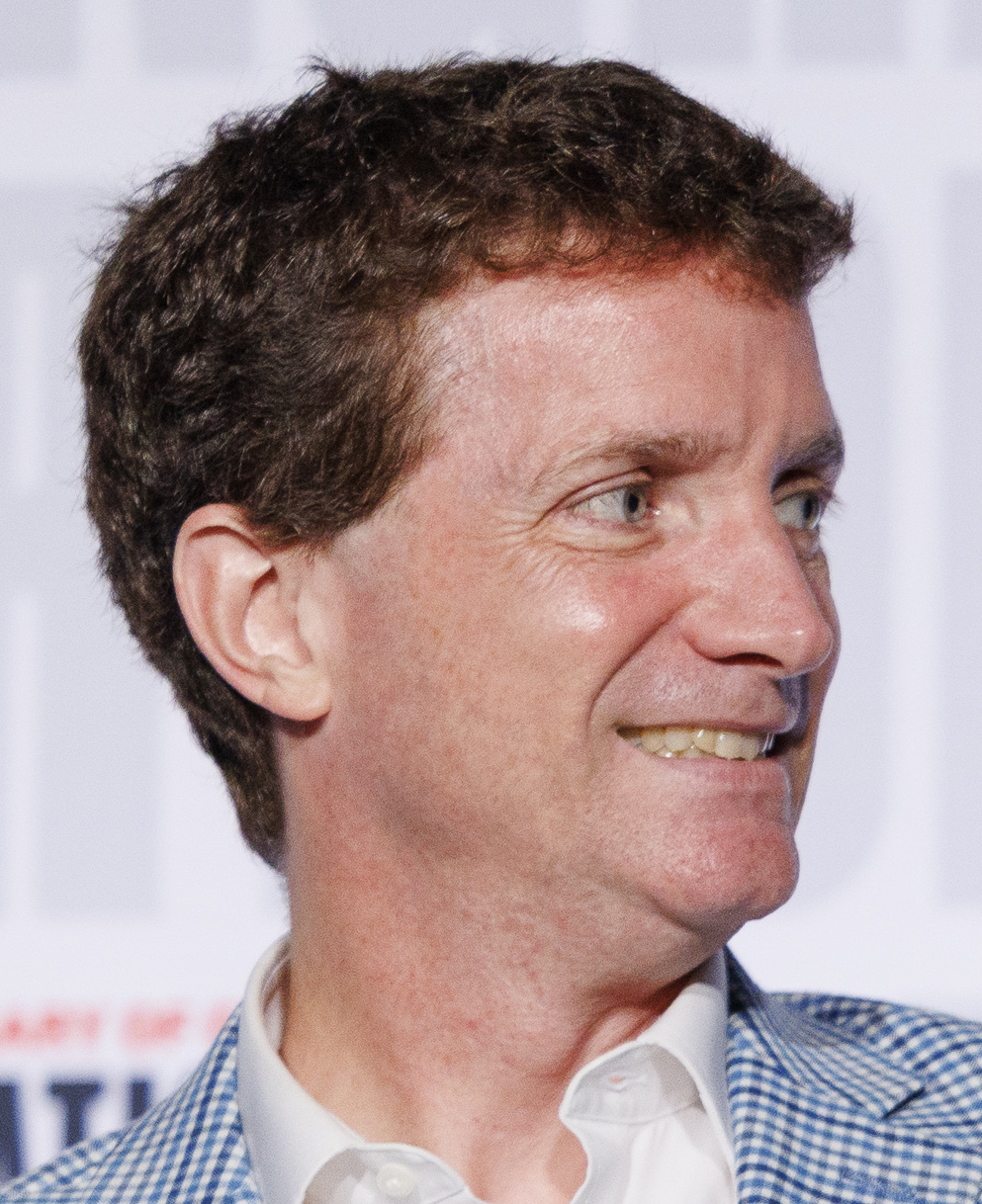
- Hendrix at the 2023 National Book Festival
- Born: Charleston, South Carolina, U.S.
- Occupations: Writer; journalist; screenwriter
- Spouse: Amanda Cohen
- Writing career
- Period: 2006–present
- Genres: Horror; fantasy; science fiction; supernatural fiction; drama; gothic; crime fiction; thriller
- Website: gradyhendrix.com

Grady Hendrix is an American author, journalist, public speaker, and screenwriter known for his best-selling 2014 novel Horrorstör. He lives in Manhattan, and is one of the founders of the New York Asian Film Festival.

== Life and career ==
Hendrix was born in South Carolina. His parents divorced when he was 13 years old, and he spent much of his time in public libraries. As an adult, he worked in the library of the American Society for Psychical Research before turning to professional writing. Alongside his novels, he has written for numerous media outlets, including Playboy magazine and the New York Post. Prior to its closure in 2008, he was a film critic for The New York Sun.

In 2009, Hendrix attended the Clarion Workshop at the University of California at San Diego.

He contributed to Katie Crouch's young adult series The Magnolia League, and his fiction has appeared in Strange Horizons and Pseudopod.

In 2012, Hendrix co-wrote Dirt Candy: A Cookbook, a graphic memoir and cookbook, with Amanda Cohen and Ryan Dunlavey.

In 2014, Quirk Books published his novel, Horrorstör, which was subsequently optioned for a television series by Fox. Grady then wrote My Best Friend's Exorcism (2016) and Paperbacks from Hell: The Twisted History of ’70s and ’80s Horror Fiction (2017). He also co-wrote the 2017 motion picture Mohawk with director Ted Geoghegan and the spec script for the horror comedy film Satanic Panic, which was acquired and produced by Fangoria mid-2018. My Best Friend's Exorcism and Horrorstör have been optioned for film adaptations, while The Southern Book Club's Guide to Slaying Vampires and The Final Girl Support Group are slated for television adaptations.

Hendrix created a one-person show for The Final Girl Support Group to promote the novel instead of traditional author events. From May 2020 to October 2020, Hendrix hosted his own podcast, Super Scary Haunted Homeschool, which discussed the history of vampires, to promote his book The Southern Book Club's Guide to Slaying Vampires.

In 2026, Hendrix published a novella with the Eden Book Society, a literary hoax created by Dead Ink Books, alongside authors Alison Rumfitt, John Darnielle, Nina Allan, Rowan Hisayo Buchanan and Chịkọdịlị Emelụmadụ. The six novellas were published pseudonymously, leaving readers to guess which author wrote which.

== Works ==
=== Novels ===
- Satan Loves You (2012)
- The White Glove War (2013, The Magnolia League #2, with Katie Crouch, Poppy)
- Horrorstör (2014, Quirk Books)
- My Best Friend's Exorcism (2016, Quirk Books)
- We Sold Our Souls (2018, Quirk Books)
- The Southern Book Club's Guide to Slaying Vampires (2020, Quirk Books)
- The Final Girl Support Group (2021, Berkley)
- How to Sell a Haunted House (2023, Berkley)
- Witchcraft for Wayward Girls (2025, Berkley)

=== Novellas ===
- BadAsstronauts (2022, Jab Books)

=== Short stories ===
- "The Bright and Shining Parasites of Guiyu" (2010, Strange Horizons)
- "Mofongo Knows" (2013, The Mad Scientist's Guide to World Domination: Original Short Fiction for the Modern Evil Genius edited byJohn Joseph Adams)

=== Short story collections ===
- Dead Leprechauns & Devil Cats: Strange Tales of the White Street Society (2020, JABberwocky Literary Agency)

=== Comics ===
- Li'l Wimmin: A Comic Adaptation of Louisa May Alcott's Little Women (2013, with Ryan Dunlavey)

=== Nonfiction books ===
- Dirt Candy: A Cookbook (2012, with Amanda Cohen and Ryan Dunlavey)
- Paperbacks from Hell: The Twisted History of ’70s and ’80s Horror Fiction (2017, Quirk Books)
- These Fists Break Bricks: How Kung Fu Movies Swept America and Changed the World (2021, Mondo Books)

=== Screenplays ===
- Mohawk (2017, with Ted Geoghegan)
- Satanic Panic (2019)
- The Black Room (TBA)
- Horrorstör (TBA)

== Awards ==
| Work | Year & Award | Category | Result | Ref. |
|---|---|---|---|---|
| Horrorstör | 2014 Foreword INDIES Awards | Horror | Silver | |
| Horrorstör | 2014 Goodreads Choice Awards | Horror | Nominated | |
| Horrorstör | 2015 RUSA CODES Reading List | Horror | Shortlisted | |
| My Best Friend's Exorcism | 2016 Goodreads Choice Awards | Horror | Nominated | |
| My Best Friend's Exorcism | 2017 RUSA CODES Reading List | Horror | Shortlisted | |
| We Sold Our Souls | 2018 Goodreads Choice Awards | Horror | Nominated | |
| We Sold Our Souls | 2018 Shirley Jackson Award | Novel | Nominated | |
| We Sold Our Souls | 2019 Dragon Awards | Horror Novel | Nominated | |
| We Sold Our Souls | 2019 Locus Award | Horror Novel | Nominated | |
| Paperbacks from Hell | 2018 Bram Stoker Award | Non-Fiction | Won | |
| Paperbacks from Hell | 2017 Goodreads Choice Awards | Non-Fiction | Nominated | |
| Paperbacks from Hell | 2018 British Fantasy Award | Non-Fiction | Nominated | |
| The Southern Book Club's Guide to Slaying Vampires | 2020 Goodreads Choice Awards | Horror | Nominated | |
| The Southern Book Club's Guide to Slaying Vampires | 2021 Lord Ruthven Award | Fiction | Won | |
| The Southern Book Club's Guide to Slaying Vampires | 2021 RUSA CODES Reading List | Horror | Shortlisted | |
| The Southern Book Club's Guide to Slaying Vampires | 2021 Locus Award | Horror Novel | Nominated | |
| The Final Girl Support Group | 2021 Goodreads Choice Awards | Horror | Won | |
| The Final Girl Support Group | 2021 Rondo Hatton Classic Horror Award | Classic Horror Fiction | Runner-up | |
| The Final Girl Support Group | 2021 Bram Stoker Award | Novel | Nominated | |
| The Final Girl Support Group | 2022 Locus Award | Horror Novel | Nominated | |
| The Final Girl Support Group | 2022 Dragon Awards | Horror Novel | Nominated | |
| How to Sell a Haunted House | 2023 Goodreads Choice Awards | Horror | Nominated | |
| How to Sell a Haunted House | 2023 Bram Stoker Award | Novel | Nominated | |
| How to Sell a Haunted House | 2024 RUSA CODES Reading List | Horror | Shortlisted | |
| How to Sell a Haunted House | 2024 Locus Award | Horror | Nominated | |
| How to Sell a Haunted House | 2024 British Fantasy Award | August Derleth Award | Nominated | |
| Witchcraft for Wayward Girls | 2025 Goodreads Choice Awards | Horror | Won | |
| Witchcraft for Wayward Girls | 2025 Bram Stoker Award | Novel | Nominated | |
| Witchcraft for Wayward Girls | 2026 British Fantasy Award | Horror Novel | Nominated | |
| — | 2021 Rondo Hatton Classic Horror Award | Writer of the Year | Runner-up | |
