= Extremely Loud & Incredibly Close (soundtrack) =

Extremely Loud and Incredibly Close (Original Motion Picture Soundtrack)

Film score by Alexandre Desplat
- Released: December 20, 2011
- Recorded: 2011
- Genre: Film score
- Length: 61:16
- Label: WaterTower Music
- Producers: Alexandre Desplat; Dominique Lemonnier

Alexandre Desplat chronology
My Week with Marilyn (2011)	Extremely Loud and Incredibly Close (2011)	Cloclo (2012)

Extremely Loud and Incredibly Close (Original Motion Picture Soundtrack) is the soundtrack to the 2011 film of the same name directed by Stephen Daldry, released by WaterTower Music on December 20, 2011. Featuring an original score composed by Alexandre Desplat and piano themes performed by Jean-Yves Thibaudet, he was brought as a replacement to the original composer Nico Muhly. The score received positive reviews from critics.

== Development ==
In September 2011, Nico Muhly was brought to score music for the film, after working with Daldry as a co-ordinator to Philip Glass, who composed for The Hours (2002), and also scored The Reader (2008). Due to creative differences, Muhly left the project and was replaced by Alexandre Desplat, the following month. Since Desplat had numerous commitments completing and The Ides of March and Carnage, and wanted to commit for Stephen Frears' Lay the Favorite (2012), he had a gap in his schedule. But when the offer came, he agreed to score for the film as he felt Daldry was a director he want to work with, leaving the commitments for Lay the Favorite to James Seymour Brett.

Desplat committed that the "story is about sorrow and loss – a child loses his father. It's a contemporary tragedy much like a Greek one that you can transpose into any period, a universal story", he felt the subject was "demanding" and had to "find emotion and sentiment in the music". Hence, he used an extremely fast piano, and also used two pianos on top of each other to heighten the emotions of the film. Desplat scored over an hour of music within three weeks.

== Track listing ==
No.	Title	Length
1.	"Extremely Loud and Incredibly Close"	1:57
2.	"The Sixth Borough"	5:06
3.	"Piano Lesson with Grandma"	1:38
4.	"The Very Best Plan"	3:27
5.	"The Worst Day"	6:08
6.	"Mother and Son"	3:38
7.	"Visiting the Blacks"	2:51
8.	"The Phone Call"	2:41
9.	"Oskar's Monologue"	2:53
10.	"Oxymorons"	2:39
11.	"The Renter's Story"	1:58
12.	"The Key"	1:55
13.	"Nothing Fits"	2:43
14.	"Listening to the Messages"	3:35
15.	"The Renter Leaves"	3:24
16.	"William Black's Story"	2:26
17.	"The Reconciliation"	3:59
18.	"The Swings of Central Park"	8:18
Total length:		61:16

== Reception ==
Brent Simon of Screen International complimented that the score from Desplat "delights in unexpectedly allusive ways". Matt Goldberg of Collider and Todd McCarthy of The Hollywood Reporter called the score as "moving" and "multi-flavored". Richard Props of The Independent Critic called it as "soaringly annoying". Scott Tobias of The A.V. Club commented "director Stephen Daldry slathers on Alexandre Desplat's prodding score—he did the same with Philip Glass in The Hours—and makes a motif out of a body falling from one of the Twin Towers. It's all very tasteful, he presumes." Andrew O'Hehir of Salon.com called the score as "minimalistic". Justin Craig of Fox News called the score as "delicate".

== Credits ==
Credits adapted from CD liner notes.

- Composer – Alexandre Desplat
- Producer – Alexandre Desplat, Dominique Lemonnier
- Programming – Lewis Morison
- Recording – Joel Iwataki, Peter Cobbin, Ryan Kelly
- Recording assistance – Halsey Quemere, Joel Sheuneman, Thorbjorn Kolbrunarson
- Mixing – Peter Cobbin
- Mixing assistance – Brett Mayer
- Mastering – Stephen Marsh
- Music editor – Gerard McCann, Nic Ratner
- Score editor – Kirsty Whalley
- Auricle operator – Tim Starnes
- Pro-tools operator – Eric Pfeifer
- Music preparation – Mark Graham
- Art direction – Sandeep Sriram
- Photography – Adriana Lopetrone

Instruments

- Bass – John Patitucci, Rachel Calin, Shawn Conley, Troy Rinker, Wan Hao Xu, Kurt Muroki
- Cello – Jerry Grossman, Mary Wooten, Maureen McDermott, Nick Canellakis, Roberta Cooper, Rupei Yeh, Wei Yu, Alan Stepansky
- Clarinet – Jim Ognibene, Lino Gomez, Pavel Vinnitsky
- Flute – Diva Goodfriend, Mindy Kaufman
- Harp – Tori Drake
- Horn – Javier Gandara, Michelle Baker, Erik Ralske
- Piano – Jean-Yves Thibaudet, Anne Marie McDermott
- Timpani – Erik Charlston
- Trumpet – David Krauss, Matt Muckey
- Viola – Alexis Sykes, Christof Huebner, Conway Kuo, Dawn Hannay, Desiree Elsevier, Junah Chung, Karen Dreyfus, Mark Holloway, Maureen Gallagher, Maurycy Banaszek, Shmuel Katz, Vivek Kamath, Robert Rinehart
- Violin – Ann Lehmann, Anna Rabinova, Annaliesa Place, Cyrus Beroukhim, Ellen Payne, Emily Popham, Eva Burmeister, Francesca Anderegg, Harumi Rhodes, Hyunju Lee, Jennifer Kim, Joanna Frankel, Jung Sun Yoo, Krzysztof Kuznik, Ming Hsin, Nate Robinson, Peter Bahng, Phil Katrandjian, Pico Alt, Ragga Petursdottir, Sein Ryu, Sharon Yamada, Sophia Kessinger, Suzanne Ornstein

Orchestra

- Orchestration – Alexandre Desplat, Jean-Pascal Beintus, Nicolas Charron, Sylvian Morizet
- Conductor – Alexandre Desplat
- Contractor – Sandra Park
- Concertmaster – Lisa E. Kim

Management

- Music business and legal affairs – Dirk Hebert
- Executive in charge of music (WaterTower Music) – Jason Linn
- Executive in charge of music (Warner Bros. Pictures) – Darren Higman, Niki Sherrod
