= List of people from Frederick, Maryland =

This is a list of people who were born in, lived in, or are closely associated with the city of Frederick, Maryland.

== Athletics ==
- Jordan Addison (born 2002), NFL wide receiver for the Minnesota Vikings
- Joe Alexander (born 1986), American-Israeli named to the 2007 All-Big East squad
- Michael Beasley (born 1989), NCAA National Player of the Year (2007–2008)
- Fred Carter (born 1945), basketball player from Mount St. Mary's University
- Chase DeLauter (born 2001), MLB outfielder for the Cleveland Guardians
- Eva Fabian (born 1993), American-Israeli world champion swimmer
- Chuck Foreman, NFL running back
- Isaiah Foster (born 2003), soccer player
- Jessie Graff, record-setting competitor on American Ninja Warrior
- Sam Hinds, MLB player for the Milwaukee Brewers
- Charlie Keller, MLB player with the New York Yankees and Detroit Tigers
- Alex Lowe (1958–1999), Alpinist considered to be the greatest alpine climber and skier of his generation
- Terence Morris (born 1979), NBA basketball player

== Arts and entertainment ==
- Scott Ambush, musician (born in Frederick)
- Lester Bowie (1941–1999), jazz trumpeter and improviser
- Mark Burrier, cartoonist and illustrator
- Joe Bussard (1936–2022), record collector
- Patsy Cline (born Virginia Patterson Hensley) (1932–1963), country music singer
- Brent Comer, actor
- David Essig, singer-songwriter, performer and record producer
- David Gallaher (born 1975), writer whose second book is set in 1950s Frederick
- Shawn Hatosy (born 1975), actor
- Francis Scott Key (1779–1843), lawyer, author of "The Star-Spangled Banner"
- Claire McCardell (1905–1958), fashion designer
- Vivienne Medrano, creator and director of Helluva Boss and Hazbin Hotel, animator, and voice actress
- William Tyler Page (1868–1942), known for his authorship of the American's Creed
- Florence Roberts (1861–1940), actress
- Bobby Steggert (born 1981), Tony Award-nominated actor
- Theophilus Thompson (1855 – after 1873), first notable African-American chess player
- Florence Trail, educator, writer
- Bryan Voltaggio, celebrity chef
- Michael Voltaggio, celebrity chef

== Military, politics, & public service ==
- Shadrach Bond (1773–1832), first governor of Illinois (born in Frederick)
- Beverly Byron, congresswoman who resided in Frederick during her time in office
- Barbara Fritchie, Unionist patriot during Civil War (1766–1862)
- John Hanson, first president of Congress under the Articles of Confederation
- Bradley Tyler Johnson (1829–1903), soldier, lawyer, and politician
- Thomas Johnson (1732–1819), jurist and political figure
- Jacob Koogle (1841–1915), Medal of Honor recipient during the American Civil War
- Charles Mathias (1922–2010), Republican member of the United States Senate, representing Maryland
- James E. McClellan (1926–2016), veterinarian and politician
- John McElroy, S.J. (1782–1877), one of the Army's first two Catholic chaplains
- Emily Nelson Ritchie McLean (1859–1916), 7th president general of the Daughters of the American Revolution
- Derrick Miller, US Army sergeant sentenced to life in prison for the premeditated murder of an Afghan civilian
- John Nelson, U.S. attorney general and congressman
- Bazabeel Norman, black Revolutionary War soldier, became the second free black landowner in Ohio
- Alexander Ogle (1766–1832), U.S. congressman
- Donald B. Rice (born 1939), secretary of the Air Force 1989–1993
- Richard P. Ross Jr. (1906–1990), general in the Marine Corps during World War II
- George Schley (1813–1890), Maryland House of Delegates and Maryland State Senate
- Winfield Scott Schley (1839–1911), rear admiral of the U.S. Navy who served from the Civil War to the Spanish–American War
- Roger Brooke Taney (1777–1864), chief justice of the Supreme Court; rendered the Dred Scott Decision in 1857
- Harold Weisberg (1913–2002), writer and public servant

== Other ==
- John Vincent Atanasoff, inventor of the modern-day computer; lived in Frederick County
- Bruce Ivins (1946–2008), scientist at Fort Detrick
- James B. Ranck Jr. (born 1930), physiologist
