= Rebecca Hall =

English actress and filmmaker (born 1982)

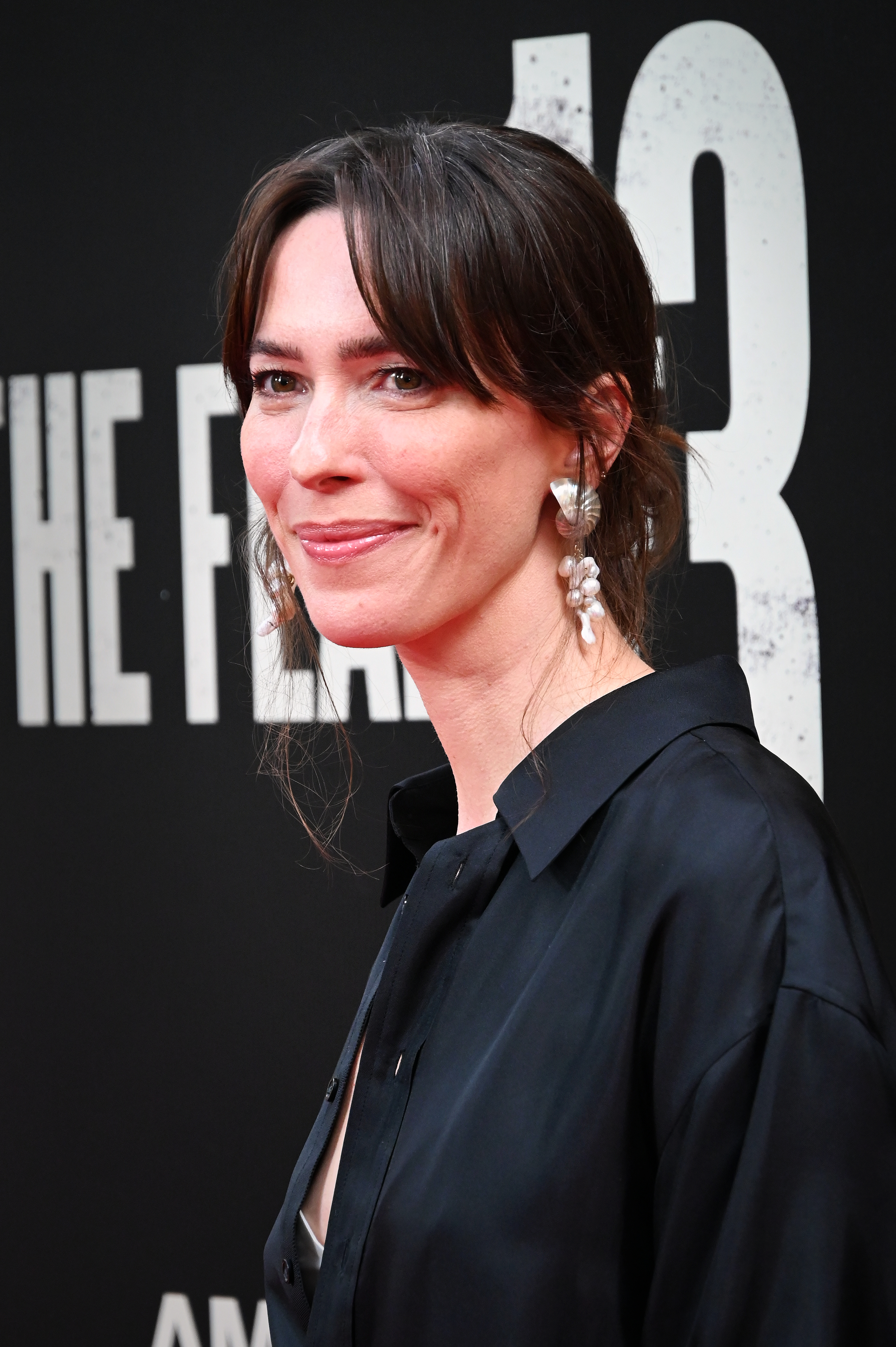
- Hall in 2026
- Born: Rebecca Maria Hall; 3 May 1982 (age 44); London, England
- Occupations: Actress; filmmaker
- Years active: 1992–present
- Spouse: Morgan Spector (m. 2015)
- Children: 1
- Parents: Sir Peter Hall; Maria Ewing
- Relatives: Edward Hall (half-brother); Christopher Hall (half-brother); Jennifer Caron Hall (half-sister)

Rebecca Maria Hall (born 3 May 1982) is an English actress and filmmaker. She made her first onscreen appearance at the age of 10 in the 1992 television adaptation of The Camomile Lawn, directed by her father, Peter Hall. Her professional stage debut came in her father's 2002 production of Mrs. Warren's Profession, which earned her an Ian Charleson Award. In 2006, following her film debut in Starter for 10, Hall got her breakthrough role in Christopher Nolan's thriller film The Prestige. She starred in Woody Allen's romantic comedy Vicky Cristina Barcelona in 2008, for which she received a Golden Globe nomination for Best Actress in a Motion Picture – Musical or Comedy.

Hall has appeared in a wide array of films, including Ron Howard's historical drama Frost/Nixon (2008), Ben Affleck's crime drama The Town (2010), the horror thriller The Awakening (2011), the Marvel Cinematic Universe film Iron Man 3 (2013), the thriller The Gift (2015), and the fantasy film The BFG (2016). In 2016, Hall was praised by critics for her portrayal of news reporter Christine Chubbuck in the biographical drama Christine. She has since starred in the Monsterverse films Godzilla vs. Kong (2021) and Godzilla x Kong: The New Empire (2024). Hall has also had several notable performances on British television. She won the British Academy Television Award for Best Supporting Actress for the 2009 Channel 4 miniseries Red Riding: 1974. In 2013, she was nominated for the British Academy Television Award for Best Actress for her performance in BBC Two's Parade's End.

In 2021, she made her feature directorial debut with the period drama Passing, which she also wrote and co-produced, adapted from Nella Larsen's 1929 novel. It received critical acclaim, and she received BAFTA nominations for Outstanding British Film and Outstanding Debut by a British Writer, Director or Producer.

== Early life and education ==
Rebecca Maria Hall was born in London on 3 May 1982, the daughter of American opera singer Maria Ewing and Sir Peter Hall, an English stage director and founder of the Royal Shakespeare Company. Her mother was born in Detroit, the daughter of an African-American mixed-race father and a Dutch mother. She is a descendant of American Revolutionary War veteran Bazabeel Norman, a free African man.

Years later, as a guest on Finding Your Roots, Hall discovered that, while her maternal grandfather, Norman Isaac Ewing, had performed as a Native American figure and was reported as a Sioux chief in newspapers, he was the son of mixed-race African-American parents, and had no Native American ancestry. His father, Hall's great-grandfather John William Ewing, had been born into slavery. After the American Civil War, he became a prominent figure in the black community of Washington, D.C. Hall has 91% European DNA and 9% sub-Saharan African DNA, according to an Ancestry.com DNA test. Hall's parents separated when she was still young, eventually divorcing in 1990. Hall has five paternal half-siblings: stage director Edward Hall, producer Christopher Hall, actresses Jennifer Caron Hall and Emma Hall, and set designer Lucy Hall. Additionally, on the April 7, 2026 episode of Finding Your Roots, it was revealed that Hall is a distant cousin of the American actress Danielle Deadwyler, who shares her date of birth.

Hall attended Roedean School, where she became head girl. She studied English literature at St Catharine's College, Cambridge, before dropping out in 2002, just before her final year. During her time at Cambridge, she was active in the student theatre scene and also set up her own theatre company. She was a member of the Marlowe Society and performed in several productions alongside her housemate Dan Stevens, an English literature student at Emmanuel College.

== Career ==
=== Film and television ===
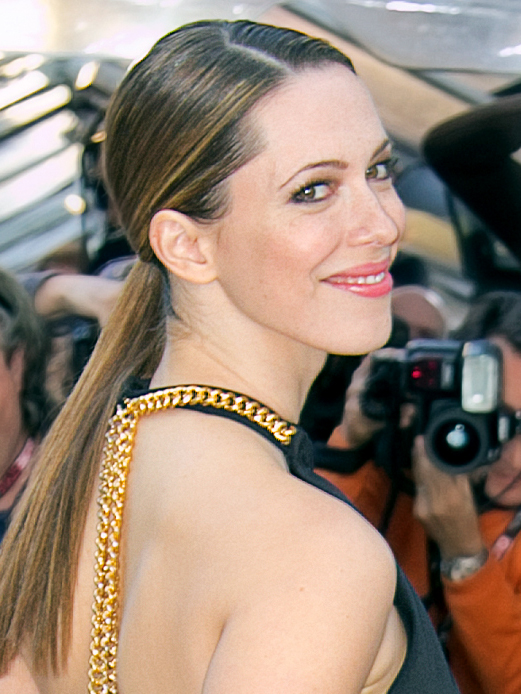
Hall at the 2011 Toronto International Film Festival

Hall's first professional role came in 1992, when at the age of nine she appeared as young Sophy in her father's television adaptation of Mary Wesley's The Camomile Lawn. Her feature film debut came in 2006 as Rebecca Epstein in the film adaptation of David Nicholls's Starter for Ten.

She got her breakthrough with the role of Sarah Borden in Christopher Nolan's film The Prestige (2006). She appeared in Stephen Poliakoff's Joe's Palace in 2007, in addition to appearing in several other television films, including Wide Sargasso Sea and Rubberheart.

Hall's Hollywood fame was sparked when she starred in the Woody Allen film Vicky Cristina Barcelona (2008) as one of the title characters, Vicky. Her performance was well received, and she was nominated for the Golden Globe Award for Best Actress – Motion Picture Musical or Comedy. Also in the same year, she appeared in Ron Howard's historical drama Frost/Nixon as the girlfriend of David Frost, played by Michael Sheen. The following year, she was cast in the British fantasy-horror film Dorian Gray, based on Oscar Wilde's 1890 novel The Picture of Dorian Gray.

Following a small role in the indie film Please Give, Hall starred in Ben Affleck's crime drama The Town (2010) opposite Affleck and Jon Hamm. In June 2010, she won the British Academy Television Award for Best Supporting Actress for her portrayal of Paula Garland in the 2009 Channel 4 production Red Riding: In the Year of Our Lord 1974. The following year, she played the female lead in the British ghost film The Awakening, released in September 2011.

In 2012, she took on the role of Beth Raymer in the comedy-drama film Lay the Favorite, based on Raymer's memoir of the same title. One review commented that she "plays Raymer as an endearing force of nature who somehow manages to survive in a dangerous world through sheer force of character". She starred in the BBC/HBO/VRT production of Parade's End (2012) opposite Benedict Cumberbatch, which earned her a BAFTA Television Award nomination for Best Actress. In 2013, Hall replaced Jessica Chastain as Maya Hansen in the superhero film Iron Man 3. The same year, she appeared in the political thriller Closed Circuit (2013). In 2014, she starred opposite Johnny Depp in Wally Pfister's directorial debut Transcendence (2014). In 2015, Hall starred in the romantic comedy Tumbledown and Joel Edgerton's directorial debut The Gift.

In the 2016 biographical drama Christine, Hall played Christine Chubbuck, a real-life TV news reporter. Her performance was praised by critics. In 2017, she portrayed Elizabeth Holloway Marston, a psychologist who inspired the character of Wonder Woman, in Professor Marston and the Wonder Women. The same year, Hall joined the cast of A Rainy Day in New York, directed by Allen. After re-reading accounts related to allegations of sexual abuse against Allen, Hall, in January 2018, donated her salary to Time's Up. She said, "I see not only how complicated this matter is, but that my actions have made another woman feel silenced and dismissed. I regret this decision and wouldn't make the same one today." However, Hall expressed regret for her apology in 2024, saying "I don’t talk to him any more, but I don’t think that [actors] should be the ones who are doing judge and jury on this."

In 2018, Hall provided English dubbing for the character Mother in Mirai. In 2021, Hall starred in and co-executive produced the well-reviewed horror-thriller The Night House. The same year, she appeared in the monster film Godzilla vs. Kong and made her directorial debut with the drama Passing, based on the 1929 American novel of the same name by Nella Larsen. Hall wrote the screenplay and co-produced the film, which was largely inspired by her own mixed-race heritage, as well as her African-American ancestors who passed as white. Passing premiered at the 2021 Sundance Film Festival and received critical acclaim. Its distribution rights were acquired by Netflix for approximately $16 million.

Hall is a signatory of the Film Workers for Palestine boycott pledge that was published in September 2025.

=== Stage ===
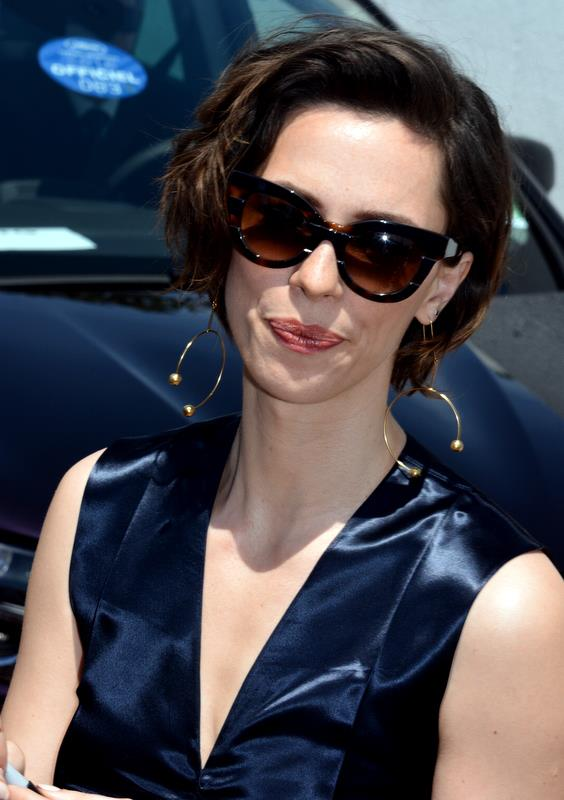
Hall at the 2016 Cannes Film Festival

Hall made her professional stage debut in 2002 when she starred as Vivie in her father's production of Mrs. Warren's Profession at the Strand Theatre in London. Her performance, described as "admirable" and "accomplished", earned her the Ian Charleson Award in 2003.

In 2003, Hall's father celebrated 50 years as a theatre director by staging a season of five plays at the Theatre Royal in Bath, Somerset. Hall starred in two of these plays; she appeared as Rosalind in her father's production of As You Like It, which gained her a second Charleson nomination and starred in the title role of Thea Sharrock's revival of D. H. Lawrence's The Fight for Barbara.

In 2004, Hall appeared in three plays for the Peter Hall Company at the Theatre Royal Bath, two of which her father directed: Man and Superman in which she played Ann, and Galileo's Daughter in which she played Sister Maria Celeste. The third, Molière's Don Juan, in which she played the part of Elvira, was directed by Sharrock.

In 2005, Hall reprised the role of Rosalind in a touring production of As You Like It, again under the direction of her father. This tour played the Rose Theatre in Kingston upon Thames, the Brooklyn Academy of Music in New York, the Curran Theatre in San Francisco and the Ahmanson Theatre in Los Angeles. This was a second leg of the US tour that began in 2003 with venues at the Shubert Theater New Haven, Connecticut, Columbus, Ohio, and the Wilbur Theater in Boston.

In 2008–2009, Hall appeared in Sam Mendes's first instalment of the Bridge Project as Hermione in The Winter's Tale and as Varya in The Cherry Orchard. The project gave performances with the same cast in Germany, Greece, New Zealand, Singapore, Spain, the United Kingdom and the United States. In 2010–2011, she played Viola in a production of Twelfth Night at London's National Theatre, directed by her father.

Hall made her Broadway debut in 2013 in Sophie Treadwell's expressionist play Machinal. The Roundabout Theater production, directed by Lyndsey Turner, began previews on 20 December 2013, with the official opening on 16 January 2014 at the American Airlines Theatre.

== Personal life ==
Hall and director Sam Mendes were in a relationship from 2011 to 2013.

In 2014, Hall met actor Morgan Spector while co-starring in a Broadway production. They married in 2015. Their daughter was born in 2018.

== Filmography ==
=== Film ===
Key
†	Denotes works that have not yet been released

Year	Title	Role	Notes
2006	Starter for 10	Rebecca Epstein	
2006	The Prestige	Sarah Borden	
2008	Vicky Cristina Barcelona	Vicky	
2008	Frost/Nixon	Caroline Cushing	
2008	Official Selection	Emily Dickinson	Short film
2009	Dorian Gray	Emily Wotton	
2010	Please Give	Rebecca	
2010	The Town	Claire Keesey	
2010	Everything Must Go	Samantha	
2011	A Bag of Hammers	Mel	
2011	The Awakening	Florence Cathcart	
2012	Lay the Favorite	Beth Raymer	
2013	Iron Man 3	Maya Hansen	
2013	Closed Circuit	Claudia Simmons-Howe	
2013	A Promise	Charlotte Hoffmeister	
2014	Transcendence	Evelyn Caster	
2015	Tumbledown	Hannah	
2015	The Gift	Robyn Callem	
2016	Christine	Christine Chubbuck	
2016	The BFG	Mary	
2017	The Dinner	Katelyn Lohman	
2017	Permission	Anna	Also producer
2017	Professor Marston and the Wonder Women	Elizabeth Holloway Marston	
2018	Mirai	Mother	Voice, English dub
2018	Teen Spirit	Jules	
2018	Holmes & Watson	Dr. Grace Hart	
2019	A Rainy Day in New York	Connie Davidoff	
2020	The Night House	Beth	Also executive producer
2021	Passing	—N/a	Director, producer and writer
2021	Godzilla vs. Kong	Ilene Andrews	
2021	With/In		Segment: "Mother!!"
2022	Resurrection	Margaret	
2022	The Listener	Laura	Voice
2024	Godzilla x Kong: The New Empire	Ilene Andrews	
2025	Peter Hujar's Day	Linda Rosenkrantz	
2025	Ella McCay	Claire McCay	
2026	The Man I Love	Brenda George	
2026	The End of It	Claire	
2026	Onslaught	Hanna Kammler	
TBA	Zero Protocol †	TBA	Post-production
TBA	A Head Full of Ghosts †	TBA	Filming

=== Television ===
Year	Title	Role	Notes
1992	The Camomile Lawn	Young Sophie	4 episodes
1993	Don't Leave Me This Way	Lizzie Neil	Television film
1994	The World of Peter Rabbit and Friends	Lucie	Voice, episode: "The Tale of Mrs. Tiggy-Winkle and Mr. Jeremy Fisher"
2006	Wide Sargasso Sea	Antoinette Cosway	Television film
2007	Rubberheart	Maggie	Short film, based on a short story by Hall
2007	Joe's Palace	Tina	Television film
2008	Einstein and Eddington	Winifred Eddington	Television film
2009	Red Riding: In the Year of Our Lord 1974	Paula Garland	Television film
2012	Parade's End	Sylvia Tietjens	5 episodes
2015	Codes of Conduct	Rebecca Rotmensen	Unaired pilot
2016	Horace and Pete	Rachel	Episode: #1.1
2020	Tales from the Loop	Loretta	6 episodes
2024	The Listeners	Claire	4 episodes
2025	The Studio	Sarah	Episode: "The Pediatric Oncologist"
2026	The Beauty	Jordan Bennett	Main cast
2026	Monster: The Lizzie Borden Story	Abby Borden	Main cast

=== Music videos ===
Year	Title	Role	Artist	Notes
2012	"A Case of You"	Girl	James Blake	

== Awards and nominations ==
Year	Association	Category	Work	Result	Ref.
2006	Empire Awards	Best Female Newcomer	The Prestige	Nominated	
2006	London Film Critics Circle Awards	British Newcomer of the Year	The Prestige	Nominated	
2008	Gotham Awards	Best Ensemble Cast	Vicky Cristina Barcelona	Won	
2008	Gotham Awards	Breakthrough Actor	Vicky Cristina Barcelona	Nominated	
2008	Golden Globe Awards	Best Actress – Motion Picture Comedy or Musical	Vicky Cristina Barcelona	Nominated	
2008	London Film Critics Circle Awards	British Actress of the Year	Vicky Cristina Barcelona	Nominated	
2008	Screen Actors Guild Awards	Outstanding Performance by a Cast in a Motion Picture	Frost/Nixon	Nominated	
2009	Drama Desk Award	Outstanding Featured Actress in a Play	The Cherry Orchard	Nominated	
2010	British Academy Television Awards	Best Supporting Actress	Red Riding: In the Year of Our Lord 1974	Won	
2010	Independent Spirit Awards	Robert Altman Award	Please Give	Won	
2010	San Diego Film Critics Society Awards	Body of Work	Please Give	Won	
2010	Evening Standard British Film Awards	Best Actress	Please Give	Nominated	
2010	Gotham Awards	Best Ensemble Cast	Please Give	Nominated	
2010	National Board of Review Awards	Best Acting by an Ensemble	The Town	Won	
2010	Broadcast Film Critics Association Awards	Best Acting Ensemble	The Town	Nominated	
2010	Washington D.C. Area Film Critics Association Awards	Best Acting Ensemble	The Town	Won	
2011	British Independent Film Awards	Best Actress	The Awakening	Nominated	
2013	British Academy Television Awards	Best Actress	Parade's End	Nominated	
2013	Satellite Awards	Best Actress – Miniseries or Television Film	Parade's End	Nominated	
2013	Critics' Choice Television Awards	Best Actress in a Movie/Miniseries	Parade's End	Nominated	
2014	Outer Critics Circle Award	Best Actress in a Play	Machinal	Nominated	
2016	Chicago International Film Festival	Silver Hugo Award for Best Actress	Christine	Won	
2016	Chicago Film Critics Association Awards	Best Actress	Christine	Nominated	
2016	Detroit Film Critics Society Awards	Best Actress	Christine	Nominated	
2016	Houston Film Critics Society Awards	Best Actress	Christine	Nominated	
2016	IndieWire Critics Poll	Best Actress	Christine	Nominated	
2016	London Film Critics' Circle Awards	British Actress of the Year	Christine	Nominated	
2016	Los Angeles Film Critics Association Awards	Best Actress	Christine	Nominated	
2016	Toronto Film Critics Association Awards	Best Actress	Christine	Nominated	
2016	Women Film Critics Circle Awards	Best Actress	Christine	Nominated	
2016	Women Film Critics Circle Awards	Courage in Acting Award	Christine	Won	
2016	Women Film Critics Circle Awards	The Invisible Woman Award	Christine	Nominated	
2018	Drama League Award	Distinguished Performance Award	Animal	Nominated	
2021	Gotham Independent Film Awards	Best Feature	Passing	Nominated	
2021	Gotham Independent Film Awards	Bingham Ray Breakthrough Director Award	Passing	Nominated	
2021	Gotham Independent Film Awards	Best Screenplay	Passing	Nominated	
2021	Chicago Film Critics Association	Breakthrough Filmmaker	Passing	Nominated	
2022	Alliance of Women Film Journalists	Best Film	Passing	Nominated	
2022	Alliance of Women Film Journalists	Best Director	Passing	Nominated	
2022	Alliance of Women Film Journalists	Best Writing, Adapted Screenplay	Passing	Nominated	
2022	Alliance of Women Film Journalists	Best Woman Director	Passing	Nominated	
2022	Alliance of Women Film Journalists	Best Woman Screenwriter	Passing	Nominated	
2022	Austin Film Critics Association	Best First Film	Passing	Nominated	
2022	Black Reel Awards	Outstanding Motion Picture	Passing	Nominated	
2022	Black Reel Awards	Outstanding Director	Passing	Nominated	
2022	Black Reel Awards	Outstanding Screenplay	Passing	Won	
2022	Black Reel Awards	Outstanding Emerging Director	Passing	Nominated	
2022	Black Reel Awards	Outstanding First Screenplay	Passing	Won	
2022	Camerimage	Golden Frog Directors' Debuts	Passing	Nominated	
2022	Directors Guild of America Awards	First-Time Feature Film	Passing	Nominated	
2022	Hollywood Critics Association Film Awards	Best Director	Passing	Nominated	
2022	Hollywood Critics Association Film Awards	Best Adapted Screenplay	Passing	Nominated	
2022	Hollywood Critics Association Film Awards	Best First Feature	Passing	Nominated	
2022	London Film Critics Circle Awards	Breakthrough British/Irish Filmmaker of the Year	Passing	Won	
2022	New York Film Critics Online	Best Director Debut	Passing	Won	
2022	Online Film Critics Society Awards	Best Debut Feature	Passing	Nominated	
2022	Online Film Critics Society Awards	Best Adapted Screenplay	Passing	Nominated	
2022	San Diego Film Critics Society	Best Adapted Screenplay	Passing	Nominated	
2022	San Francisco Bay Area Film Critics Circle	Best Adapted Screenplay	Passing	Nominated	
2022	Satellite Awards	Best Adapted Screenplay	Passing	Nominated	
2022	Toronto Film Critics Association	Best First Feature	Passing	Nominated	
2022	NAACP Image Awards	Outstanding Breakthrough Creative in a Motion Picture	Passing	Nominated	
2022	BAFTA Awards	Outstanding British Film	Passing	Nominated	
2022	BAFTA Awards	Outstanding Debut by a British Writer, Director or Producer	Passing	Nominated	
