= Beth Raymer =

American writer

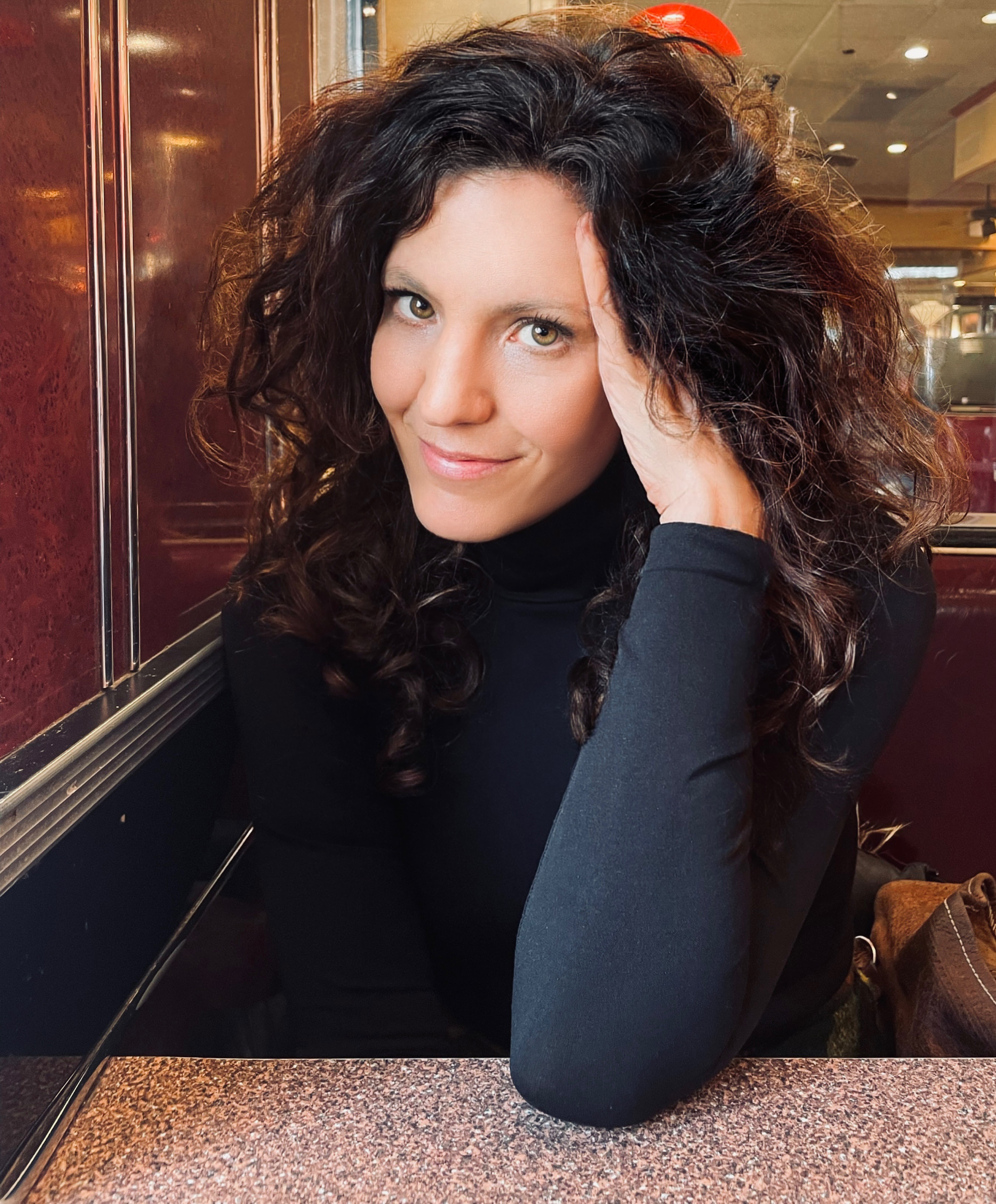
- Born: 1976 (age 49–50); Steubenville, Ohio, U.S.
- Education: Florida State University; Columbia University
- Occupations: Writer; journalist; screenwriter
- Writing career
- Genres: Memoir, fiction
- Subjects: Subcultures, class, family dynamics, gambling

Beth Anne Raymer (born in 1976 in Steubenville, Ohio) is an American writer and journalist. Her work in both fiction and non-fiction explores subcultures and issues relevant to the lives of lower and middle-class families. Raymer received an MFA from Columbia University. As a Fulbright fellow, she studied offshore gambling operations in Costa Rica, Nicaragua and Panama. Raymer is the author of several books including Lay the Favorite, a memoir of her experience in the sports-betting industry. The memoir was adapted into a film in 2012. Her journalism has been published in The Atlantic, Lapham’s Quarterly, Sports Illustrated, and The New York Times Magazine.

== Education and early life ==
Raymer was born in Steubenville, Ohio in 1976 and grew up in West Palm Beach, Florida, where she attended Palm Beach Community College. Her work often draws on her challenging childhood and the struggle of maintaining a relationship with her homeless father.

Raymer attended Florida State University, graduating with a B.A. in social work. As a student, she worked as an "in-home stripper" and later modeled for adult websites. After being fired from a social work job Raymer moved to Las Vegas at the age of 24 and found work in the world of high-stakes gambling and bookmaking. She received an MFA in Nonfiction Writing from Columbia University in 2008.

== Books and screenplays ==
=== Lay the Favorite ===
Raymer's book, Lay the Favorite, was published in 2010. It follows Raymer as she navigates the legal and illegal world of sports gambling. It has been described as a "tragicomic biography" and a "Dickensian picaresque that paints an entertaining view of sports gambling and her own unconventional character."

In 2007, Focus Features and Random House Films acquired the rights to produce a movie adaptation of the book. Stephen Frears directed the movie, also called Lay the Favorite, which premiered at the 2012 Sundance Film Festival. Rebecca Hall plays Raymer, starring alongside Bruce Willis, Catherine Zeta-Jones and Vince Vaughn.

=== Fireworks Every Night ===
Raymer's debut novel Fireworks Every Night, Random House (summer, 2023), explores class differences, the lasting effects of childhood dysfunction, and complex family bonds.

=== The Lingerie Show ===
Raymer is the writer and narrator of the short film The Lingerie Show, 2015. This film about addiction, loss, and a new start, debuted at the New York Film Festival and was an official selection of the Ottawa International Animation Festival, Melbourne International Animation Festival, Madrid International Film Festival, the Chicago Underground Film Festival, and the Los Angeles Film Festival.

=== Head of Household: A Journal for Single Moms ===
Head of Household: A Journal for Single Moms, Princeton Architectural Press, May, 2023

=== Nuclear: Family and its Aftermath ===
Nuclear: Family and its Aftermath, Random House, Spring, 2025. This book explores the diverging destinies of two sisters growing up in poverty in 1980s Florida.

== Awards ==
- Yaddo Fellow, 2016, 2019
- MacDowell Fellow, 2010, 2013
- Jack Kerouac Writer-in-Residence, 2011
- Florida Arts Council Grant Recipient, 2009
- Fulbright Fellow, 2009
- Hertog Fellow at Columbia University, 2007 - 2008
