= Maria Ewing =

American opera singer (1950–2022)

Maria Ewing, Lady Hall
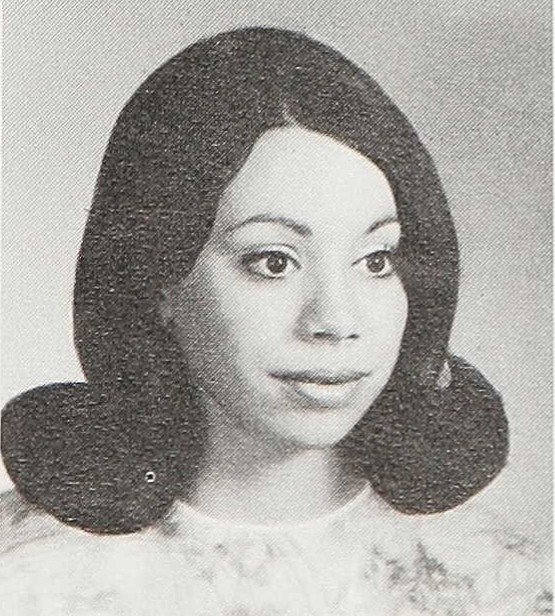
- Ewing in 1968
- Born: March 27, 1950; Detroit, Michigan, U.S.
- Died: January 9, 2022 (aged 71); Detroit, Michigan, U.S.
- Education: Cleveland Institute of Music
- Occupation: Opera singer
- Spouse: Peter Hall (m. 1982; div. 1990)
- Children: Rebecca Hall
- Relatives: Bazabeel Norman (great-great-great grandfather)

Maria Louise Ewing, Lady Hall (March 27, 1950 – January 9, 2022) was an American opera singer. In the early part of her career she performed solely as a lyric mezzo-soprano; she later assumed full soprano parts as well. Her signature roles were Blanche, Carmen, Dorabella, Rosina and Salome. Some critics regarded her as one of the most compelling singing actresses of her generation.

== Early life and education ==
Maria Louise Ewing was born in Detroit, Michigan, on March 27, 1950. She was the youngest of four daughters of Hermina Ewing, née Veraar, a Dutch-born homemaker, and Norman Isaac Ewing, an electrical engineer at a steel company. Her father claimed to be of Sioux descent, but he was the son of parents who were each mixed-race, part European and part African.

An episode of the genealogical television show Finding Your Roots devoted to Ewing's daughter, the actress Rebecca Hall, revealed that Norman was the son of John William Ewing, born into slavery, and as an adult a prominent figure in the African-American community of Washington, DC. He was a descendant of Bazabeel Norman, a notable Black veteran of the American Revolutionary War.

(Rebecca Hall's interest in her mother's ethnicity inspired her to make a film, Passing, adapted from a 1920s novel by Nella Larsen. The two African-American women protagonists are each of mixed race, but one has chosen to pass as white and has a white husband who does not know of her African ancestry.) According to Ewing's former husband, her father's African roots caused her family so much anxiety that a particularly dark-skinned relative of theirs was forbidden from visiting their home during the hours of daylight. Ewing was unembarrassed by her racial make-up, regarding her African roots not with shame but with pride.

Ewing's parents were both musical enthusiasts: her mother was a keen collector of classical recordings, and her father played the piano well enough to attract an audience of admiring neighbors. Ewing's own musical education began with piano lessons when she was thirteen. As well as playing solo piano pieces, she sometimes acted as an accompanist for one of her sisters, Frances, occasionally singing duets with her; their mother was sufficiently impressed by her voice to encourage her to complement her keyboard work by studying singing too. Coached by a local voice teacher, Ewing joined the alto section of the chorus at her Detroit high school—Jared W. Finney High School—and was soon participating in and winning singing competitions.

When she was seventeen, she became a pupil of Marjorie Gordon, a coloratura soprano (not to be confused with an English Gilbert and Sullivan soprano of the same name). After only a year of teaching Ewing, Gordon suggested that she should apply to take part in Oakland University's Meadow Brook Music Festival. She auditioned for the role of Maddalena in a production of Rigoletto that was to be conducted by a young James Levine. Their meeting proved to be wonderfully serendipitous: Levine was so struck by her expressive power that he assured her that she had the potential to become a major artist. For her part, she found in him a teacher, mentor, guide, champion and friend. In order to study with Levine, she sought and won a scholarship at the Cleveland Institute of Music, where her other instructors included soprano Eleanor Steber. After she graduated in 1970, Levine urged her to continue her training in New York City as a private pupil of the great mezzo-soprano Jennie Tourel. Ewing supported herself by working in offices and clothing stores.

== Career ==
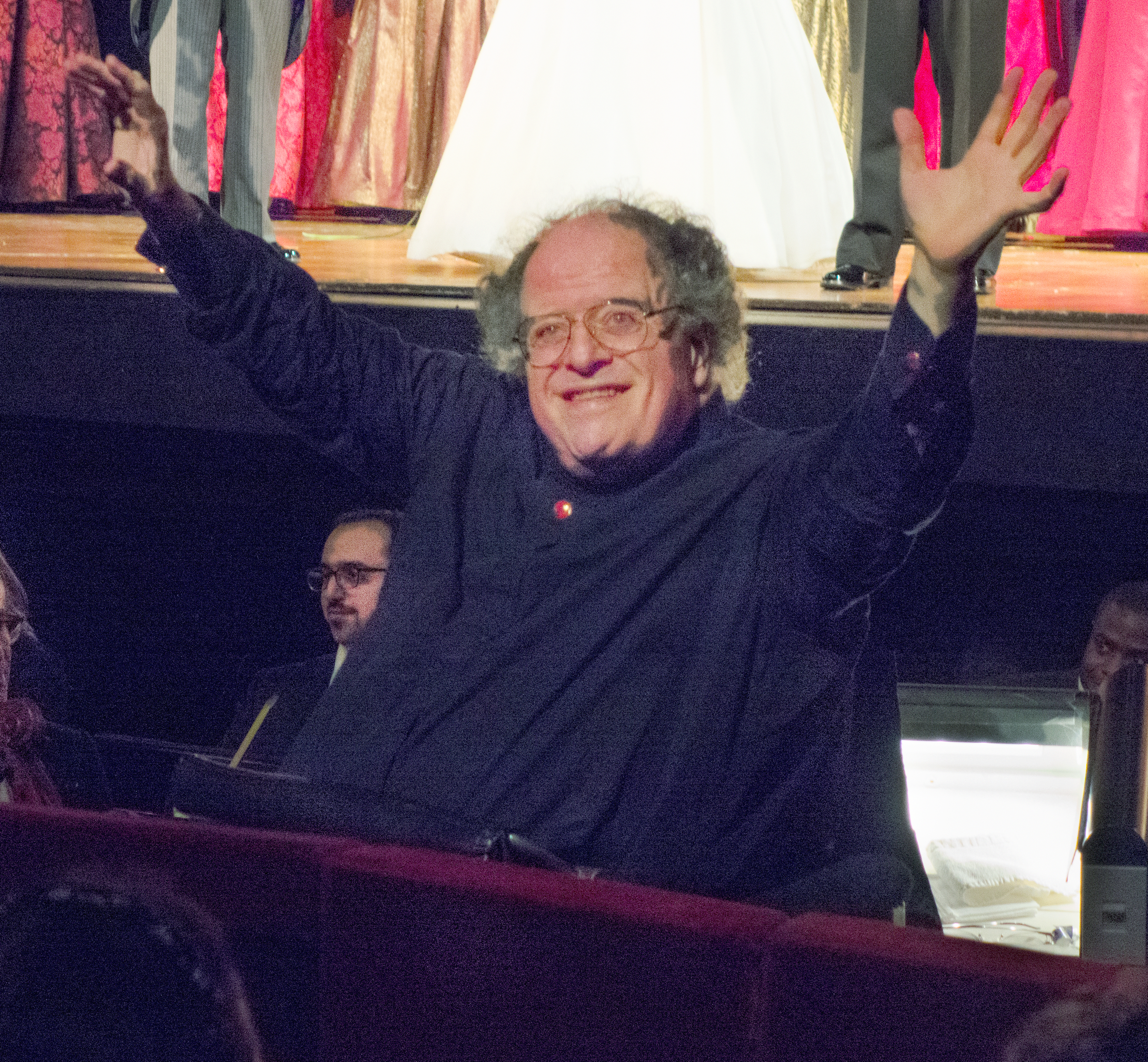
James Levine in 2013

Ewing began her professional life as a lyric mezzo-soprano. Her debut was as Rosina in an English-language production of Il barbiere di Siviglia in Detroit in 1970, staged by a company now known as the Michigan Opera Theatre. (She returned to the role many times, including at Houston Grand Opera in 1976 and 1983, at Glyndebourne Festival Opera in 1981 and 1982 and at the Metropolitan Opera in 1982.) After three years of gradually building a career as a recitalist, concert artist and opera performer, she made her first appearance at a high-profile venue on June 29, 1973, when she starred at the Ravinia Festival singing a program of songs by Alban Berg accompanied by the Chicago Symphony Orchestra and conducted by Levine. "I cannot remember a young singer who has excited me more on a first hearing", wrote the Chicago Tribune's Thomas Willis. "Still in her early twenties, she has the clear stamp of greatness in every movement and tone".

The first leading opera company that engaged Ewing was San Francisco's. She was their Mercédès in Carmen in 1973, and their Sicle in Francesco Cavalli's Ormindo in 1974. In 1975, Santa Fe Opera presented her in Così fan tutte as Dorabella, one of the parts with which she became most closely associated: she was highly praised in the role both at Glyndebourne in 1978 and at the Metropolitan Opera, with Levine on the podium, in 1982. In his history of Glyndebourne, Spike Hughes remembered Ewing's Dorabella as "a particular joy, with a natural gift of timing and an enchantingly comical face", while for Levine, Ewing was "the funniest, most stylish Dorabella you could imagine, absolutely sensational".

It was as Cherubino in Le nozze di Figaro that Ewing first appeared in Europe, playing the farfallone amoroso at Salzburg in 1976; she repeated the role there in 1979 and 1980. It was as Cherubino too that she first sang at the Metropolitan Opera on October 14, 1976, in a production to which she returned in 1977. In his autobiography, the director Lotfi Mansouri remembered Ewing at this stage in her career as "an alluring mezzo who could convince audiences possibly better than anyone else that her enchantingly sung Cherubino was really a boy". She offered another Mozart trousers role in 1977, when she sang Idamante in his opera seria Idomeneo at the San Francisco Opera. In 1980 and 1984, she appeared in his second da Ponte work when she was Zerlina in Don Giovanni at the Geneva Opera and the Met respectively. Her other bel canto mezzo-soprano role was Angelina in La Cenerentola (Houston Grand Opera, 1979; Geneva Opera, 1981).

As Ewing's career in opera progressed, her choice of parts became ever more eclectic, spanning the gamut from seventeenth century works by Monteverdi and Purcell to twentieth century pieces by Shostakovich and Poulenc. Ultimately she went so far as to adventure beyond the boundaries of her mezzo Fach and sing as a soprano too. Among the parts that she assumed were the title role in La Périchole (San Francisco Opera, 1976; Geneva Opera, 1982 and 1983); Blanche in Dialogues des Carmélites (Metropolitan Opera, 1977, 1978, 1979, 1980, 1981 and 1987); Mélisande in Pelléas et Mélisande (La Scala, 1977; San Francisco Opera, 1979); Charlotte in Werther (San Francisco Opera, 1978); the Composer in Ariadne auf Naxos (Glyndebourne Festival Opera, 1981; Metropolitan Opera, 1984 and 1985); Susanna in Le nozze di Figaro (Geneva Opera, 1983; Lyric Opera of Chicago, 1987); Poppea in L'incoronazione di Poppea (Glyndebourne Festival Opera, 1984 and 1986); the title roles in Carmen (Glyndebourne Festival Opera, 1985 and 1987; Metropolitan Opera, 1986; Royal Opera House, 1991), Salome (Los Angeles Opera, 1986; Royal Opera House, 1988; Lyric Opera of Chicago, 1988; San Francisco Opera, 1993), Die lustige Witwe (Lyric Opera of Chicago, 1986 and 1987), Tosca (Royal Opera House, 1991) and Madama Butterfly (Los Angeles Opera, 1991); Didon in Les Troyens (Metropolitan Opera, 1993 and 1994); Katerina Ismailova in Lady Macbeth of Mtsensk (Metropolitan Opera, 1994); Dido in Dido and Aeneas (Hampton Court, 1995); Marie in Wozzeck (Metropolitan Opera, 1997); the title role in Fedora (Los Angeles Opera, 1997); and the Queen of the Fairies in Iolanthe (Gielgud Theatre, London, 2008). It was for her performance in Salome that she attracted the warmest plaudits, not least for the succès de scandale that she achieved in the opera's notorious Dance of the Seven Veils. At Los Angeles in 1986, she ended Salome's strip-tease with her modesty protected by a gold lamé G-string, but at Covent Garden two years later, she dispensed with even that minimal concession to prudery and became one of the few opera singers to dare full-frontal nudity. "I felt the G-string was vulgar," she said. *I think the nudity is more pure. It's a mixture of purity and decadence, that's what's so fascinating."

The non-operatic music that Ewing performed was as diverse as her theatrical repertoire: it included Berg's Sieben Frühe Lieder, Berlioz's La damnation de Faust, Debussy's La damoiselle élue and Trois ballades de François Villon, Mozart's Great Mass in C minor and Verdi's Quattro pezzi sacri. She could be as dramatic in concert as when performing as a singing actress—the conductor Simon Rattle recalled her interpretation of Ravel's Shéhérazade as "easily the most X-rated Shéhérazade you can imagine". Her recital repertoire extended from an aria by Handel to art songs by Debussy, Duparc, Schubert and Wolf. As regards genres of music outside the classical realm, she had an especial affection for jazz ever since being introduced to it by Dave Brubeck's Take Five at the age of eight; she sometimes spent an entire night compulsively listening to one jazz record after another. During the BBC Proms festival of 1989 she performed cabaret numbers with Richard Rodney Bennett, and her videography includes a DVD of her performing with the band Kymaera at Ronnie Scott's Jazz Club in London.

== Personal life ==
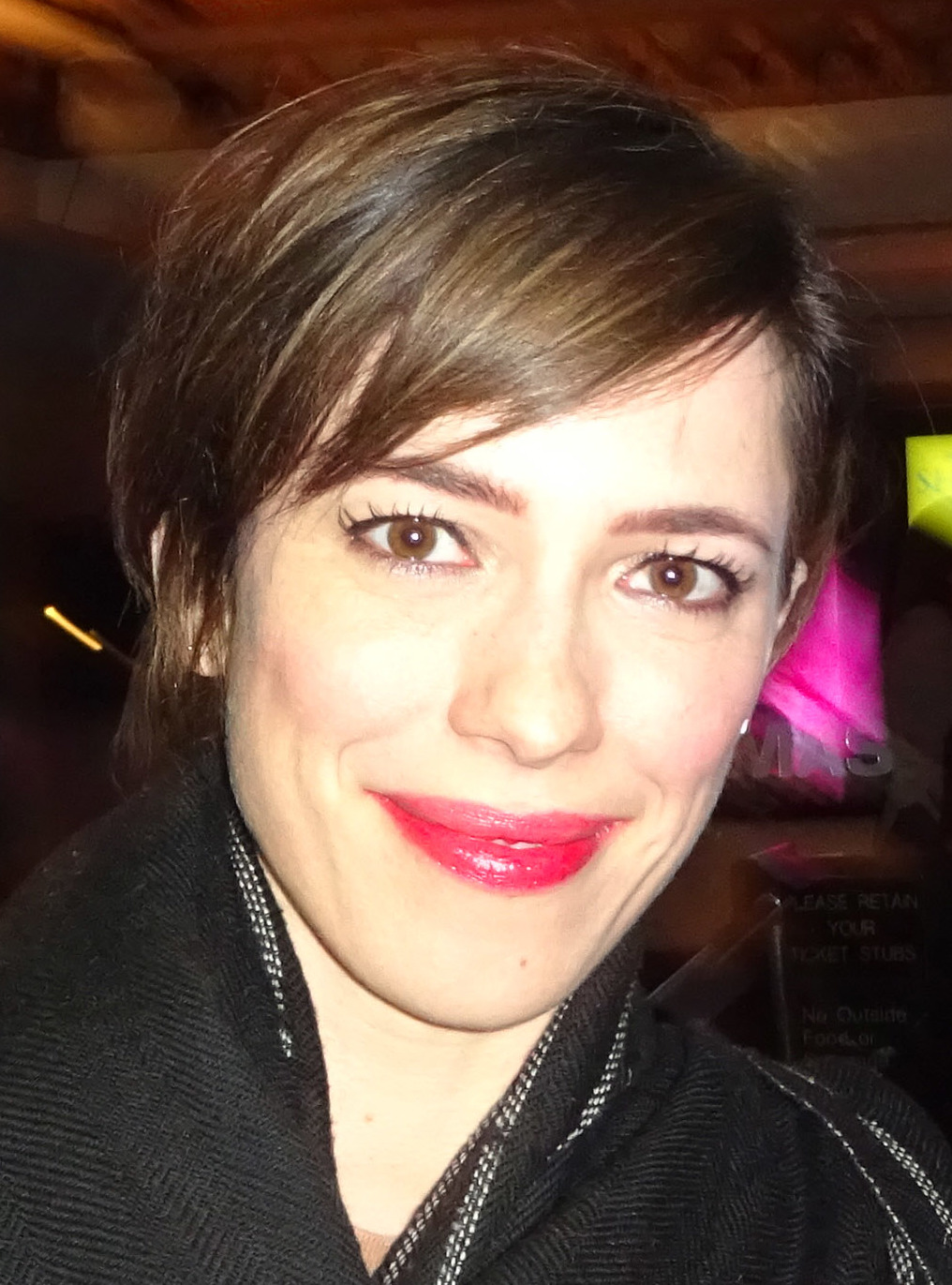
Ewing's daughter, Rebecca Hall, photographed in 2016

Ewing's relationship with the English director Sir Peter Hall began when they worked together in a production of Così fan tutte at Glyndebourne in 1978. He found her "delightful, provocative and very, very attractive; formidable too, but wonderfully funny". For her, "it was a meeting of minds and sympathies". "We played piano duets", Hall recalled, "and found that we both hated the dead conventions, the laziness and the silliness of much opera production". When Hall visited her in New York the following year, their friendship metamorphosed into romance: "I am deeply in love with Maria Ewing", he confided to his diary on Christmas Day. "We plan to make our life together in the new year when she will come to London". They married on Long Island on Valentine's Day, 1982. Their only child, Rebecca – who grew up to become a successful actress – was born three months later. Hall described his time with Ewing as "years of passion, of highs and lows, excitements and despair". "Her blazing integrity and refusal to compromise do not make her an easy person to live with", he wrote. "The mixture of our two volatile natures and our two careers... made for a turbulent life, sometimes gloriously happy, sometimes acutely miserable". They separated in 1988 and Hall began a relationship with Nicki Frei, a press officer at London's National Theatre.

Hall and Ewing were divorced in 1990. Ewing never remarried, but in her later years she had a platonic relationship with Amir Hosseinpour, a Tehran-born director and choreographer.

In 2003, Ewing lived in Sussex, England.

== Reputation ==
Opinions of Ewing were extremely diverse. Lotfi Mansouri thought her "highly gifted", but described her conduct in San Francisco Opera's 1993 production of Salome as "a nightmare...She became difficult, stubborn, and wrongheaded. In the easier sections, she would drag the rhythms, then rush like crazy in the more difficult parts... Married to Sir Peter Hall at the time, she expected to be addressed as 'Lady Hall', then put a sign on her dressing room saying that she was not to be spoken to at all". The critic and musical historian Peter G. Davis condemned her 1986 Metropolitan Opera Carmen as "a loopy Gypsy who might have just landed from the moon as she lurched spastically from one scene to the next without allure, consistency, credibility, or vocal distinction. That Ewing continued to be taken seriously over the next decade in the face of ongoing vocal collapse, whooping and scooping through one part after another, only indicated how decadent the Farrar-Garden tradition had become".

On the other hand, Simon Rattle praised her as "the most interesting singing actress of the stage". Despite a six-year hiatus in their friendship when he broke a promise to cast her in a new production of Carmen at the Met, James Levine never ceased to admire her: "She had the whole gift: brilliant on the stage, brilliant musician, brilliant linguist, very striking timbre. Maria started off with maybe the most full-scale and versatile gifts of any artist I ever worked with, able to sing every language, every style, recital, oratorio, opera, the whole business".

Peter Hall too always remained as enthusiastic about Ewing's art as he was when he first collaborated with her. "Her whole being is about performing, and truthful performing. She can only work with complete commitment and honesty... Her performances are incandescent. Even if you don't like them you cannot ignore them... Some people cannot take her highly personal approach; they say she pulls the music about, remaking it in her own image. This is not true; she is a meticulous musician. But her need to express leads her to emphasise and inflect outside the well-bred norm...She is a disturbing performer, a star". "She is not a well-mannered artist and does not live her life calmly. I love her for that."

== Death ==
Ewing died of cancer at her residence near Detroit on January 9, 2022, at the age of 71.

== Recordings ==
=== Videography ===
- Bizet: Carmen, Covent Garden; d. Nuria Espert, c. Zubin Mehta; Arthaus DVD
- Bizet: Carmen, Earls Court; d. Steven Pimlott, c. Jacques Delacôte; Image Entertainment DVD
- Bizet: Carmen, Glyndebourne; d. Peter Hall, c. Bernard Haitink; Kultur DVD
- Gustav Mahler: Symphony No. 4; Concertgebouw Orchestra, c. Bernard Haitink; Arthaus DVD
- Monteverdi: L'incoronazione di Poppea, Glyndebourne; d. Peter Hall, c. Raymond Leppard; Kultur DVD
- Mozart: Le nozze di Figaro, Vienna Philharmonic Orchestra; d. Jean-Pierre Ponnelle, c. Karl Böhm; Deutsche Grammophon DVD
- Mozart: Requiem; Bavarian Radio Symphony Orchestra, c. Leonard Bernstein; Deutsche Grammophon DVD
- Purcell: Dido and Aeneas, Hampton Court; d. Peter Maniura, c. Richard Hickox; Kultur DVD
- Rossini: Il barbiere di Siviglia, Glyndebourne; d. John Cox, c. Sylvain Cambreling; Kultur DVD
- Richard Strauss: Salome, Covent Garden; d. Peter Hall, c. Edward Downes; Pioneer DVD
- Various: Maria Ewing with Kymaera, live at Ronny Scott's; String Jazz Productions DVD

=== Discography ===
- Berlioz: La damnation de Faust; Frankfurt Radio Symphony, c. Eliahu Inbal; Brilliant Classics CD
- Debussy: La damoiselle élue; London Symphony Orchestra, c. Claudio Abbado; Deutsche Grammophon CD
- Debussy: Pelléas et Mélisande; Vienna Philharmonic Orchestra, c. Claudio Abbado; Deutsche Grammophon CD
- Mozart: Don Giovanni; London Philharmonic Orchestra, c. Bernard Haitink; EMI Classics CD
- Mozart: Requiem; Bavarian Radio Symphony Orchestra, c. Leonard Bernstein; Deutsche Grammophon CD
- Purcell: Dido and Aeneas; Collegium Musicum 90, c. Richard Hickox; Chaconne CD
- Ravel: Shéhérazade; City of Birmingham Symphony Orchestra, c. Simon Rattle; EMI Classics CD
- Richard Rodgers: Rodgers and Hammerstein at the Movies; John Wilson Orchestra, c. John Wilson; EMI Classics CD
- Shostakovich: Lady Macbeth of Mtsensk; Orchestre de l'Opéra Bastille, c. Myung-Whun Chung; Deutsche Grammophon CD
- Various: From this moment on; Royal Philharmonic Orchestra, c. Neil Richardson; IMP Masters CD
- Various: Simply Maria; BBC CD
