= Wide Sargasso Sea (2006 film) =

- Starring: Rafe Spall; Rebecca Hall; Nina Sosanya; Victoria Hamilton
- Country of origin: United Kingdom
- No. of episodes: 1

Production
- Producer: Kudos Film & Television
- Running time: 90 minutes

Original release
- Network: BBC Four
- Release: 9 October 2006

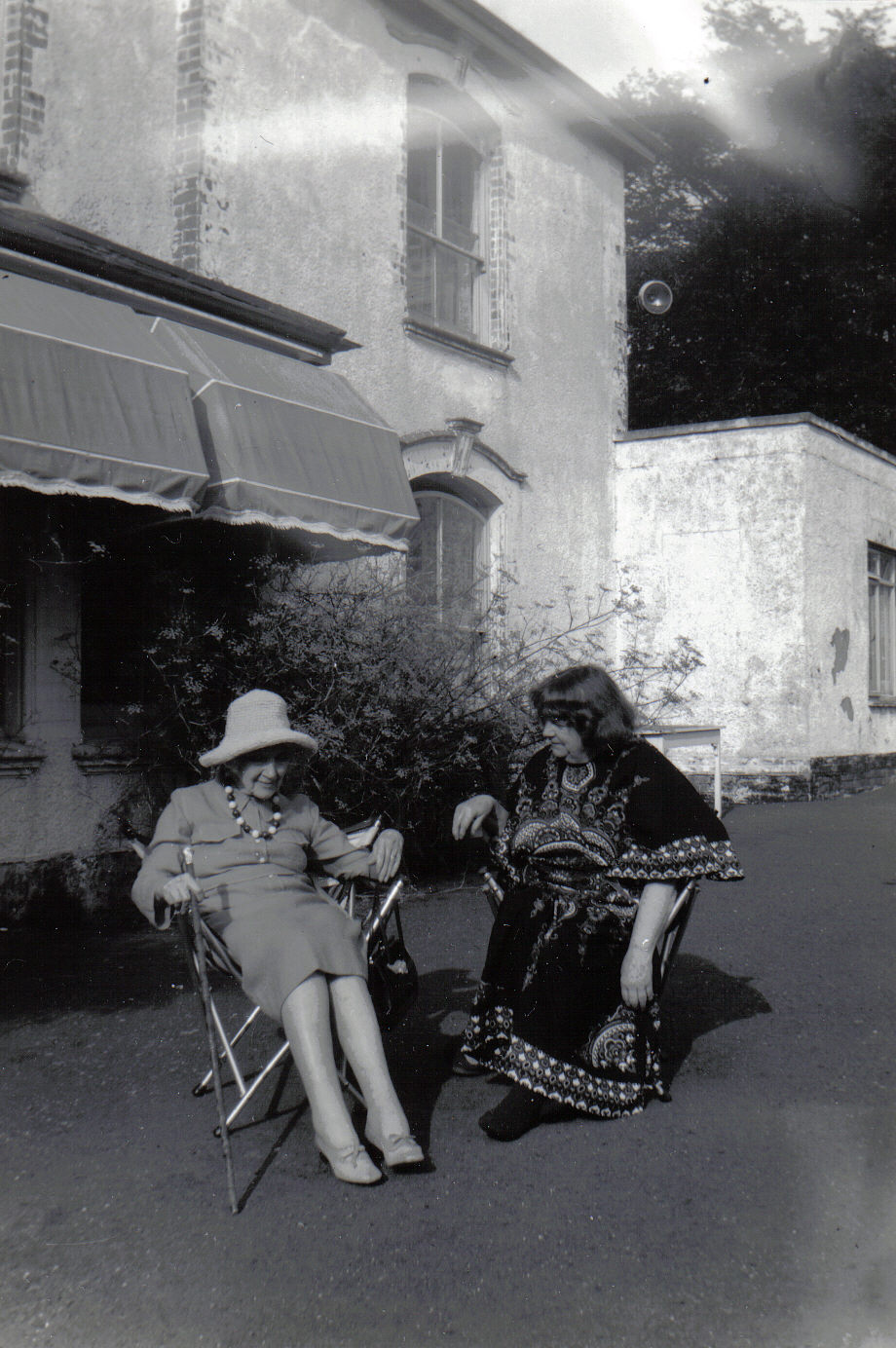
Jean Rhys, 1970

Wide Sargasso Sea is a British television adaptation of Jean Rhys's 1966 novel of the same name.

Produced by Kudos Film & Television for BBC Wales, the one-off 90-minute drama was first broadcast on digital television channel BBC Four on 9 October 2006. It was repeated on BBC One on Sunday, 22 October 2006, the week following the conclusion of BBC One's adaptation of Jane Eyre, to which Wide Sargasso Sea is a prequel.

The adaptation was scripted by playwright Stephen Greenhorn, produced by Elwen Rowlands and directed by Brendan Maher. It starred Rebecca Hall as Antoinette Cosway and Rafe Spall as Rochester.

== Cast ==
- Rebecca Hall as Antoinette Cosway
- Rafe Spall as Edward Rochester
- Nina Sosanya as Christophine
- Victoria Hamilton as Aunt Cora
- Fraser Ayres as Daniel
- Lorraine Burroughs as Amelie
- Alex Robertson as Richard Mason
- Karen Meagher as Grace Poole

== See also ==
- Wide Sargasso Sea (1993 film)
