= Lay the Favorite =

2012 American film by Stephen Frears

- UK theatrical release poster
- Directed by: Stephen Frears
- Screenplay by: D.V. DeVincentis
- Based on: Lay the Favorite: A Memoir of Gambling by Beth Raymer
- Produced by: Randall Emmett; George Furla; Paul Trijbits
- Starring: Bruce Willis; Rebecca Hall; Catherine Zeta-Jones; Joshua Jackson
- Cinematography: Michael McDonough
- Edited by: Mick Audsley
- Music by: James Seymour Brett
- Production companies: Wild Bunch; Emmett/Furla Films; Likely Story; Random House Films; Ruby Films; Jackson Investment Group; Lipsync Productions
- Distributed by: Radius-TWC
- Release dates: January 21, 2012 (Sundance Film Festival); December 7, 2012 (United States)
- Running time: 94 minutes
- Country: United States
- Language: English
- Box office: $1.5 million

Lay the Favorite is a 2012 American comedy-drama film directed by Stephen Frears and written by D.V. DeVincentis, and stars Bruce Willis, Rebecca Hall, Catherine Zeta-Jones and Joshua Jackson. Based on Beth Raymer's 2010 memoir of the same name, the film follows a young, free-spirited woman as she journeys through the legal and illegal world of sports gambling.

It premiered at the 2012 Sundance Film Festival on January 21 and was released on December 7 by The Weinstein Company through its RADiUS-TWC distribution arm. Lay the Favorite garnered negative reviews from critics and grossed $1.5 million.

== Plot ==
Beth is becoming bored with her life in Florida, doing stripteases and lap dances for private customers. Her dad, Jerry, unaware of the nature of her earning, tells her to follow her dream of moving to Las Vegas, where she seeks honest work as a cocktail waitress.

A young woman named Holly, who lives at the same Vegas motel, arranges for Beth to meet Dink Heimowitz, a professional gambler who follows the fast-changing odds on sporting events and employs assistants at Dink, Inc., to lay big-money bets for him. Beth is intrigued and it turns out she has a good mind for numbers, easily grasping Dink's system and becoming his protégée and he views her as his lucky charm. When Beth begins expressing a more personal interest in her much-older mentor, Dink's sharp-tongued wife, Tulip, lets it be known in no uncertain terms that she wants Beth out of her husband's life. As a result of the pressure from his wife, Dink lets Beth go.

A young journalist from New York, Jeremy, meets Beth in the casino and they immediately hit it off and she makes plans to move to New York with him, having nothing left in Las Vegas to keep her there. She is hooked on the excitement and income that gambling provides and backs out suddenly when Dink, facing a heavy losing streak without his lucky charm, asks her to come back to work for him.

When Dink's losing streak continues even with Beth's return, he has a meltdown and fires everyone in his office. Having enough, Beth goes to New York to be with Jeremy but accepts a similar job for a rival bookie called Rosie. Gambling is illegal in New York and Dink worries about Beth. Troy "Rosie" Rosalind, a former associate of Dink, then sets up a legal operation based in Curaçao and Beth goes down to help run the betting. Rosie and his men are more interested in drugs and hookers and Beth wants out. A New York gambler, Dave Greenberg, is in debt to Rosie for sixty-thousand dollars and may be working for the Feds.

Dink and his wife Tulip come to New York to help out Beth and Jeremy. They strong arm Greenberg and he gives them a hot tip on a New Jersey basketball team. The team wins in the last second by one point and everyone clears their gambling debts.

== Cast ==
- Bruce Willis as Dink Heimowitz
- Rebecca Hall as Beth Raymer
- Catherine Zeta-Jones as Tulip Heimowitz
- Joshua Jackson as Jeremy
- Vince Vaughn as Rosie
- Laura Prepon as Holly
- John Carroll Lynch as Dave Greenberg
- Corbin Bernsen as Jerry Raymer
- Frank Grillo as Franky
- Wayne Péré as Scott

== Production ==
Random House Films took the gambling memoir to Likely Story and Emmett/Furla Films to adapt the film. Filming began in April 2011 in Las Vegas, Nevada. Shooting also took place in New Orleans, and New York City. The Weinstein Company purchased distribution rights at Sundance Film Festival for a fall 2012 release. Wild Bunch was the film's international sales company.

== Reception ==
Lay the Favorite received negative reviews from critics. On the review aggregator website Rotten Tomatoes, 18% of 50 critics' reviews are positive, with an average rating of 3.8/10. The website's consensus reads: "A clumsy misstep for director Stephen Frears, Lay the Favorite puts all its chips on endearing quirk only to go bust." Metacritic, which uses a weighted average, assigned the film a score of 38 out of 100, based on 17 critics, indicating "generally unfavorable" reviews.

The A.V. Club's Nathan Rabin gave the film an overall "B−" grade, praising Willis for giving "a nicely shaded character actor turn" and Hall for emitting "irrepressible energy" in her role, writing that: "It's a decidedly soft-boiled tale populated by some of the nicest degenerate gamblers you'd ever want to meet." Jeremy Kay of The Guardian praised Hall for delivering "a fabulously ditzy turn that should gain her wider recognition in the US as a leading lady." He added that: "While this is a lesser work in the Frears canon, it's still a likable caper."

James Berardinelli wrote that despite Willis giving a "fine performance" as Dink Heimowitz, he felt the film was a "sitcom blown up to big-screen proportions" that carries "a series of missed opportunities" when delving into the characters' relationships and the gambling world, concluding that: "It won't take nearly as long to forget Lay the Favorite. It's the epitome of mediocrity - not a phrase often associated with a director having Frears' track record." Scott Tobias of NPR compared Lay the Favorite to the Demi Moore film Striptease, saying its "a listless comedy built around a vivacious protagonist" that carries a "neither-here-nor-there quality" based on non-commitment of adapting the material and "lack of directorial interest" from Frears. Steve Macfarlane of Slant Magazine wrote that: "Lay the Favorite is obviously worse than it should be, but it's also a thinner and more pallid experience than it would have been if it were a total catastrophe—if it had any ambition. As it stands, it's content to aim squarely for the much-celebrated Indiewood middle, and falls short.

== See also ==
- List of films set in Las Vegas
