= Bazabeel Norman =

Soldier of the American Revolutionary War (1750–1830)

Basil (Bazabeel) Norman
- Basil Norman's grave marker at the Mound Cemetery, Marietta, Ohio installed by the Daughters of the American Revolution.
- Born: Basil Norman; July 12, 1750; Frederick, Maryland, U.S.
- Died: July 17, 1830 (aged 80); Roxbury Township, Ohio, U.S.
- Occupations: Soldier, farmer, landowner
- Spouse: Fortune Stevens
- Children: 7
- Relatives: Maria Ewing (great-great-great granddaughter); Rebecca Hall (great-great-great-great granddaughter)

Basil Norman (12 July 1750 – 17 July 1830) was an American soldier, farmer, and landowner. A veteran of the Revolutionary War, he was awarded grants of land in Maryland and later in Ohio.

== Early life and education ==
Norman was born in 1750 into a free mixed-race, African-American family. Because his grandmother Elizabeth Norman (b.c.1695) was a white English woman, she was a free subject in the Maryland colony. She had come to serve as an indentured servant for a period to pay off her passage. Elizabeth's status meant that her children were also born free, according to colonial law, even if their father was of African ancestry. Mixed-race children were required to serve as indentured servants until adulthood. Elizabeth's indenture was also extended after the birth of each of at least two of her mixed-race children, according to court records.

Among her children was Jane Norman (b. 1715), a mixed-race girl who served a lengthy period of indenture. Jane had a relationship with a free man who was also of mixed race, British and African parentage, and serving an indenture.

Their children included Bazabeel Norman, also known as Bazaleel, Bazil, or Basil, born in Frederick, Maryland. He served an indenture until age 21 but was never enslaved, nor were his descendants. He may have served as a personal servant, or house servant, been trained as an artisan, or used to work in the fields.

== Military service ==
As armed confrontations increased with the outbreak of the Revolutionary War, Norman enlisted in 1777. He fought in at least five major military battles. He wrote: "I was in the Battles of Monmouth [28 June 1778], Campden [sic: Battle of Camden SC, 16 Aug 1780], Cowpens [17 Jan 1781] Gilford Courthouse [sic: Guilford Courthouse NC, 15 Mar 1781] & the Eutaw Springs [SC, 8 Sep 1781]".

After the war, in September 1782 he married Fortune Stevens (or Stephens, b. abt. 1755 in Frederick, Maryland.) They had six sons and one daughter, all of whom were probably born either in Maryland or Virginia: James (b. 1785), Grandison Pewinkle (b. 7 May 1788), Joseph (b. abt. 1794), Rebecca (b. 1795), Aquilla (b. 11 July 1797), Bazil Jr. (b. 1800), and Samuel (b. 1802).

Norman and his wife owned 40 acres of land in Frederick County which they sold 1 October 1814 for $250 to George Shamblin. This is after they had moved to Ohio.

Norman is one of the Maryland veterans who received land in northwestern Allegheny County, Maryland by lottery for his service during the Revolutionary War. This area is close to what is now West Virginia and then was still part of Virginia. His allotment, Lot #1281, contained a stream with a waterfall. It is now part of Swallow Falls State Park.

Later he got another grant of land in Ohio, and sold the 40 acres in Maryland. Norman is documented as the second landowner of color in the state of Ohio. The first was Richard Fisher. His daughter, Mary Anne Fisher, married Basil's son Aquila.

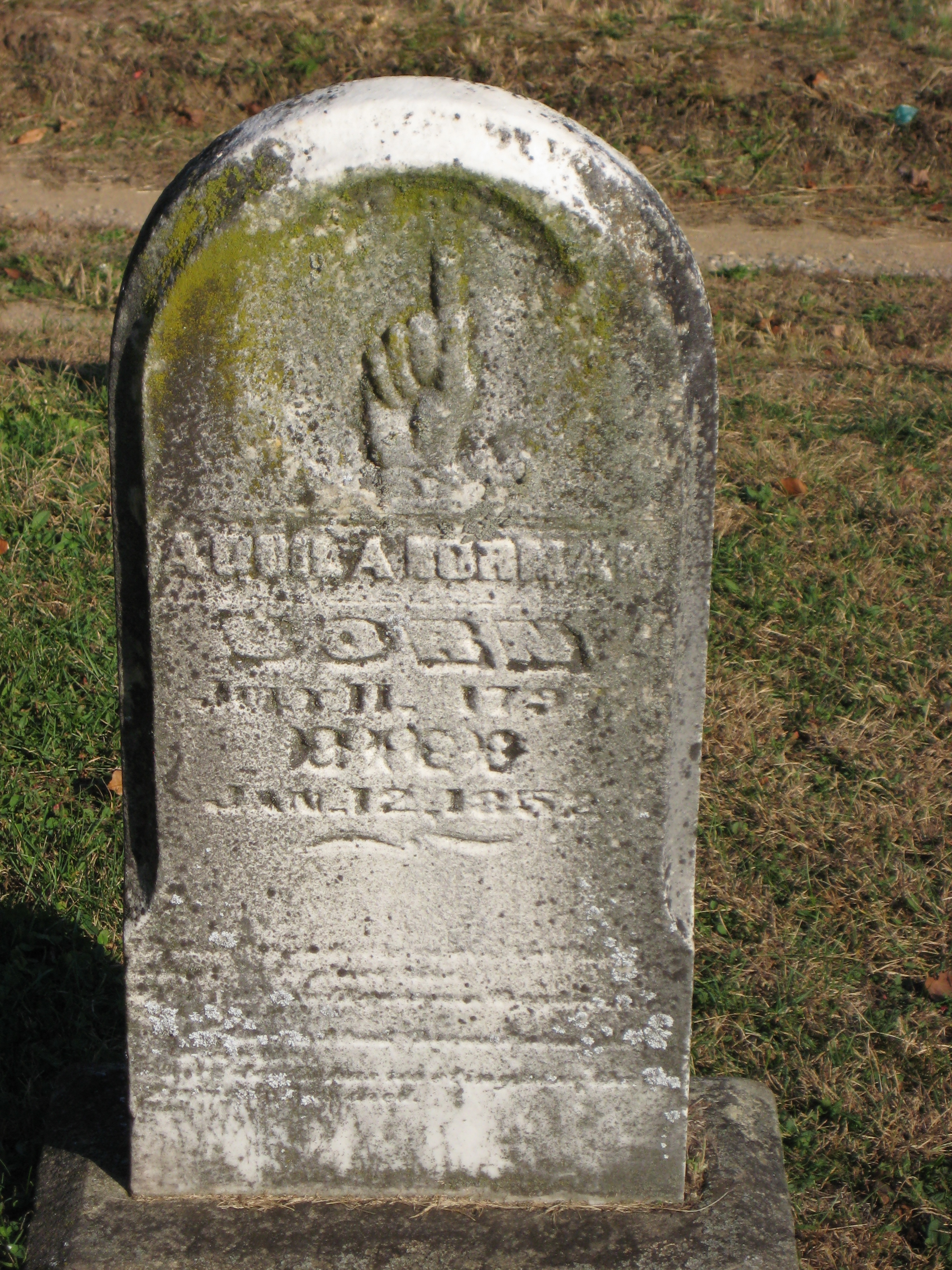
Headstone of Basil's son Aquila Norman in Rainbow Cemetery

Norman's obituary was published in the American Friend & Marietta Gazette newspaper on Saturday, July 24, 1830:

"Casualty. – On Saturday evening last Mr. Bazil Norman, of Roxbury Township, a man of color, left his house to go to watch a deer lick, and not returning in the course of the night, the next day a search was commenced under the belief that some accident had befallen him; after a diligent search by his family and neighbors, he was found dead hav-ing fallen from a precipice about twelve feet From appearances he had been to the lick and stayed the usual time, and late in the evening attempted to return, by the aid of a torch light; having a narrow pass to descend between some rocks about a half mile from the house, he missed his way a few yards, fell, and broke his neck. Mr. Norman was aged about 73 years – was a soldier in the revolutionary war, and at the time of his death received a pension from the United States."

His wife Fortune Stevens Norman applied for (April 14, 1837), and received, his $9.00 military pension seven years after his death. Norman was buried at Mound Cemetery in Marietta.

== Honors and legacy ==
A bronze plaque in Mound Cemetery in Marietta, Ohio, set in the early 20th century by the Daughters of the American Revolution, commemorates Basil Norman and his Revolutionary War service. (There is an error in Basil's birth year on the plaque, which shows '1757' instead of 1750.)

Norman's male descendants are known to have served in several major wars. At least three of Norman's descendants served in the American Civil War and died from wounds in battles.

American opera singer Maria Ewing is a three times great-grandchild of Basil Norman, through her mother's line. Her daughter, actress and director Rebecca Hall is thus a four times great-grandchild of Norman.
