= List of tallest buildings in Fukuoka =

Skyline of Fukuoka
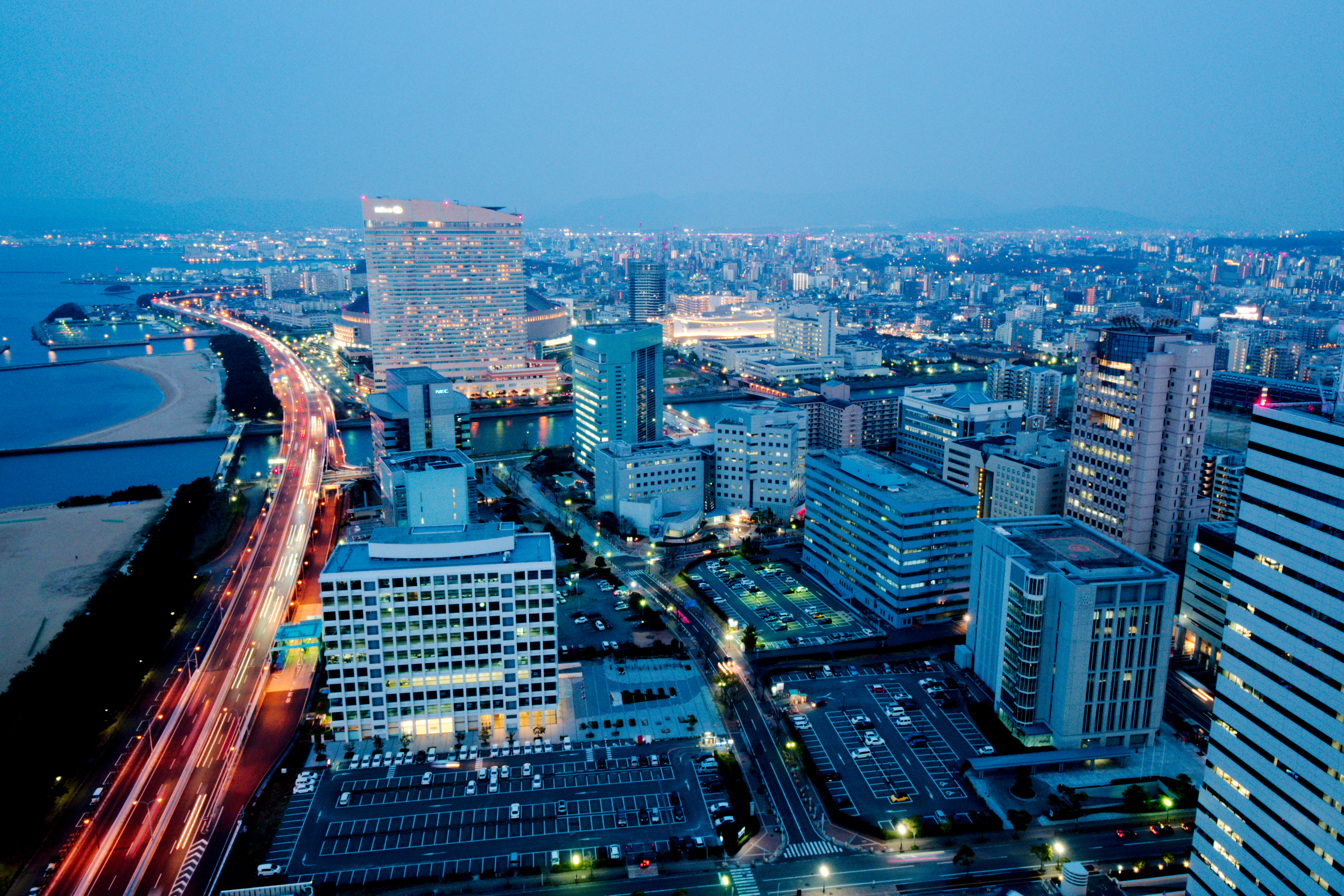
- Skyline of Fukuoka from Fukuoka Tower in 2019
- Tallest building: Island City Ocean & Forest Towers (2022)
- Tallest building height: 161.25 m (529 ft)
- Tallest structure: Fukuoka Tower (1989)
- Tallest structure height: 234 m (768 ft)
- First 150 m+ building: Center Marks Tower (2019)

Number of tall buildings (2026)
- Taller than 100 m (328 ft): 21
- Taller than 150 m (492 ft): 4

This list of tallest buildings in Fukuoka ranks buildings in Fukuoka, Japan, by height. Fukuoka is the sixth-largest city in Japan by population, the largest city on the island of Kyushu, and the capital of its eponymous prefecture. As of March 2024, Fukuoka has 3 completed skyscrapers over 150 meters (492 feet) and 20 completed buildings over 100 meters (328 feet).

The tallest buildings in Fukuoka are the twin residential towers of Island City Ocean & Forest Towers Residence. They were completed in 2023 and are 161 meters (528 feet) tall.

Fukuoka began constructing buildings over 100 meters tall during the 1990s. The tallest building built in that decade was Hilton Fukuoka Sea Hawk at 143 meters, which became the tallest building in the city. From 2015, Fukuoka continued to build high-rises at an increasing pace. Four buildings would exceed the height of the three towers of the Island Tower Sky Club, which were the tallest building in the city from 2008 to 2016.

While not a habitable building, Fukuoka Tower, at 234 meters tall, is the tallest structure in the city.

== Tallest buildings ==
This list ranks completed buildings in Fukuoka that stand at least 100 m (328 ft) tall, based on standard height measurement. This height includes spires and architectural details but does not include antenna masts. The "Year" column indicates the year of completion.

Was Fukuoka's tallest building upon completion

Rank	Name	Image	Height m (ft)	Floors	Year	Purpose	Notes
N/A	Fukuoka Tower 福岡タワー		234 (768)	4	1989	Observation	Not a habitable building. Included for comparative purposes.
1	Island City Ocean & Forest Towers Residence West アイランドシティ オーシャン＆フォレスト タワーレジデンス WEST	—	161 (528)	48	2022	Residential	Tallest building in Fukuoka since 2022. Tallest building completed in Fukuoka in the 2020s.
2	Island City Ocean & Forest Towers Residence East アイランドシティ オーシャン＆フォレスト タワーレジデンス EAST	—	161 (528)	48	2023	Residential	Tallest building in Fukuoka since 2023. Tallest building completed in Fukuoka in the 2020s.
3	Center Marks Tower センターマークスタワー		152 (499)	46	2019	Residential	Tallest building in Fukuoka from 2019 to 2023. Tallest building completed in Fukuoka in the 2010s.
4	Teriha The Tower 照葉ザ・タワー	—	150 (492)	44	2022	Residential	
5	I Tower アイタワー		149 (489)	45	2016	Residential	Tallest building in Fukuoka from 2016 to 2019.
6	Island Tower Sky Club Tower A アイランドタワースカイクラブ		145.3 (477)	42	2008	Residential	Tallest building in Fukuoka from 2008 to 2016.
7	Island Tower Sky Club Tower B アイランドタワースカイクラブ		145.3 (477)	42	2008	Residential	Tallest building in Fukuoka from 2008 to 2016.
8	Island Tower Sky Club Tower C アイランドタワースカイクラブ		145.3 (477)	42	2008	Residential	Tallest building in Fukuoka from 2008 to 2016.
9	Hilton Fukuoka Sea Hawk Hotel & Resort ヒルトン福岡シーホーク		143 (469)	34	1995	Hotel	Tallest hotel building in Fukuoka.
10	Brillia Tower Nishijin ブリリアタワー西新		137 (449)	40	2021	Residential	
11	Ribera Garden Marina Tower リベーラガーデン マリナタワー		115.3 (378)	33	2007	Residential	
12	Docomo Kashii Building; NTTドコモ九州香椎ビル		114.3 (375)	17	2003	Office	Tallest office building in Fukuoka.
13	Tenjin Sumitomo Life FJ Business Center 天神住友生命FJビジネスセンター		113 (371)	26	2025	Office	
14	Premist Chihaya Tower "Twinmarks" Air Tower プレミスト千早タワーツインマークス エアタワー		111.4 (365)	31	2011	Residential	
15	Premist Chihaya Tower "Twinmarks" Bright Tower プレミスト千早タワーツインマークス ブライトタワー		111.4 (365)	31	2011	Residential	
16	Fukuoka Daimyo Garden City Tower 福岡大名ガーデンシティ・タワー		111 (364)	25	2022	Office	
17	The Parkhouse Fukuoka Towers West ザ・パークハウス福岡タワーズ WEST		100.5 (330)	28	2019	Residential	
18	The Parkhouse Fukuoka Towers EAST ザ・パークハウス福岡タワーズ EAST		100.5 (330)	28	2020	Residential	
19	Montre Kashiihama Surftower Centercourt モントーレ香椎浜サーフタワー センターコート	—	100.5 (330)	32	2021	Office	
20	TNC Broadcasting Hall; TNC放送会館		100 (328)	21	1996	Office	
21	M Tower; Mタワー		100 (328)	21	1996	Office	

== Tallest under construction or proposed ==
=== Under construction ===
As of 2026, there are no buildings under construction in Fukuoka that are planned to be over 100 m (328 ft) tall.

=== Proposed ===
The following table includes approved and proposed buildings in Fukuoka that are expected to be at least 100 m (328 ft) tall as of 2026, based on standard height measurement. The “Year” column indicates the expected year of completion. A dash “–“ indicates information about the building’s height, floor count, or year of completion is unknown or has not been released.

Name	Height m (ft)	Floors	Year	Purpose	Notes
Fukuoka Tenjin Center Building Reconstruction Plan	106 (348)	21	2028	Office	

== Timeline of tallest buildings ==
This lists buildings that once held the title of the tallest building in Fukuoka.

Name	Image	Years as tallest	Height m (ft)	Floors	Notes
Atmos Momochi		1993–1995	88 (289)	25	
Hilton Fukuoka Sea Hawk Hotel & Resort		1995–2008	143 (469)	36	
Island Tower Sky Club		2008–2016	145.3 (477)	42	
I Tower		2016–2019	149 (489)	45	
Center Marks Tower		2019–2022	152 (499)	46	
Island City Ocean & Forest Towers Residence	—	2022–current	161 (528)	48	

== See also ==
- List of tallest buildings in Japan
