= List of Godzilla Island episodes =

Godzilla Island consists of 256 episodes, each of which is 3 minutes long. The episodes make up 22 complete stories of varying lengths - one is only 3 episodes long, while the final arc is 23 episodes, so stories can take anywhere between half a week and three weeks to fully air.

== Story 1 (Introducing Torema Saga) ==
No.	Title	Original release date
1	"Attack of the Massive UFO!"	October 6, 1997
2	"The Mysterious Spaceship—Friend or Foe?"	October 7, 1997
3	"Introducing Torema!"	October 8, 1997
4	"Godzilla Attacks!"	October 9, 1997
5	"The Indomitable Pair"	October 10, 1997

== Story 2 (King Ghidorah Saga) ==
No.	Title	Original release date
6	"A Sudden Conflict"	October 13, 1997
7	"Mothra's Persuasion"	October 14, 1997
8	"Battle! Torema vs. Zagreth"	October 15, 1997
9	"Godzilla Awakens!"	October 16, 1997
10	"The Cost of Victory"	October 17, 1997
11	"King Ghidorah's Revenge"	October 20, 1997
12	"A Psychokinetic Last Resort"	October 21, 1997
13	"Torema's Will"	October 22, 1997
14	"The Unforgivable Zagreth"	October 23, 1997
15	"Torema Forever"	October 24, 1997

== Story 3 (The Trial of Godzilla Saga) ==
No.	Title	Original release date
16	"Godzilla's Alibi"	October 27, 1997
17	"I am Innocent!"	October 28, 1997
18	"Godzilla Escapes"	October 29, 1997
19	"The Order to Kill Godzilla"	October 30, 1997
20	"A Scheme Revealed"	October 31, 1997

== Story 4 (Junior's Abduction Saga) ==
No.	Title	Original release date
21	"Son of Godzilla"	November 3, 1997
22	"Torema and Junior"	November 4, 1997
23	"Junior Kidnapped"	November 5, 1997
24	"Operation Rescue Junior"	November 6, 1997
25	"Taking Back Junior"	November 7, 1997
26	"The Impregnable Stronghold"	November 10, 1997
27	"The White Flag of Regret"	November 11, 1997
28	"Mothra, Charge!"	November 12, 1997
29	"Heaven and Earth"	November 13, 1997
30	"Raise the Flag of Victory!"	November 14, 1997

== Story 5 (Gigan Saga) ==
No.	Title	Original release date
31	"The New Invasion"	November 17, 1997
32	"Strength of Hope"	November 18, 1997
33	"Premonition"	November 19, 1997
34	"The Duel"	November 20, 1997
35	"Distress Call"	November 21, 1997
36	"Godzilla, Dies"	November 24, 1997
37	"Rematch!"	November 25, 1997
38	"In The Dark Night, A Battle Commences"	November 26, 1997
39	"The Conviction"	November 27, 1997
40	"The New Power"	November 28, 1997

== Story 6 (Mothra Saga) ==
No.	Title	Original release date
41	"The Rise of Mothra"	December 1, 1997
42	"Hedorah, Attack"	December 2, 1997
43	"Mothra's Life-and-Death Challenge"	December 3, 1997
44	"New Juvenile, Leo"	December 4, 1997
45	"The Battle of Mothra"	December 5, 1997
46	"The God of Peace's Own Battle"	December 8, 1997
47	"Sacrifice"	December 9, 1997
48	"Rebirth and Death: Cycle of the Guardian"	December 10, 1997
49	"The Will to Protect The Earth"	December 11, 1997
50	"Rise, Leo!"	December 12, 1997

== Story 7 (Mecha-King Ghidorah Saga) ==
No.	Title	Original release date
51	"The Mass Invasion"	December 15, 1997
52	"Rain of Despair"	December 16, 1997
53	"Hopelessness"	December 17, 1997
54	"X Destruction Strategy-Part 1"	December 18, 1997
55	"X Destruction Strategy-Part 2"	December 19, 1997
56	"The Machine King of Terror"	December 22, 1997
57	"Unfathomable Giant Dark Emperor"	December 23, 1997
58	"The Gravemarkers of the Dead Warriors"	December 24, 1997
59	"Fear Infestation Directive"	December 25, 1997
60	"The Calling"	December 26, 1997
61	"Return, Mecha-King Ghidorah"	December 29, 1997
62	"Zombie invasion!"	December 30, 1997
63	"All-Out Giant Monster Attack!"	December 31, 1997

== Story 8 (The Mystery of Godzilla Island Saga) ==
No.	Title	Original release date
64	"The Mystery of Godzilla Island 1: Secrecy"	January 5, 1998
65	"The Mystery of Godzilla Island 2: Realm"	January 6, 1998
66	"The Mystery of Godzilla Island 3: Manifestation"	January 7, 1998
67	"The Mystery of Godzilla Island 4: Kaiser"	January 8, 1998
68	"The Mystery of Godzilla Island 5: Clash"	January 9, 1998

== Story 9 (SpaceGodzilla's Spirit Saga) ==
No.	Title	Original release date
69	"Survival Trial"	January 12, 1998
70	"Newcomer from the Spirit World"	January 13, 1998
71	"Type-66 BX"	January 14, 1998
72	"The Record"	January 15, 1998
73	"Another Side"	January 16, 1998
74	"The Doppleganger Ghost"	January 19, 1998
75	"Search for Great Power"	January 20, 1998
76	"Godzilla, Berserk"	January 21, 1998
77	"Total Destruction"	January 22, 1998
78	"The Ancient Guardian"	January 23, 1998
79	"Godzilla, Returned"	January 26, 1998
80	"The Target"	January 27, 1998
81	"Impossible Struggle"	January 28, 1998
82	"Separation"	January 29, 1998
83	"Junior's Battle"	January 30, 1998

== Story 10 (The Artificial Sun Saga) ==
No.	Title	Original release date
84	"The Nine Suns"	February 2, 1998
85	"Apocalyptic Event"	February 3, 1998
86	"Last Chance"	February 4, 1998
87	"Operation Outbreak"	February 5, 1998
88	"The Fiery Flame"	February 6, 1998
89	"The Solar Self-Destruction"	February 9, 1998
90	"The Laser Gun"	February 10, 1998
91	"Don't Hesitate, Just Shoot! Torema"	February 11, 1998
92	"The Most Critical Moment"	February 12, 1998
93	"Shoot the Fake Solar System"	February 13, 1998

== Story 11 (Mechagodzilla Saga) ==
No.	Title	Original release date
94	"Dismission"	February 16, 1998
95	"The Climax Challenge"	February 17, 1998
96	"Take Off! Black Mechagodzilla"	February 18, 1998
97	"The Duel: Godzilla vs Xiliens"	February 19, 1998
98	"You're a Coward!"	February 20, 1998
99	"Captivity!"	February 21, 1998
100	"Dying At The Same Time"	February 24, 1998
101	"The True Intention: Annihilation Project"	February 25, 1998
102	"A Desperate Situation: Earth Was In A Grave Danger!"	February 26, 1998
103	"Zagreth Praised As A Hero"	February 27, 1998

== Story 12 (Goodbye, Torema Saga) ==
No.	Title	Original release date
104	"The Monster from the Next Island: Site B Sunk"	March 2, 1998
105	"The 100 Monster Army And The Return of Xiliens"	March 3, 1998
106	"The Perfectly-Devised Trap Plan"	March 4, 1998
107	"The Tricky Gift from the Giant Dark Emperor"	March 5, 1998
108	"Strike Proto Moguera! Plan Z"	March 6, 1998
109	"Unbreakable Friendship"	March 9, 1998
110	"SOS! Godzilla Island in Danger Once Again"	March 10, 1998
111	"Burned Base"	March 11, 1998
112	"Invitation"	March 12, 1998
113	"The Promise"	March 13, 1998
114	"Go! Torema"	March 14, 1998
115	"Back into Darkness' Side"	March 17, 1998
116	"Escape from The X-UFO"	March 18, 1998
117	"Gigan Appears, The Robot Bird With Saber Arms"	March 19, 1998
118	"Until That Day, We Were Happy"	March 20, 1998
119	"Large Pinch"	March 21, 1998
120	"The King has Returned"	March 24, 1998
121	"The Anger of the Giant Dark Emperor"	March 25, 1998
122	"Charge! Vabaruda-Part 1"	March 26, 1998
123	"Charge! Vabaruda-Part 2"	March 27, 1998
124	"Charge! Vabaruda-Part 3"	March 30, 1998
125	"Farewell Good Friend"	March 31, 1998

== Story 13 (Bonus Saga) ==
No.	Title	Original release date
126	"Torema's Flashback"	April 1, 1998
127	"Godzilla's Flashback"	April 2, 1998
128	"Along With Godzilla"	April 3, 1998

== Story 14 (Introducing Misato Saga) ==
No.	Title	Original release date
129	"A New Enemy, A New Fight"	April 6, 1998
130	"Landes Appears, New Xiliens"	April 7, 1998
131	"Don't Lie To Me!!"	April 8, 1998
132	"Challengers of Godzilla Island!"	April 9, 1998
133	"The Monster Doctor Appeared"	April 10, 1998
134	"It is The Land of No Return!"	April 13, 1998
135	"Space Proposal"	April 14, 1998
136	"The Secret"	April 15, 1998
137	"Don't Touch the Missiles"	April 16, 1998
138	"Infernal Smoke of Death"	April 17, 1998
139	"Landes Attacks Again! The Strike Back of Xiliens"	April 20, 1998
140	"Now Dance Up"	April 21, 1998
141	"Dance Dance Dance!"	April 22, 1998
142	"After the Request"	April 23, 1998
143	"There's Nothing to Do! I'm tired"	April 24, 1998
144	"The Plan Begins"	April 27, 1998
145	"Dancing the Sunda Dance"	April 28, 1998
146	"King Ghidorah Attacks! Three Kings"	April 29, 1998
147	"King Ghidorah!"	April 30, 1998
148	"The Dance of Revenge and Destruction"	May 1, 1998

== Story 15 (Second Generation Mothra Saga) ==
No.	Title	Original release date
149	"Gorath, Crashes"	May 4, 1998
150	"Godzilla Will Never Back Down"	May 5, 1998
151	"Mothra's Egg has Survived"	May 6, 1998
152	"Mothra's Distress"	May 7, 1998
153	"Unison"	May 8, 1998
154	"The Mothra Song"	May 11, 1998
155	"Protect Mothra's Egg!"	May 12, 1998
156	"Years of Resentment"	May 13, 1998
157	"The Commander's Order"	May 14, 1998
158	"Take Off Tart-Coupe!"	May 15, 1998
159	"The Larval Mothra is Discovered!"	May 18, 1998
160	"Landes' Scheme"	May 19, 1998
161	"Junior is Targeted"	May 20, 1998
162	"Mothra vs. Godzilla"	May 21, 1998
163	"Battra and Baby Mothra"	May 22, 1998
164	"Misato vs. Landes"	May 25, 1998
165	"The Cruelty of Landes"	May 26, 1998
166	"Baby Mothra Awakes"	May 27, 1998
167	"Mothra's Counterattack"	May 28, 1998
168	"Mothra Returns Home"	May 29, 1998

== Story 16 (Dororin Saga) ==
No.	Title	Original release date
169	"Gigan in the Midst of Training"	June 1, 1998
170	"A Historic and Unprecedented Reputation Match"	June 2, 1998
171	"The Present from the Giant Emperor"	June 3, 1998
172	"Transformation Monster Dororin"	June 4, 1998
173	"The Duel on the Thunder Planes"	June 5, 1998
174	"Somehow it Carries On!"	June 8, 1998
175	"Call Godzilla!"	June 9, 1998
176	"Nao's Adventure"	June 10, 1998
177	"A Man's Romance!?"	June 11, 1998
178	"Fumiya of Gigan"	June 12, 1998

== Story 17 (Anguirus saga) ==
No.	Title	Original release date
179	"Porcupine's Dilemma"	June 15, 1998
180	"I Must Know the Secret"	June 16, 1998
181	"Cactus Plaza"	June 17, 1998
182	"Anguirus' Great Shock"	June 18, 1998
183	"Plant Monster Gororin"	June 19, 1998
184	"Feeling Helpless"	June 22, 1998
185	"The Back of Anguirus"	June 23, 1998
186	"The Commander's Reflection"	June 24, 1998
187	"Anguirus Endures"	June 25, 1998
188	"A Victorious V Goal!"	June 26, 1998

== Story 18 (SpaceGodzilla's Spirit Again Saga) ==
No.	Title	Original release date
189	"The Strongest Monster"	June 29, 1998
190	"The Evil Spirit Revives"	June 30, 1998
191	"Who is the True Criminal?"	July 1, 1998
192	"The Evil Spirit Takes Form"	July 2, 1998
193	"The Frightened Monsters"	July 3, 1998
194	"Search Gabara Pond"	July 6, 1998
195	"The True Nature of the Evil Spirit"	July 7, 1998
196	"Landes Sulks"	July 8, 1998
197	"The Super Gigantic Godzilla Appears"	July 9, 1998
198	"Landes' Anger"	July 10, 1998

== Story 19 (Fire Rodan Saga) ==
No.	Title	Original release date
199	"A Strange Mushroom"	July 13, 1998
200	"Neo Hedorah Appears"	July 14, 1998
201	"Neo Hedorah is Victorious"	July 15, 1998
202	"G-Guard Base is Polluted"	July 16, 1998
203	"A Mysterious Power"	July 17, 1998
204	"Misato's Prayer"	July 20, 1998
205	"The Ceremony Goes Wrong"	July 21, 1998
206	"Invincible Neo Hedorah"	July 22, 1998
207	"The Birth of Fire Rodan!"	July 23, 1998
208	"Extreme Temperature! Double Blaze"	July 24, 1998

== Story 20 (Lucas Saga) ==
No.	Title	Original release date
209	"The Great Spy Game"	July 27, 1998
210	"A Parcel Delivery from the Earth's Government"	July 28, 1998
211	"Lucas' Great Shock"	July 29, 1998
212	"The Anti-Animal Laser Gun is Out of Control!"	July 30, 1998
213	"G-Guard Surrenders!"	July 31, 1998
214	"There's Nothing More That Can Be Done"	August 3, 1998
215	"Reunion"	August 4, 1998
216	"The Base Recapture Strategy"	August 5, 1998
217	"Counterattack"	August 6, 1998
218	"Lucas Endures"	August 7, 1998

== Story 21 (The Secret of G Island Saga) ==
No.	Title	Original release date
219	"The Hieroglyph Floats in the Sky"	August 10, 1998
220	"Pick Up That Object!"	August 11, 1998
221	"An Unexpected Relationship"	August 12, 1998
222	"A Disappointing Victory"	August 13, 1998
223	"Two Kaiju Die"	August 14, 1998
224	"An Aurora of Mystery"	August 17, 1998
225	"The Invisible Wall"	August 18, 1998
226	"Enormous Barrier"	August 19, 1998
227	"Top Secret"	August 20, 1998
228	"The Illusionary Continent"	August 21, 1998
229	"The Forbidden Super Weapon"	August 24, 1998
230	"The Revival of the Two Kaiju"	August 25, 1998
231	"Godzilla in a Large Pinch"	August 26, 1998
232	"All-Purpose Battleship (Gotengo)"	August 27, 1998
233	"Delicious Air"	August 28, 1998

== Story 22 (Conclusion Saga) ==
No.	Title	Original release date
234	"A Mysterious Electric Wave"	August 31, 1998
235	"Landes is Dismissed"	September 1, 1998
236	"Zagreths' Restoration"	September 2, 1998
237	"Sudden Insanity"	September 3, 1998
238	"The Threat of Zagreth"	September 4, 1998
239	"Torema has Returned"	September 7, 1998
240	"Godzilla, Revived!"	September 8, 1998
241	"Save Misato!"	September 9, 1998
242	"The Mural of the Giant Emperor"	September 10, 1998
243	"Warp Gate"	September 11, 1998
244	"Usurpation of Zagreth"	September 14, 1998
245	"The Treason of Zagreth"	September 15, 1998
246	"Hurry! Gotengo"	September 16, 1998
247	"It Appears! The True Form of the Giant Emperor"	September 17, 1998
248	"Suicidal Explosion, Vabaruda"	September 18, 1998
249	"The Truth Revealed"	September 21, 1998
250	"Torema's Feelings"	September 22, 1998
251	"Misato's Decision"	September 23, 1998
252	"The Final Battle"	September 24, 1998
253	"Landes Lives"	September 25, 1998
254	"It Appears! The Dark Giant Emperor"	September 28, 1998
255	"Warp Gate Reversal!"	September 29, 1998
256	"Goodbye Godzilla Island"	September 30, 1998
