= SpaceGodzilla =

Kaiju from Godzilla franchise

- Godzilla character
- SpaceGodzilla, as depicted in Godzilla vs. SpaceGodzilla
- First appearance: Godzilla vs. SpaceGodzilla (1994)
- Created by: Kensho Yamashita; Hiroshi Kashiwabara; Shinji Nishikawa
- Portrayed by: Ryō Haritani

In-universe information
- Relatives: Godzilla (progenitor)

SpaceGodzilla (スペースゴジラ, Supēsugojira) is a fictional character who first appeared in Toho's 1994 film Godzilla vs. SpaceGodzilla as the main antagonist. He is depicted as a crystalline, mutated clone of Godzilla, of whose cells SpaceGodzilla is derived.

In November 2025, a filing for the final feature credits of the upcoming 2027 film Godzilla x Kong: Supernova revealed that the character would appear in the film.

== Overview ==
=== Development ===
Early concept art of SpaceGodzilla

The character was designed as a homage to the monster's hinted progenitor Biollante by incorporating tusks and a hissing roar reminiscent of the latter monster. Creature designer Shinji Nishikawa had initially envisioned SpaceGodzilla as a much more Western dragon-like creature with large fin-like wings on the back. Other early designs for the proposed "Astrogodzilla" included it being an albino Godzilla with expansive wings, two tails, and the ability to fire an ice ray. Another design for SpaceGodzilla had the character be a quadruped or a much more Biollante-like monster commanding a horde of cosmic dragonflies. The final design bore greater resemblance to Godzilla's final form from the video game Super Godzilla, itself also designed by Nishikawa. Special effects artist Koichi Kawakita decided to incorporate crystals onto the SpaceGodzilla design, and added a prominent horn on the creature's head in order to hint at its power and imply it had radar abilities.

In his debut film, SpaceGodzilla's origins are left ambiguous, but it is theorized that he was born through Godzilla's cells (transported into space either by Mothra or Biollante's spores) being exposed to the radiation of a black hole. SpaceGodzilla heads for Earth and traps Little Godzilla in a crystalline prison, before travelling to Fukuoka and forming a crystal fortress which drains the city of power, channels it through Fukuoka Tower and transfers it to SpaceGodzilla. He is ultimately stopped through the combined efforts of Godzilla and M.O.G.U.E.R.A.

== Film history ==
=== Godzilla vs. SpaceGodzilla (1994) ===
SpaceGodzilla was created when G-cells cast into space fell into a black hole and reemerged from a white hole, starting to assimilate crystalline organisms while rapidly evolving, the final result being SpaceGodzilla. How the G-cells were cast into space is unknown, but there are two reasons stated in the film. Mothra may have brought G-cells into space after her battle with Battra in Godzilla vs. Mothra. Another suggestion is that when Biollante's spores flew into space, some of her G-cells were responsible for the creation of SpaceGodzilla. After being born, SpaceGodzilla was sighted flying through space in his flying form as he destroyed a NASA space station. The Japan Self-Defense Force's mecha M.O.G.U.E.R.A (Mobile Operations G-Force Universal Expert Robot: Aero-type) was deployed to attack him, but he was ultimately defeated. He later set his sights on Baas Island, home of Godzilla and Little Godzilla, where he captured Little Godzilla using his telekinetic crystals, forming a crystal prison around him. He then left Baas Island and set up his crystal fortress in Fukuoka, but M.O.G.U.E.R.A tried to stop him. SpaceGodzilla overpowered M.O.G.U.E.R.A until it teamed up with Godzilla and split into different mecha, Land M.O.G.U.E.R.A and the Star Falcon. Land M.O.G.U.E.R.A went for the foundation of his fortress as Godzilla razed the Fukuoka Tower, knowing it was the source of his cosmic clone's power. Godzilla and M.O.G.U.E.R.A fought SpaceGodzilla, with M.O.G.U.E.R.A blasting SpaceGodzilla's shoulder crystals, critically weakening him. In pain and anger, SpaceGodzilla destroyed M.O.G.U.E.R.A, but not before Akira Yuki drives M.O.G.U.E.R.A to knock SpaceGodzilla down. Godzilla uses his red spiral heat ray several times at SpaceGodzilla, destroying him in the process. However in the end, the JSDF claims that if they keep polluting space, another SpaceGodzilla may appear someday.

=== Godzilla x Kong: Supernova (2027) ===
When the teaser for the 2027 film Godzilla x Kong: Supernova debuted and revealed the film's title, it elicited fan speculations regarding whether SpaceGodzilla and/or Gigan would appear in the film as an antagonist. In November 2025, the Writers Guild of America West published the final feature credits for Godzilla x Kong: Supernova, with the "Source Material" credits revealing that SpaceGodzilla would appear in the film.

=== Other ===
In Godzilla Island episodes 1-5, Xilien Zagreth attacked Godzilla Island. When Torema attacked her ship, she released SpaceGodzilla to attack. Godzilla roars at his clone. SpaceGodzilla reaches the Command Center and attacks, shooting the Command Center with his ray. Godzilla then arrives and grapples with SpaceGodzilla, neither being able to overpower the other. Torema then tells Godzilla to destroy SpaceGodzilla's shoulder crystals. Godzilla obeys and fires his atomic ray, blowing up the crystals. Godzilla and Torema's ship fire their rays, and the combined efforts destroy SpaceGodzilla.

After attempting to and failing to possess Godzilla as a ghost, SpaceGodzilla returned to Godzilla Island in a new more powerful physical form called Super Special SpaceGodzilla High Grade Type 2. However, he was defeated in this form again by Godzilla after the Monster King destroyed his left shoulder crystal and forced to retreat back to outer space.

In Godziban, SpaceGodzilla-kun is a doppelganger to Godzilla-kun that travels to Earth alongside his brothers SpaceMinilla and SpaceLittle, battling Gabara and Gigan upon their arrival. It is later revealed the trio are the result of Godzilla-kun's father Taigo's transformation into Super Godzilla resulting in some of his scattered G-cells fusing with energy crystals that broke from Gorath's surface upon its destruction.

== Powers and abilities ==
SpaceGodzilla can exhale a Corona Beam from his mouth. When he flies, he takes the form of a crystal cocoon. He can also generate a photon shield for protection.

SpaceGodzilla also possesses telekinetic abilities. He can also summon crystals from the ground. He can absorb and manipulate the energy around him. He can emit electromagnetic waves. The crystals on SpaceGodzilla's shoulders serve as his energy source.

== Reception ==
While the film received mixed reactions, SpaceGodzilla was generally well received. DVD Cult said, "The monster SpaceGodzilla is excellently designed, and is certainly far more menacing than anything Dean Devlin and Roland Emmerich ever dreamed up." Toho Kingdom praised his theme music, and said "SpaceGodzilla has a nice, hectic, theme that suits him and works well when used throughout the movie," while Complex listed the character as number 11 on its "The 15 Most Badass Kaiju Monsters of All Time" list, calling him "probably the most powerful thing Godzilla has ever faced". However, the character's design was criticized by Godzilla historian Steve Ryfle, who stated that, although evil-looking, it was too evocative of the haphazardly designed monsters of the generally low-quality Godzilla films of the 1970s like Hedorah and Gigan.

== Appearances ==
=== Film ===
- Godzilla vs. SpaceGodzilla (1994)
- Godzilla x Kong: Supernova (2027)

=== Television ===
- Godzilla Island (1997-1998)
- Godziban (2019-present)

=== Video games ===
- Godzilla Trading Battle (PlayStation - 1998)
- Godzilla: Kaijuu no Daishingeki (Sega Game Gear and Master System system - 1995)
- Godzilla: Save the Earth (Xbox, PS2 - 2004)
- Godzilla: Unleashed (Wii, PS2 - 2007) - original
- Godzilla Unleashed: Double Smash (NDS - 2007)
- Godzilla: The Game (PS4 - 2015)
- Godzilla Defense Force (2019)
- Godzilla Battle Line (2021)

=== Literature ===
- Godzilla vs. SpaceGodzilla (manga - 1994)
- Godzilla: Ongoing (comic - 2012)
- Godzilla: The Half-Century War (comic - 2012–2013)
- Godzilla: Rulers of Earth (comic - 2013–2015)
- Godzilla in Hell (comic - 2015)
- Godzilla x Kong: Supernova - The Official Movie Novelization (2027)

=== Other games ===
- Ikoria: Lair of the Behemoths, a Magic: The Gathering expansion. The promotional card was renamed due to SpaceGodzilla's weapon, the Corona Beam, being too similarly named to the concurrent COVID-19 pandemic.
