= Godzilla Island =

- Title card
- Genre: Tokusatsu; Kaiju; Science fiction
- Developed by: Toho
- Written by: Takahiko Masuda
- Directed by: Shun Mizutani
- Narrated by: Yutaka Aoyama
- Country of origin: Japan
- No. of episodes: 256 (list of episodes)

Production
- Running time: 3 minutes

Original release
- Network: TXN (TV Tokyo)
- Release: October 6, 1997 – September 30, 1998

Godzilla Island (ゴジラアイランド, Gojira Airando) is a television show spinoff of the Godzilla franchise. It premiered on October 6, 1997, and ran for a total of 256 three-minute episodes, finishing on September 30, 1998.

== Premise ==
Set in 2097, most of Earth's kaiju (monsters) live on an island out in the Pacific Ocean called Godzilla Island, which is monitored by G-Guard. The creatures living on the island includes Godzilla, Godzilla Junior, Mothra, Mothra Leo, Rodan, Fire Rodan, King Ghidorah, Mecha-King Ghidorah, Mechagodzilla (the Heisei version), Anguirus, Gigan, Hedorah, Destoroyah, Baragon, King Caesar, Moguera, Megalon, Battra, SpaceGodzilla, Gorosaurus, Kamacuras and Jet Jaguar. Torema and Zagreth's kaiju (or monsters) includes a black-coloured Mechagodzilla (the Showa version), a fully mechanical King Ghidorah (called Hyper-Mecha King Ghidorah), a new version of Hedorah (called Neo Hedorah), Kumasogami (named Dororin in the series), Jigora (a species of kaiju from Torema's home planet that looks like pallette swaps of Godzilla Junior), a powered-up version of SpaceGodzilla, a different version of Fake Godzilla, Proto Moguera (Which resembles the original Moguera from The Mysterians) and Gororin (a sentient ball-shaped cactus). One kaiju that did not appear in a Godzilla movie, a miniature version of Dogora, also appears for a few episodes, working with Zagreth. Kumonga, Ebirah, Varan, Manda, the Showa Mechagodzilla, Titanosaurus, Gabara (though a location is named after him), Minilla, Biollante, Oodako, Ookondoru, and Shockirus does not appear in the series. Ebirah, Manda and Varan are mentioned in the theme song, while King Kong does not appear in the series due to legal reasons.

== Cast ==
- Jiro Dan as G-Guard Commander
- Maimi Okuwa as Torema
- Kaori Aso as Misato
- Nagisa Sawamura as Nao
- Naoko Aizawa as Zagreth
- Kaoru Ukawa as Randeth

=== Voices ===
- Kenichiro Shimamura as Lucas
- Yutaka Aoyama as Narrator

== Marketing ==
A large number of tie-in toys were produced for this series by Bandai, since this series' kaiju sequence was filmed through the use of action figures.

A CD of theme music, mostly composed by Akira Ifukube, was released in 1997 by Polygram entitled 'Welcome To Godzilla Island'.

== Release ==
In 2007, a 4-disc DVD set including every episode of the show was released in Japan at a price of 16,000 yen (approx. $160).

In 2018, Toho began streaming the series in Japan on the official Godzilla YouTube channel, with each episode made available for four weeks after its release.

In 2023, Toho began releasing episodes with English subtitles though the official Godzilla by Toho YouTube channel, the first time the series was made available outside of Japan.
