= The Times-Independent =

Weekly newspaper published in Moab, Utah

- Type: Weekly newspaper
- Format: Broadsheet
- Owner(s): The Salt Lake Tribune, Inc.
- Founder: J.N. Corbin
- Founded: 1896
- Language: English
- Headquarters: Moab, Utah
- Sister newspapers: The Salt Lake Tribune
- Website: moabtimes.com

The Times-Independent (sometimes abbreviated The T-I) is a weekly newspaper located in Moab, Utah and serving Grand County, Utah.

== History ==
On May 30, 1896, J.N. Corbin published the first edition of the Grand Valley Times in Moab, Utah. The paper was acquired by Edgar L. Beard in 1906, C.A. Robertson in 1907, and Loren L. "Bish" Taylor in 1911.

H.W. Cherry established a rival paper called the Moab Independent. It was first published on April 15, 1917. That August, Cherry resigned and was succeeded by F.W. Strong.

On September 11, 1919, the Times merged with the Independent to form The Times-Independent. Times owner Taylor became editor and Independent owner Strong became business manager. Taylor published the paper until his death in 1972 at age 80, and the publication was then inherited by his son Samuel J. Taylor.

In 2023, Zane Taylor, Bish Taylor's grandson, announced the Taylor family had donated The Times-Independent to The Salt Lake Tribune, Inc., a nonprofit which owned and operated The Salt Lake Tribune.
