= Island Tower Sky Club =

Skyscraper in Island City, Fukuoka, Fukuoka Prefecture, Japan

Coordinates: 33°39′43″N 130°25′14″E

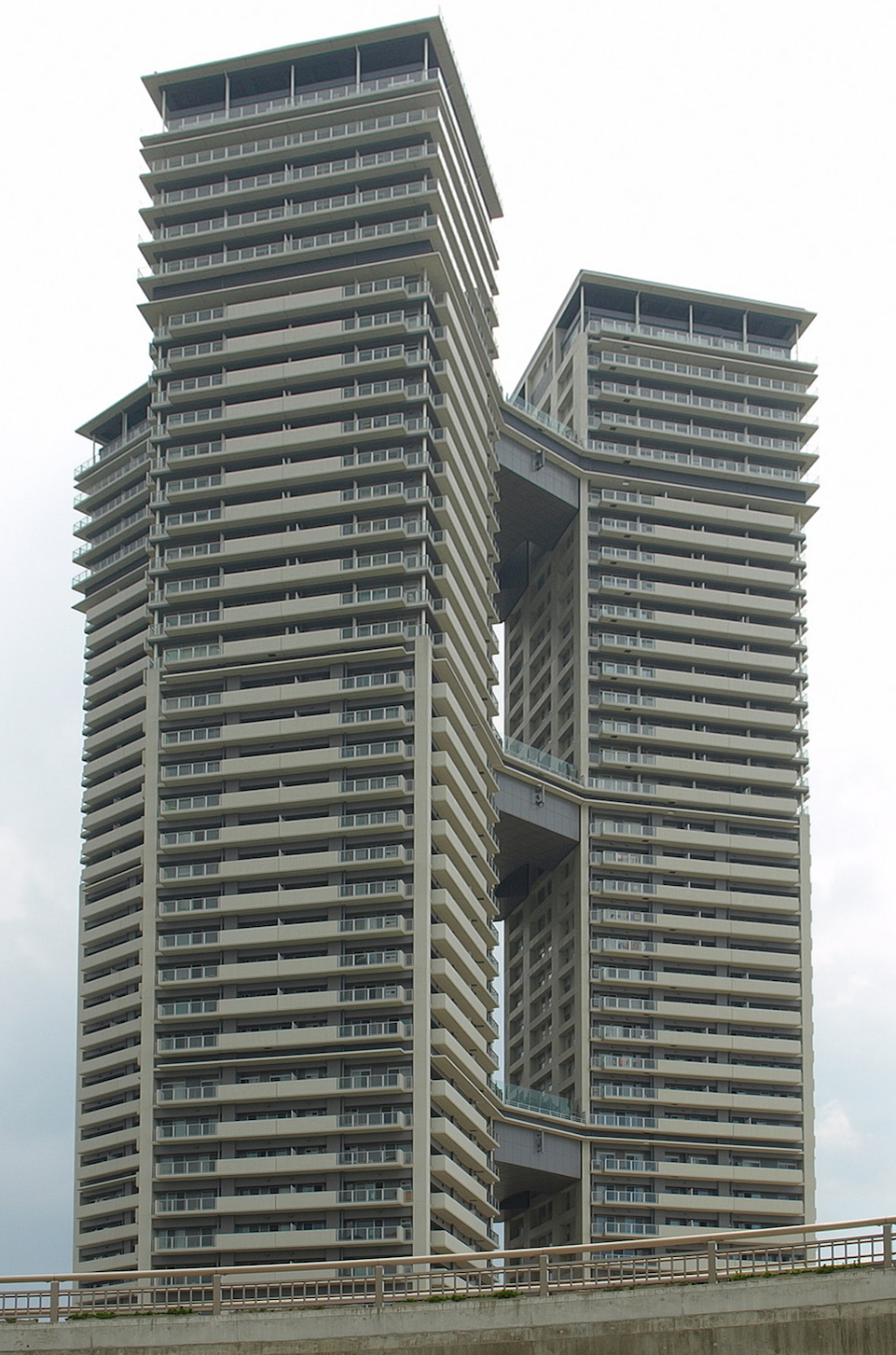
Island Tower Sky Club in 2010

The Island Tower Sky Club (アイランドタワースカイクラブ, Airando Tawaa Sukai Kurabu) is a skyscraper located in Island City, Fukuoka, Fukuoka Prefecture, Japan. Construction of the 145-metre, 42-storey skyscraper was finished in 2008.
