= Fukuoka Tower =

Observation tower in Fukuoka, Japan

Coordinates: 33°35′35.7″N 130°21′5.3″E

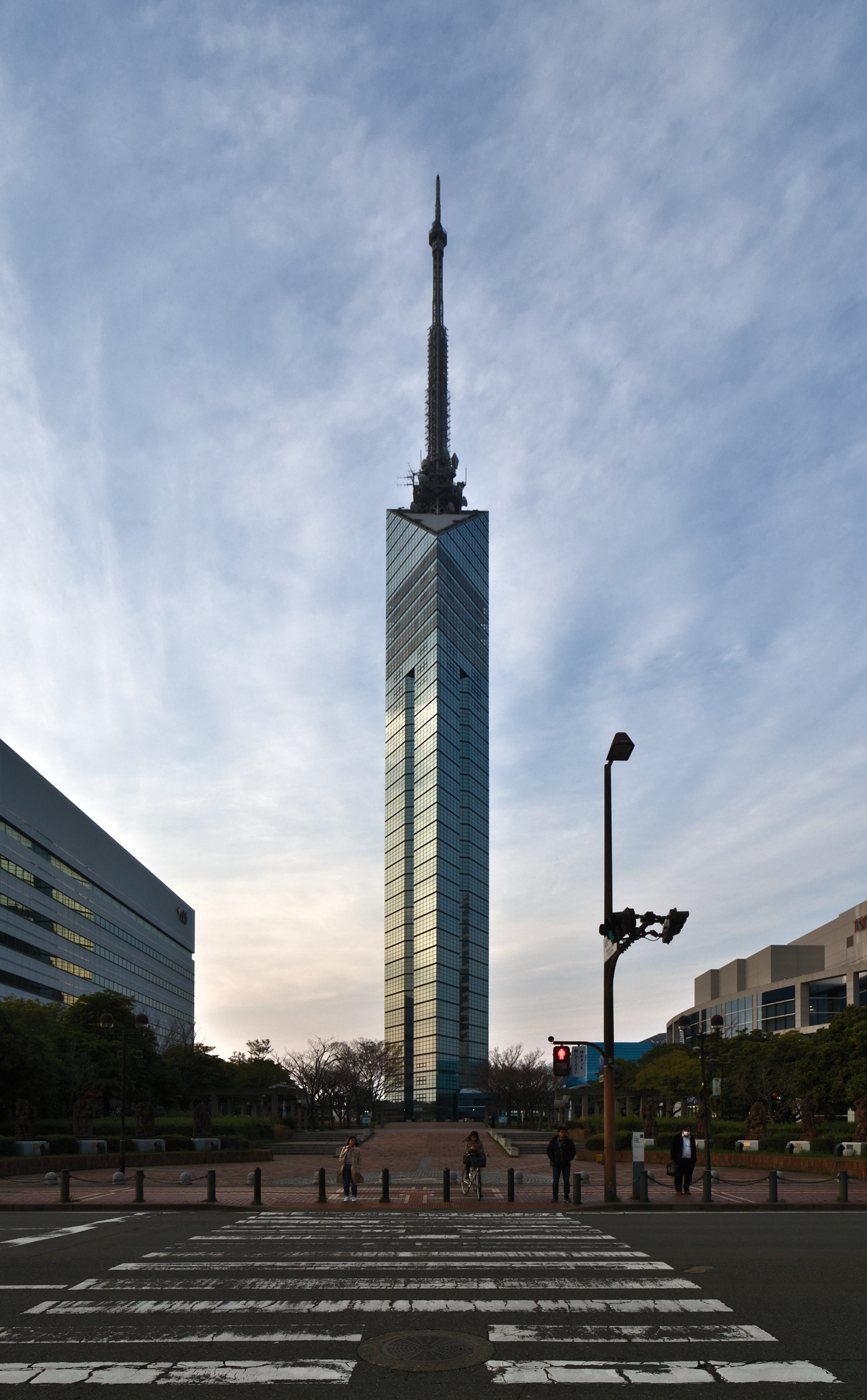
Front of Fukuoka Tower

Fukuoka Tower (福岡タワー, Fukuoka Tawā) is a 234-metre (768 ft) tall tower located in the Momochihama area of Fukuoka, Japan. It is the tallest seaside tower in Japan. The highest observation deck at 123 metres has a 360° view of the surrounding area, being most visited at sunset. Fukuoka Tower was finished in 1989, taking a total of 14 months to build at a cost of ¥6 billion (roughly equivalent US$45 million in 1989). It was designed by Nikken Sekkei and constructed on a reclaimed land out of Hakata Bay.

== Architecture ==
Fukuoka Tower has a triangular cross-section which is covered with 8000 half-mirrors, giving it the appearance of a skyscraper. Because of this, it has been given the nickname "Mirror Sail". The half-mirrors reflect the sky when viewed from outside the structure, while also allowing visitors to see outside when riding elevators to the top. The space between the base and the observation decks is hollow and thus unoccupied. There are three observation decks: one at 116 metres, a café/lounge deck at 120 metres, and the highest at 123 metres above the ground. Above this level rises a 111-metre television mast.

The underground weight of Fukuoka Tower is 25,000 tons. Its weight above ground, by contrast, is only 3,500 tons. The tower is designed to withstand magnitude 7 earthquakes and wind speeds up to 65 m/s (145 miles per hour (233 km/h)). The strongest recorded earthquake in the area has been magnitude 6 and the strongest winds 49 m/s (110 miles per hour (180 km/h)). The tower is located at 2-3-26 Momochihama, Sawara-ku, Fukuoka.

== In popular culture ==
Fukuoka Tower makes a prominent film appearances in Godzilla films:

- In the 1991 film Godzilla vs. King Ghidorah, King Ghidorah briefly damages the tower during he attacks Fukuoka under the rogue Futurians' control.
- In the 1994 film Godzilla vs. SpaceGodzilla, the extraterrestrial creature SpaceGodzilla uses the tower to absorb energy before Godzilla destroys the tower after the foundation is weakened by the JSDF's mecha M.O.G.U.E.R.A..

== Gallery ==
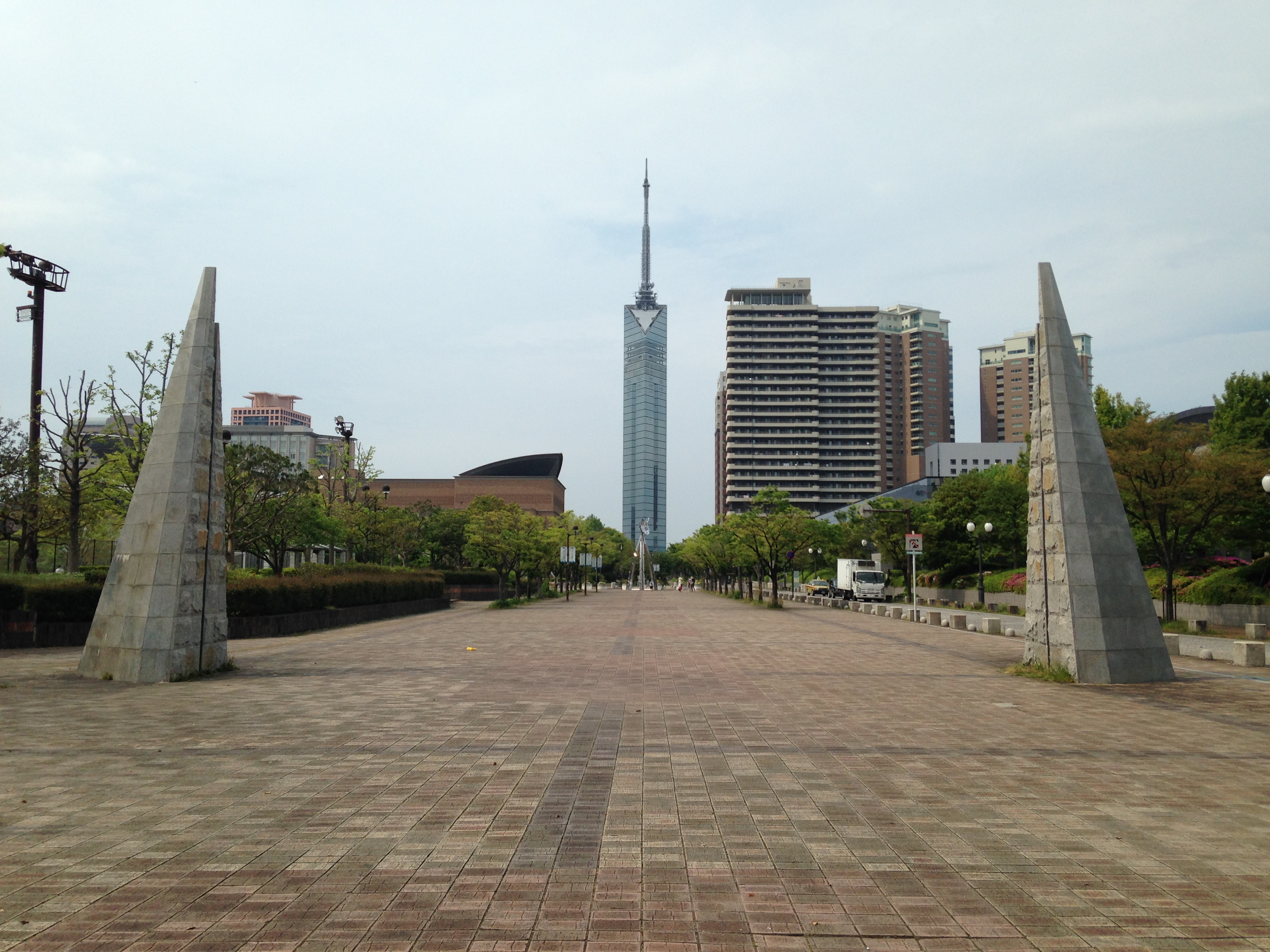
Seen from Sazae-san Street

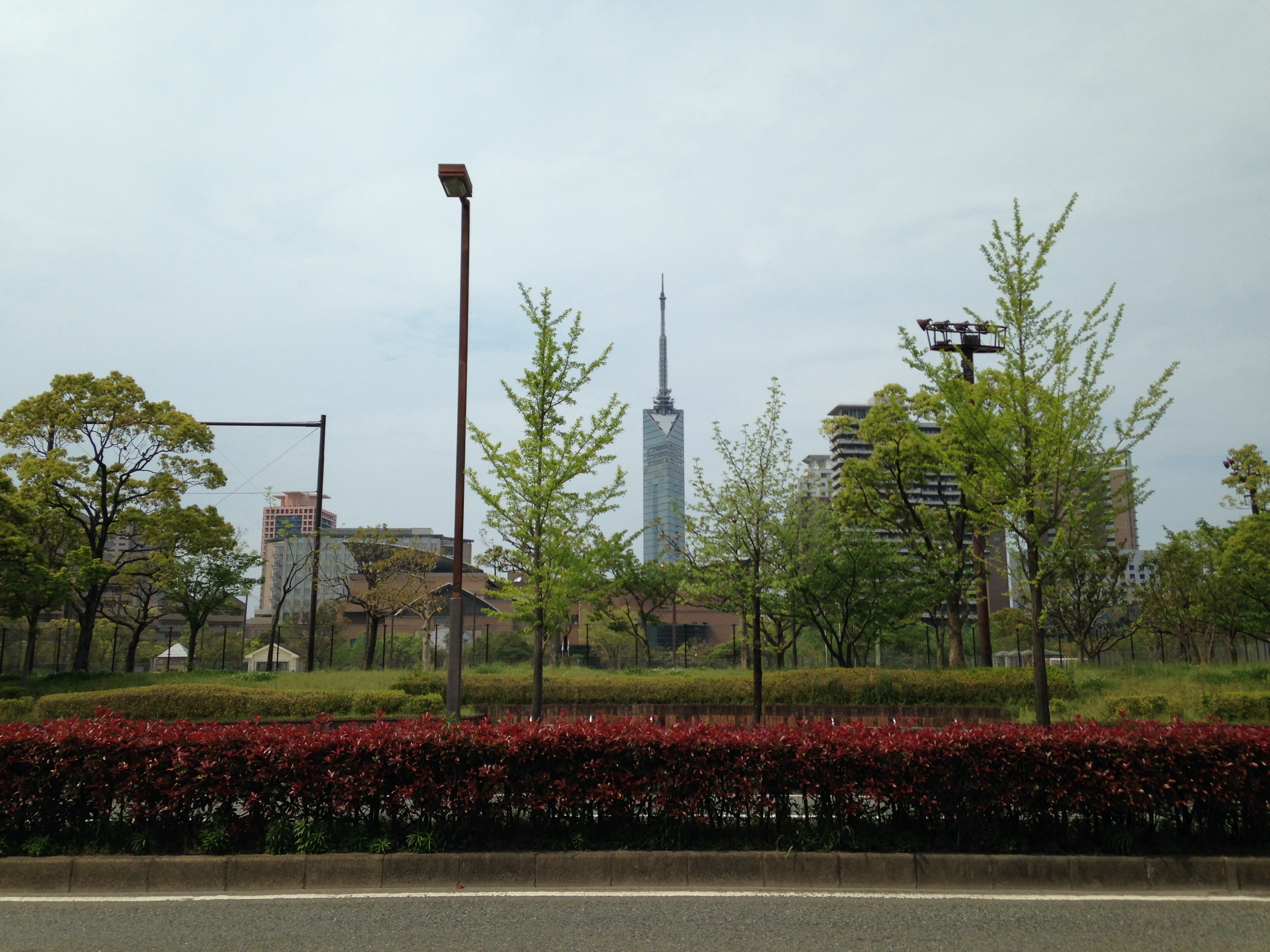
Seen from Momochi Central Park

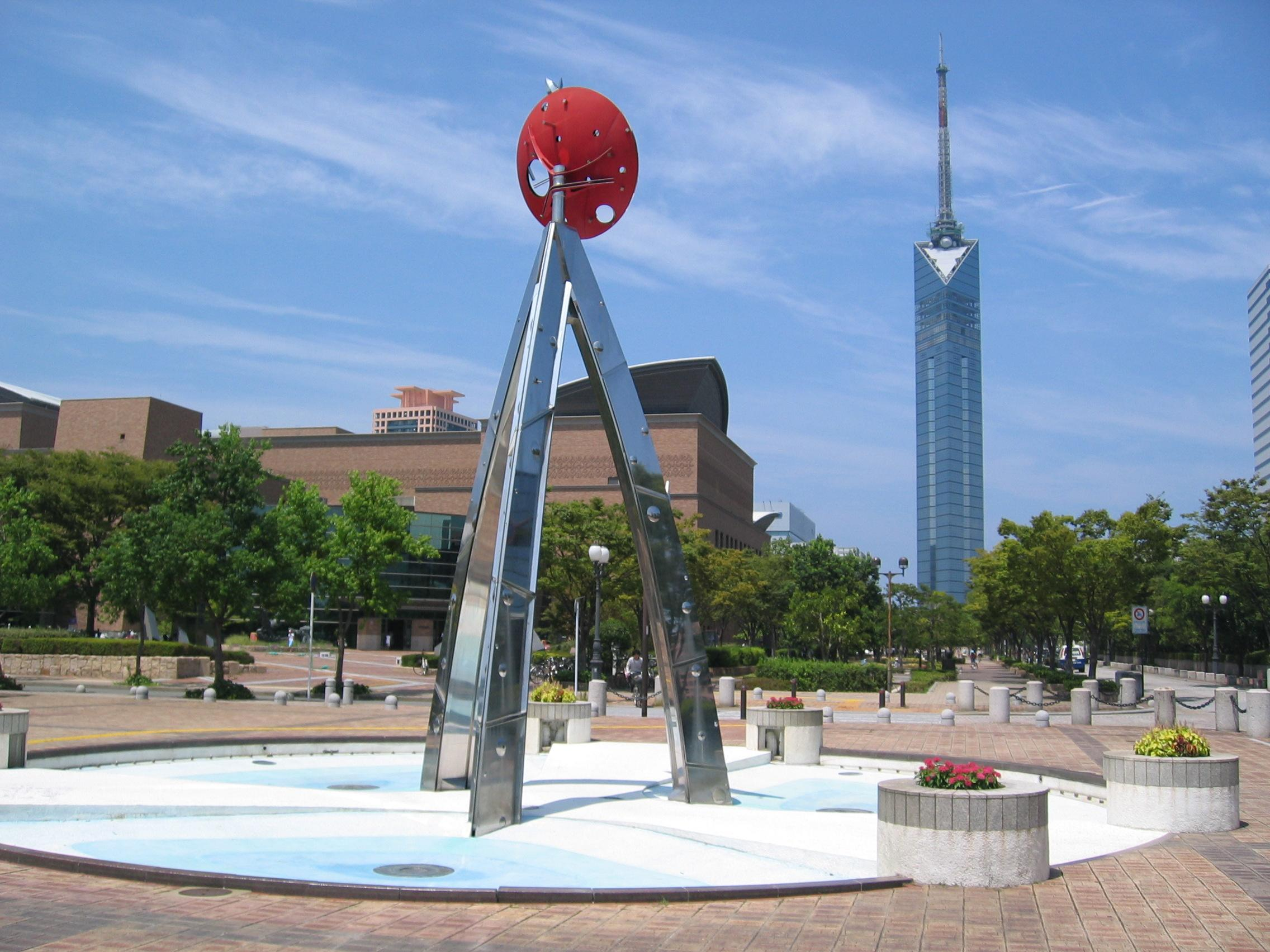
Seen from Momochi Central Park

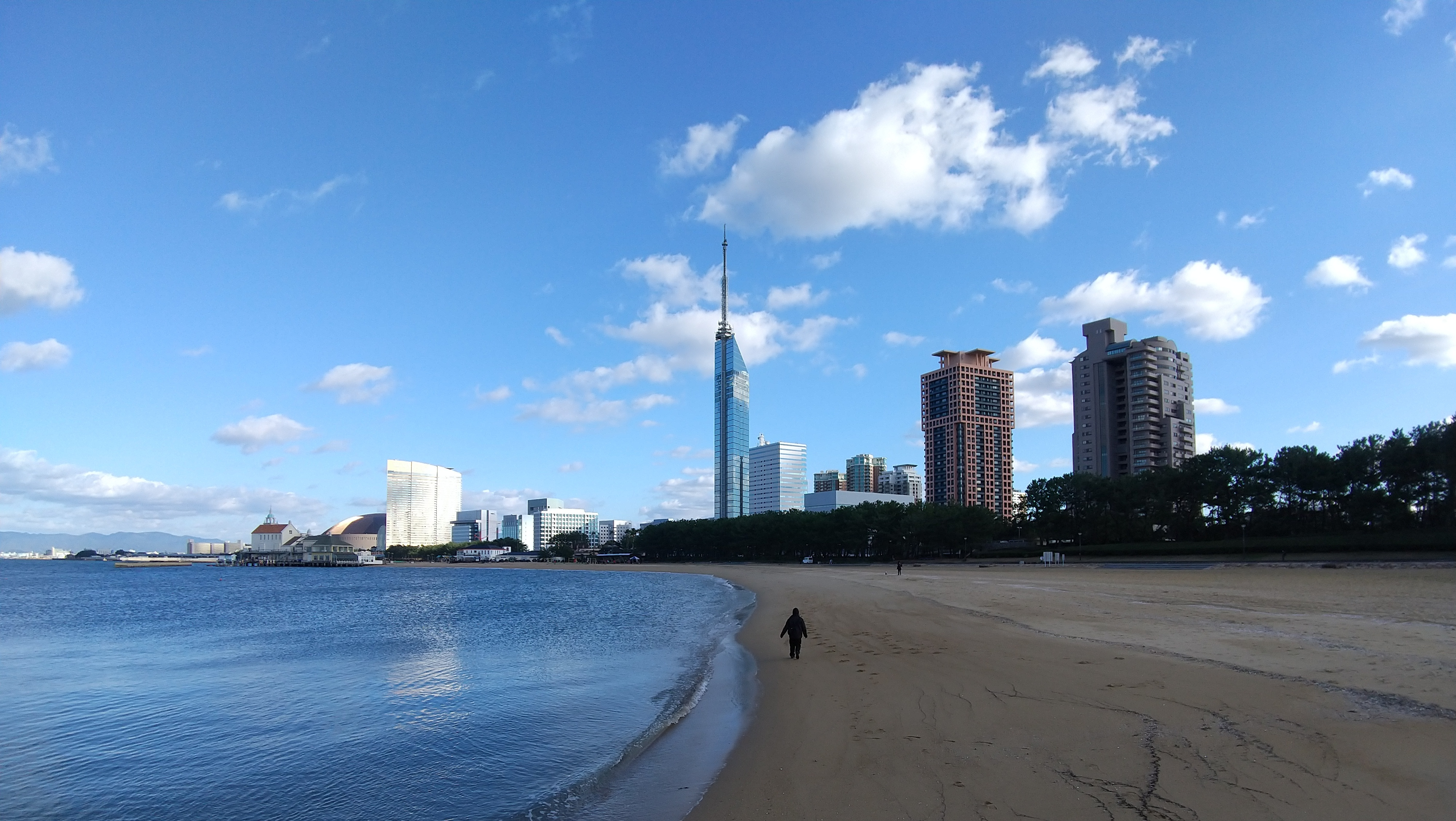
Seen from the coast

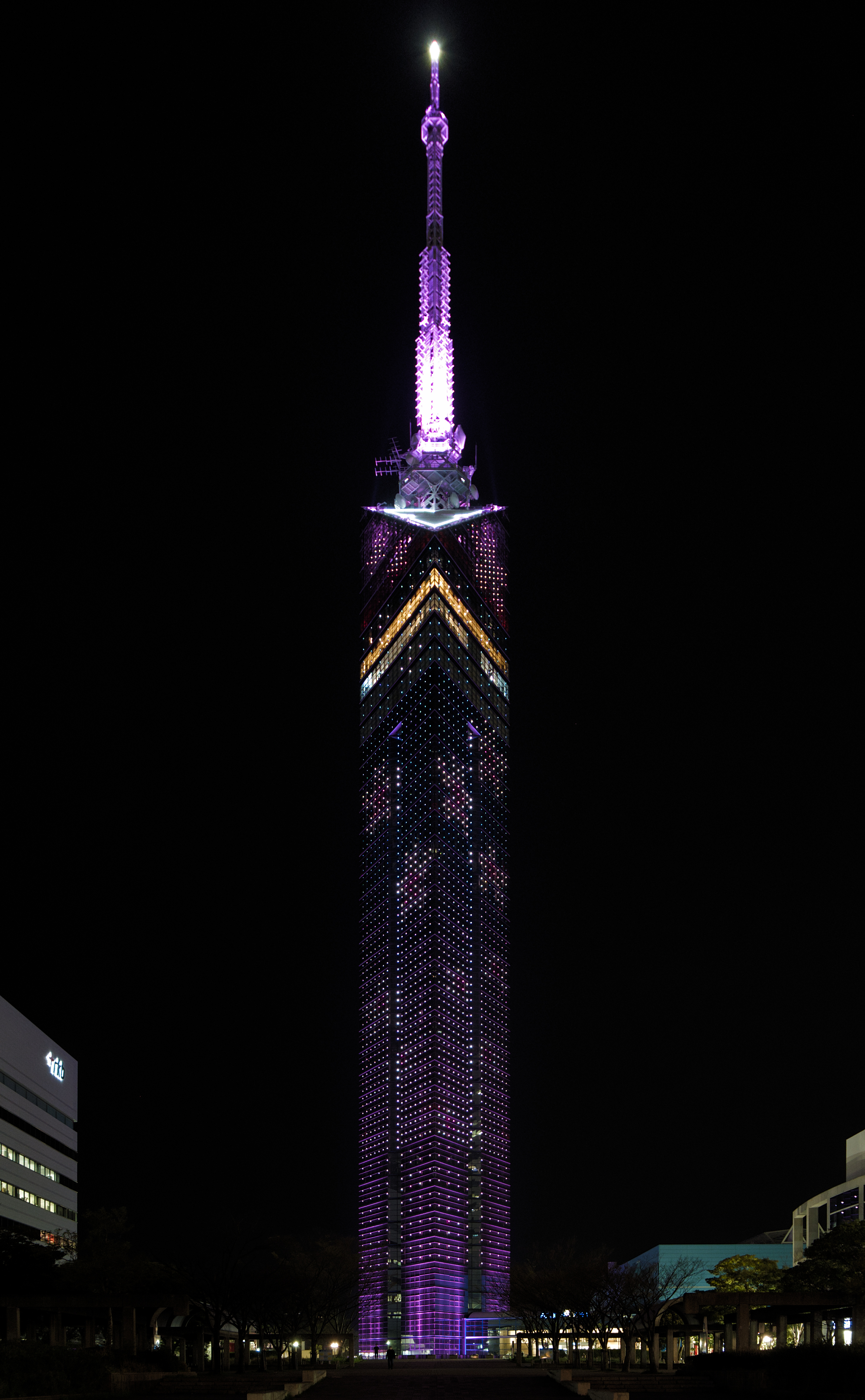
At night with sakura illumination

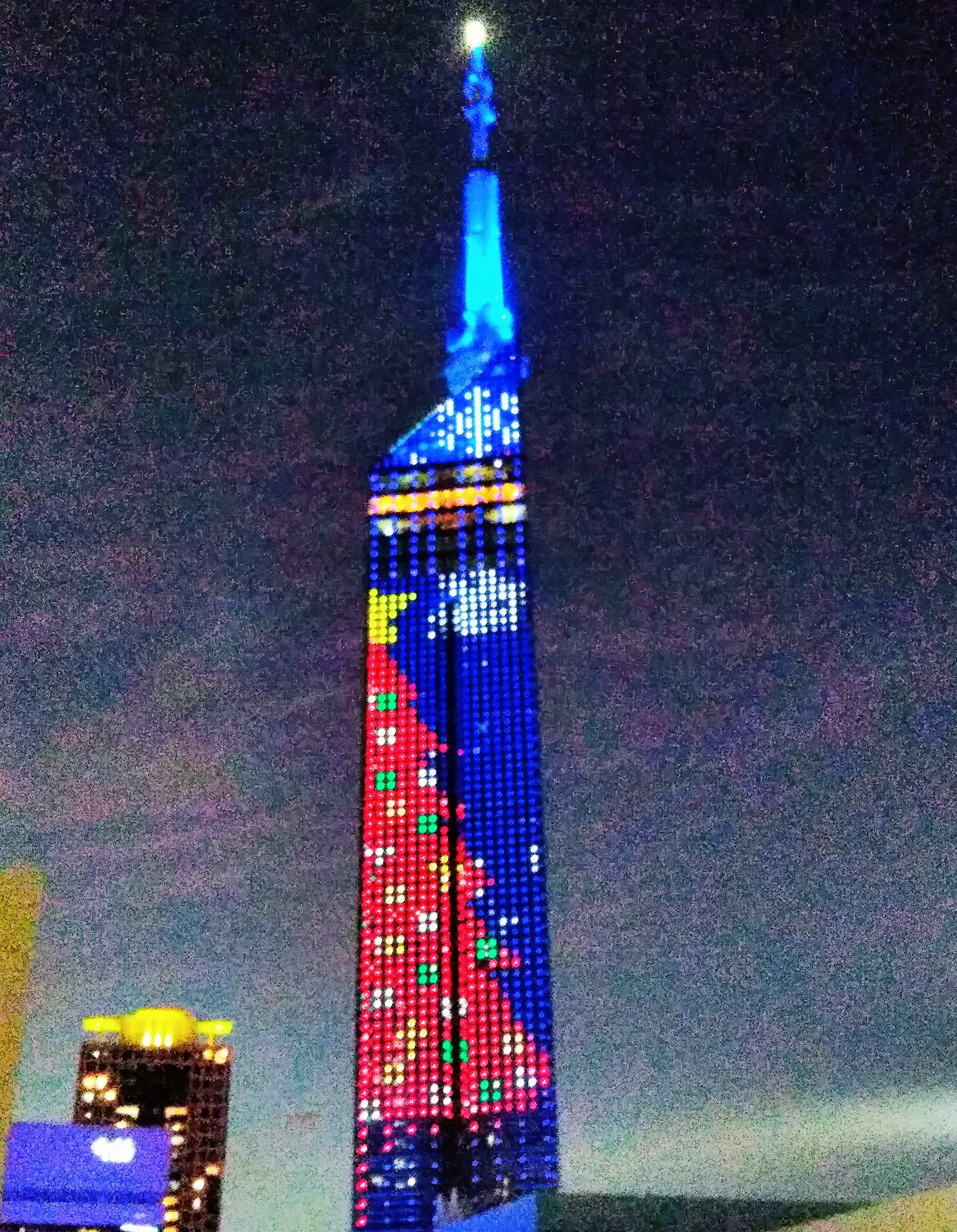
2018 Christmas illumination

== See also ==
- List of tallest structures in Japan
