= Godfrey Lewis Rockefeller =

American farmer and businessman (1783–1857)

- Born: September 24, 1783; Albany, New York, U.S.
- Died: September 28, 1857 (aged 74); Richford, New York, U.S.
- Occupations: Farmer, plantation owner and businessman
- Spouse: Lucy Avery (m. 1806)
- Children: 10 (including William Rockefeller Sr.)
- Parent(s): William Rockefeller; Christina Rockefeller
- Relatives: See Rockefeller family

Godfrey Lewis Rockefeller (September 24, 1783 – September 28, 1857), was an American farmer and businessman. He was an early settler of Richford, New York, and his personal characteristics have led him to be called "a most unlikely progenitor of the clan". He was the father of con artist William Rockefeller Sr., and grandfather of John D. Rockefeller.

== Early life and marriage ==
Godfrey Rockefeller was born September 24, 1783, in Albany, New York. His parents were William (1750–1793) and Christina (1754–1800) Rockefeller. William and Christina were third cousins; William's grandfather was Johann Peter Rockefeller then John Peter Rockefeller, a miller who migrated in 1708 from Rockenfeld, Wied-Neuwied, Rhineland, Germany, to Philadelphia where he was a plantation owner and landholder in Somerville, New Jersey, and Amwell, New Jersey. Christina's grandfather was Johann Peter's cousin, Diell Rockefeller, who immigrated to Germantown, New York. On November 20, 1806 in Livingston, New York, Godfrey married former schoolteacher Lucy Avery (Great Barrington, Massachusetts, February 11, 1786 – Richford, New York, April 6, 1867) against opposition from her parents Miles Avery (Norwich, Connecticut, September 5, 1760 – Great Barrington, Massachusetts, June 27, 1830) and wife (Great Barrington, Massachusetts, November 1783) Melinda Pixley (Great Barrington, Massachusetts, August 4, 1764 – Great Barrington, Massachusetts, October 1, 1827). Lucy Avery's ancestors were Puritans who had emigrated from Devon, England, to Salem, Massachusetts, in about 1630.

Godfrey was said to be outmatched by his wife, who was taller, more confident, and better educated than Godfrey. Godfrey himself was said to have a "stunted, impoverished look and a hangdog air of perpetual defeat". He was also said to be jovial and good-natured, but his propensity to drink upset his wife. The pair would have ten children.

== Career ==
Godfrey and Lucy first lived in Great Barrington, where Godfrey became sheriff, and worked as a farmer and businessman with little success. He and his young family moved from Great Barrington to Granger, New York, and then to Ancram, New York, and then to Livingston, New York. Between 1832 and 1834, the family moved by Conestoga wagon west. Various reasons for this move have been given. One account is that Godfrey and several neighbors lost their land in a title dispute. Another is that Godfrey traded his farm for a farm in Tioga County, a trade which Godfrey would have been ill-advised to make as the farm at his final destination had thin acidic soil that was poor for farming. Another is that the family intended to move to Michigan, but Lucy preferred the New England culture of upstate New York. Whatever the reason, they spent two weeks along the Albany-Catskill turnpike with nine of their ten children (all excepting William) travelling to their new home, a sparsely populated wilderness near Richford, New York. A family legend is that from the top of the hill on his new, 60-acre property, Godfrey said that "This is as close as we shall ever get to Michigan", and therefore named the spot, Michigan Hill. At Michigan Hill, Lucy built a stone fence with two field-hands, and the family worked a farm. Their son, William, arrived in Richford in about 1835.

== Death and family ==
Godfrey Lewis Rockefeller died on September 28, 1857, and Lucy died April 6, 1867, both in Richford, New York. Godfrey and Lucy had 10 children:

- Melinda Rockefeller (September 12, 1807 – May 2, 1880), married to William Harris
- Olymphia Rockefeller (April 20, 1809 – July 21, 1893),
- William Avery "Bill" Rockefeller Sr. (November 13, 1810 – May 11, 1906). His son John Davison Rockefeller Sr. founded the Standard Oil Company in 1870.
- Norman Rockefeller (October 27, 1812 – January 20, 1905)
- Sally Ann Rockefeller (September 28, 1814 – March 3, 1884)
- Jacob S. Rockefeller (July 14, 1816 – August 14, 1892)
- Mary Rockefeller (February 18, 1819 – July 15, 1819)
- Miles Avery Rockefeller (July 27, 1821 – ?)
- Mary Miranda Rockefeller (June 17, 1824 – November 12, 1879)
- Egbert Rockefeller (February 8, 1827 – September 20, 1878).

== Sources ==
- Chernow, Ron. Titan: The Life of John D. Rockefeller, Sr. Vintage, 2007.
- Flynn, John T. God's gold: The story of Rockefeller and his times. Ludwig von Mises Institute, 1933.
- Nevins, Allan. John D. Rockefeller The Heroic Age Of American Enterprise. C Scribner's Sons, 1940.
- Sweet, Homer De Lois, The Averys of Groton: Genealogical and Biographical, Volume 2, Rice-Taylor Publishing, 1894
- Henry Oscar Rockefeller, Benjamin Franklin Rockefeller, The Transactions of the Rockefeller Family Association, Rockefeller Family Association, 1915, pages 43–47
- Peter Collier and David Horowitz, The Rockefellers: An American Dynasty, Holt, Rinehart and Winston, 1976, page 7
- Thomas Shannon, A Trip to the Forgotten Birthplace of American History's Richest Man, Hudson River Zeitgeist, July 3, 2016
