= Frank Rockefeller =

American businessman from New York (1845–1917)

- Rockefeller c. 1905
- Born: Franklin Rockefeller; August 8, 1845; Moravia, New York, US
- Died: April 17, 1917 (aged 71); Cleveland, Ohio, US
- Occupation: Business executive
- Parent(s): William Avery "Bill" Rockefeller and Eliza Davison

Franklin "Frank" Rockefeller (August 8, 1845 – April 15, 1917) was an American businessman and member of the prominent Rockefeller family. He was the youngest brother of John D. Rockefeller.

== Early life ==
Rockefeller and his younger twin sister Frances, who died young, were born on August 8, 1845, in Moravia, New York, the youngest children of William Avery "Bill" Rockefeller, businessman, lumberman, herbalist and conartist, and Eliza Davison Rockefeller (née Davison; 1813–1889). His two older brothers were Standard Oil co-founders John Davison Rockefeller and William Avery Rockefeller Jr.

Rockefeller's early years were spent in Richford, New York. With his father, he moved to Cleveland, Ohio, which would be the home base of his business endeavors.

== Career ==
In September 1861, while still underage, he joined the 7th Ohio Infantry and participated as an infantryman in the battles of Winchester, Port Republic, Cedar Mountain, Chancellorsville, Gettysburg, Lookout Mountain, and other battles including Sherman's march to Atlanta. He was wounded in the head by grape shot at Chancellorsville.

He held various jobs in Cleveland, eventually becoming involved in his brothers' Standard Oil Co. Frank became one of the principal promoters of the company, and later served as its vice president. However, Rockefeller fell out with his brothers and left Standard Oil in 1898. The rift was caused by John D. not taking consideration of Frank's other interests in the Pioneer Oil Company, and quarrels with Frank's partner, James Corrigan, with whom he owned the Franklin Mine near Lake Superior. He moved with his family to a large ranch in Kansas, but he later returned to Ohio. The 8,000-acre ranch stood on a large tract of cheap land in Belvidere, Kansas, west of Wichita (originally spotted by his father on his travels). The property was remote from railroads, and his cattle could graze on vast, unfenced plains. Eventually the Atchison, Topeka and Santa Fe Railroad brought in fresh settlers shrinking the free range for cattlemen. This ruined the ranch for breeding beef, and Frank tried futilely to sell the depreciated property.

Frank formed a business relationship with Feargus B. Squire and Herman Frasch, acquiring a three-tenths interest in the Frasch Process. All three then entered into a 50-50 agreement with the American Sulphur Company to form the Union Sulphur Company.

Frank was not as suited to business as his brothers. He invested around $500,000 in mining ventures, which proved unsound, and also invested $250,000 in unfruitful commercial paper. Frank found stability when he invested in the Buckeye Steel Castings Company of Columbus in 1892. He became president of the company in 1905, and served in that capacity until 1908, when the presidency was assumed by Samuel Prescott Bush. Frank Rockefeller continued as vice president of the company.

Frank Rockefeller refused to speak to his brothers John and William Jr. until his death, despite William attempting reconciliation in the summer of 1916. Frank said later that year "There's not the slightest possibility of a reconciliation." Frank died the following year. His funeral was held on April 17, 1917, at the home of Mrs. Walter S. Bowler. The funeral was attended by his brothers, John and William, the former being described in the press as "looking tired and careworn."

== Personal life ==
In 1870, Rockefeller married Helen Elizabeth Scofield, a daughter of William Charles Scofield and Ann Scofield (née Barker) both of Cleveland, Ohio. The Scofield family was prominent in business in Ohio. They had five children.

- Alice Maude Rockefeller (1871–1942)
- Anna Beatrice Rockefeller (1875–1965), married William Fowler Nash (1870–1958), a vice president of Cleveland Provision Company, which was founded by his father. They had three children.
- William Scofield Rockefeller (1877–1878), died in childbed.
- Helen Effie Rockefeller (1880–1960), married Walter Scott Bowler (1872–1927). They had one son.
- Myra Rockefeller (1884–1886), died

Rockefeller died on April 17, 1917, in Cleveland, Ohio aged 71.
