= Columbus Castings =

American manufacturer

Buckeye Steel Castings was a steel manufacturer based in Columbus, Ohio best known for its longtime president, Samuel P. Bush, the grandfather of President George H. W. Bush and great-grandfather of President George W. Bush.

Buckeye, named for the Ohio Buckeye tree, was founded in Columbus as the Murray-Hayden Foundry, which originally produced iron farm implements. After Finding success in manufacturing iron railroad car couplers, the company changed its name to the Buckeye Automatic Car Coupler Company in 1891 and later to the Buckeye Malleable Iron and Coupler Company in 1894. Growing demand for stronger coupling assemblies eventually led to a transition to steel production and the adoption of the name Buckeye Steel Castings.

The business was closely associated with rail baron E.H. Harriman, and for some time, was controlled by Frank Rockefeller, the brother of oil magnate John D. Rockefeller. In 1901, Buckeye hired Samuel Prescott "S.P." Bush as general manager. Bush. A graduate of Stevens Institute of Technology, Bush had advanced from apprentice mechanic at the locally based Pittsburgh, Cincinnati, Chicago and St. Louis Railroad to superintendent of motive power at that railroad, and, briefly, the Milwaukee Road.

In 1908, following Rockefeller's departure, Bush became president, a position he held until 1928. During this tenure, he gained recognition as a leading industrialist and exercised political influence in Washington, D.C.

Bush had a progressive business outlook for his time and implemented many modern management practices, along with a notably generous working environment.

In 1967, the parent company Buckeye International, Inc. was established and was later acquired in 1980 by Worthington Industries through a stock merger. Worthington sold Buckeye Steel in 1999, and the company filed for bankruptcy in 2002.

Following the bankruptcy, former Worthington president Donald Malenick led an investment group that purchased Buckeye’s assets and reopened the business as Columbus Steel Castings. The company again closed after filing for bankruptcy in 2016.

== See also ==
- Janney coupler
