= William Rockefeller Sr. =

American con artist (1810–1906)

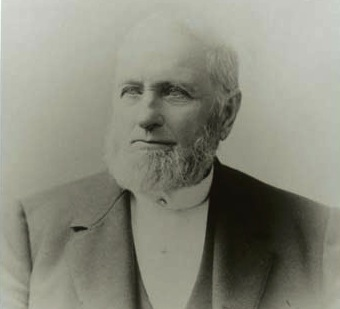
- Born: William Avery Rockefeller; November 13, 1810; Ancram, New York, U.S.
- Died: May 11, 1906 (aged 95); Freeport, Illinois, U.S.
- Burial place: Oakland Cemetery (Buried as William Levingston)
- Other name: Dr. William Levingston
- Occupations: Businessman, Lumberman, Herbalist, "Snake Oil" Salesman
- Spouse(s): Eliza Davison (m. 1837–1889; her death, separated c. 1855); Margaret Allen (m. 1856–1906; his death)
- Partner: Nancy Brown
- Children: Lucy, Clorinda, John, Cornelia, William Jr., Mary, Franklin, and Frances
- Parent(s): Godfrey Lewis Rockefeller; Lucy Avery
- Relatives: See Rockefeller family

William Avery "Devil Bill" Rockefeller Sr. (November 13, 1810 – May 11, 1906) was an American businessman, lumberman, herbalist, salesman, and con artist who went by the alias of Dr. William Levingston. He worked as a lumberman and then a traveling salesman who identified himself as a "botanic physician" and sold elixirs. He was known to buy and sell horses, and was also known at one point to have bought a barge-load of salt in Syracuse. Land speculation was another type of his business, and the selling of elixirs served to keep him with cash and aided in his scouting of land deals. He loaned money to farmers at twelve percent, but tried to lend to farmers who could not pay so as to foreclose and take the farms. Two of his sons were Standard Oil co-founders John Davison Rockefeller Sr. and William Avery Rockefeller Jr.

== Family ==
William Avery Rockefeller was born in Ancram, New York. He was the eldest son of businessman and farmer Godfrey Lewis Rockefeller and Lucy Avery. Godfrey and Lucy had married on September 20, 1806, in Amwell, New Jersey. Bill had two elder sisters, Melinda and Olympia, as well as seven younger siblings: Norman, Sally, Jacob, Mary, Miles, Mary Miranda, and Egbert.

== Ancestry ==
The Rockefellers trace their patrilineal line to Goddard Rockefeller (born Gotthard Rockenfeller; 1590) of Fahr, Germany, and the now deserted village of Rockenfeld as namesake. The first Rockefeller to emigrate to America (1723) was Johann Peter Rockenfeller (1710 – 1787), who changed his name to Rockefeller. Godfrey Lewis Rockefeller was a son of distant cousins William Rockefeller (1750–1793) and Christina Rockefeller (1754–1800). Lucy Avery was born to Miles Avery and Melinda Pixley, New England Yankees of mostly English descent, being a descendant of James Avery.

== Marriage and children ==
Rockefeller married his first wife, Eliza Davison, on February 18, 1837 in Niles, New York. Rockefeller met Eliza on one of his business trips in Upstate New York. It is said that Rockefeller pulled out a slate and chalk to communicate when he arrived at the Davison residence, as he often pretended to be deaf and dumb on his selling trips. Eliza is to have supposedly remarked, "If that man were not deaf and dumb, I'd marry him."

The couple had three sons and three daughters:

- Lucy Rockefeller (1838–1878), married Pierson Briggs
- John Davison Rockefeller Sr. (1839–1937), married Laura Celestia "Cettie" Spelman
- William Avery Rockefeller Jr. (1841–1922), married Almira Geraldine Goodsell
- Mary Ann Rockefeller (1843–1925), married William Cullen Rudd Sr.
- Franklin "Frank" Rockefeller (1845–1917) [twin]
- Frances Rockefeller (1845–1847) [twin]

Bill once bragged, "I cheat my boys every chance I get. I want to make 'em sharp." Although Bill abandoned the family while Lucy, John, and William Jr. were teenagers, he remained legally married to Eliza until her death. In 1856, having assumed the name Dr. William Levingston, he married Margaret Allen in Norwich, Ontario, Canada. Bill and Margaret had no children together. Before leaving his first wife, he also had two daughters with his mistress and housekeeper Nancy Brown:

- Clorinda Rockefeller (c. 1838–?, died young)
- Cornelia Rockefeller (c. 1840–?)

Before marrying Eliza, Bill had been in love with Nancy. However, he ended up marrying Eliza since her father was to give her $500 when she married, and Nancy was poor.

When John D. Rockefeller started his own produce commission business with Maurice B. Clark in 1859, Clark initiated the idea of the partnership and offered $2,000 towards the goal. John D. Rockefeller had only $800 saved up at the time and so borrowed $1,000 from his father, "Big Bill" Rockefeller, at 10 percent interest. This loan was a crucial point of John's career, allowing him enough money to build his own wealth, eventually leading to his ability to buy equity in larger quantities.

Bill visited with his grandchildren at the Forest Hill estate in Cleveland and at Pocantico Hills in Tarrytown. He taught his grandchildren how to shoot and played fiddle in the evenings for them. Prior to Bill's visits, John D. would invite some of Bill's Upstate New York relatives and friends.

== Scandal ==
On July 26, 1849, in the city of Auburn, New York, William was indicted for a rape which had occurred at gunpoint. His victim had worked in the Rockefeller household; her name was Ann Vanderbeak. In the 1905 book Memoirs of an American Citizen, Robert Herrick says an improper relationship had been rumoured to exist.

The court document reads, "That William A. Rockefeller late of the Town of Moravia in the County of Cayuga, on the first day of May in the year of the Lord one thousand eight hundred and forty eight, with force and arms at the Town of Moravia in said County, in and upon one Ann Vanderbeak in the Peace of God with the People of the State of New York then and there being, violently did make an assault on her, the said Ann Venderbeak, then and there make violently and against her will feloniously did ravish and carnally know […]". William Cooper, the Rockefeller family doctor, was also indicted for assault and battery with the intention of raping Ann Vanderbeak.

Because of the allegations, William sold the Moravia home and moved to Owego, New York, possibly to avoid trial, under the pretence of providing better opportunities for the boys. Four days later, Eliza's father sued Bill in the Supreme Court of Cayuga for failure to pay a $1,175 debt. His plea states that Bill had asked him for help with his bail for the rape charges, but that Eliza's father had not seen Bill since. Eliza also informed authorities that her husband had "absconded and cannot now be found within the state." William assumed the title Doctor Bill Levingston and worked as a travelling snake oil specialist. Although nothing came of the charges, William left the family penniless.

After hearing rumours that John D. Rockefeller—then the richest man in the world at the height of his fame—had a shameful family secret, the press went into a frenzy. Joseph Pulitzer offered a reward of $8,000 for information about "Doc Rockefeller," who was known to be alive and living under a false name, but whose whereabouts were a family secret. Despite slender clues picked up from interviews with family members and an 18-month search, the journalists failed to track him down before he died. The full story was not exposed until two years later.

== Death ==
Rockefeller had spent some time in Park River, North Dakota under the Levingston alias. He died on May 11, 1906, in Freeport, Illinois, at the age of 95. He was buried there in Oakland Cemetery. John D. Rockefeller never publicly acknowledged the truth about his father's life as a bigamist, and the cost for Bill's grave marker was paid by the second wife's estate.

== Sources ==
- Chernow, Ron (May 5, 1998). Titan: The Life of John D. Rockefeller Sr. Random House. ISBN 978-0-679-43808-3.
- Hawke, David Freeman (1980). John D. The Founding Father of the Rockefellers. Harper & Row. ISBN 978-0060118136.
- Segall, Grant (February 8, 2001). John D. Rockefeller: Anointed With Oil. Oxford University Press. ISBN 978-0-19512147-6.
