= Richford, New York =

Richford
- Town
- Location within the state of New York
- Coordinates: 42°21′20″N 76°12′3″W
- Country: United States
- State: New York
- County: Tioga

Area
  - Total: 38.20 sq mi (98.95 km^{2})
  - Land: 38.19 sq mi (98.90 km^{2})
  - Water: 0.019 sq mi (0.05 km^{2})
- Elevation: 1,371 ft (418 m)

Population (2020)
  - Total: 1,043
  - Estimate (2022): 1,020
  - Density: 27.3/sq mi (10.5/km^{2})
- Time zone: UTC-5 (Eastern (EST))
  - Summer (DST): UTC-4 (EDT)
- ZIP code: 13835
- Area code: 607
- FIPS code: 36-61511
- GNIS feature ID: 0979418
- Website: https://richfordny.com/

Richford is a town in Tioga County, New York, United States. The population was 1,043 at the 2020 census. The town is named after Ezekial Rich, an early settler and benefactor of the town.

The Town of Richford is the northernmost town in the county and is southeast of Ithaca. It is known as the birthplace of Oil titan, philanthropist, founder of the Standard Oil company, and the richest man in modern history, John D. Rockefeller, who was born in this town and returned to visit during the summer. The foundation of his childhood home is located adjacent to Rockefeller Road on land that is now part of Griggs Gulf State Forest. It is marked by a sign that designates the historical site.

== History ==
European-American settlement began around 1808 when Evan Harris brought his family here. Samuel Smith was the first to settle within the present village site in 1813. The first tavern was built in the village in 1817 at the site of the Richford Hotel (now the Richford Quickway) by Beriah Wells. Ezekial Rich moved to the town in 1821 when he purchased the tavern from Beriah Wells. He established a glove and mitten factory, and later opened a general store. The town was first formed from the Town of Berkshire as the "Town of Arlington" in 1831. In 1832 it changed its name to the Town of Richford.

Local oral history links several properties in Richford with the Underground Railroad in the antebellum period, by which residents aided refugee slaves to reach freedom.

In 1816, the Catskill Turnpike was brought through the village on its route to Ithaca and generated considerable traffic to the village. This was the dominant route into or out of the village until 1869, when the Southern Central Railroad was completed between Auburn and Owego.

== Geography ==
According to the United States Census Bureau, the town has a total area of 38.2 square miles (99 km^{2}), of which 38.2 square miles (99 km^{2}) is land and 0.04 square miles (0.10 km^{2}) (0.05%) is water.

The West Branch of the Owego Creek forms the western border of the town while the East Branch runs along the eastern edge of the village itself at the base of Geer Hill. Several spring-fed ponds exist on the hilltops, especially at Clarks.

A large portion of the town is hilly, with many of the highest elevations (+1,400 ft) in the county. The highest elevation (1,994 ft) in Tioga County is within the town, an unnamed hill just to the north of the intersection of Creamery Rd and Robinson Hollow Rd in Robinson Hollow State Forest.

Richford lies on the southern edge of the snowbelt, averaging 82 inches (210 cm). It receives 40 inches (1,000 mm) of rain, and has, on average, 154 sunny days per year.

The western border is with Tompkins County. The north border is Cortland County, and the eastern border is Broome County. Berkshire lies to the south.

New York State Route 38 (north-south) intersects New York State Route 79 (east-west) at Richford village.

== Demographics ==
Historical population
Census	Pop.	Note	%±
1840	939		—
1850	1,208		28.6%
1860	1,404		16.2%
1870	1,434		2.1%
1880	1,477		3.0%
1890	1,267		−14.2%
1900	1,142		−9.9%
1910	925		−19.0%
1920	831		−10.2%
1930	805		−3.1%
1940	794		−1.4%
1950	787		−0.9%
1960	804		2.2%
1970	916		13.9%
1980	906		−1.1%
1990	1,153		27.3%
2000	1,170		1.5%
2010	1,172		0.2%
2020	1,043		−11.0%
2022 (est.)	1,020		−2.2%
U.S. Decennial Census

As of the census of 2000, there were 1,170 people, 440 households, and 315 families residing in the town. The population density was 30.7 inhabitants per square mile (11.9/km^{2}). There were 502 housing units at an average density of 13.2 per square mile (5.1/km^{2}). The racial makeup of the town was 98.89% White, 0.17% African American, 0.09% Native American, 0.09% Pacific Islander, and 0.77% from two or more races. Hispanic or Latino of any race were 0.77% of the population.

There were 440 households, out of which 34.8% had children under the age of 18 living with them, 53.2% were married couples living together, 12.3% had a female householder with no husband present, and 28.4% were non-families. 22.3% of all households were made up of individuals, and 8.6% had someone living alone who was 65 years of age or older. The average household size was 2.66 and the average family size was 3.09.

In the town, the population was spread out, with 27.9% under the age of 18, 7.5% from 18 to 24, 30.9% from 25 to 44, 23.8% from 45 to 64, and 9.8% who were 65 years of age or older. The median age was 37 years. For every 100 females, there were 97.0 males. For every 100 females age 18 and over, there were 100.2 males.

The median income for a household in the town was $34,130, and the median income for a family was $38,750. Males had a median income of $28,661 versus $23,667 for females. The per capita income for the town was $15,331. About 12.4% of families and 13.8% of the population were below the poverty line, including 18.5% of those under age 18 and 7.3% of those age 65 or over.

== Recreation ==
=== Annual Potato Festival ===
Named in honor of the Clarks Seed Farm, this festival is held annually on the third Saturday of September to celebrate the significance of potato farming in Richford's history. Arts and crafts vendors are available as are games and races. The event is known for its potato-themed dishes, including potato ice-cream. This used to be made by Cornell University dairy and featured chocolate-covered potato sticks in vanilla ice cream. Now Jones' Humdinger makes two varieties: the original and a mashed sweet potato-based version.

=== Broome-Tioga Sports Center ===
An AMA and Non-AMA sanctioned Off Road Racing Facility is located on the border with Broome County. The track hosts several types of events, including Motorcycle, Snowmobile and ATV/UTV races. It also features Mud Bogs, Mud Drags, Hill climbs, and demolition derbies, ATV and UTV Racing, a Trail Riding facility, and classic car shows.

=== State lands ===
Richford has more than 4,700 acres (19 km^{2}) designated as state lands, more than all other towns in Tioga County combined; these properties are mostly contained in six large state forests.

State Forests in Richford

- Michigan Hill State Forest: Located east of the village and north of RT 79. Encompasses 1,200 acres (4.9 km^{2}) of wilderness area. There are no maintained trails. In several areas along Rockefeller Road, the ruins of old settlements and farms can be found, usually consisting of old foundations and orchards. The occasional uncovered well exists.
- Griggs Gulf State Forest: Located adjacent to Michigan Hill State Forest, the forest encompasses 2,365 acres (9.57 km^{2}) shared between Tioga and Cortland counties, with more than 2.7 miles (4.3 km) of ungroomed trails. John D Rockefeller's birthplace is within Griggs Gulf Forest on Rockefeller Rd. An unkempt nature trail built by a local 4-H group begins here and passes several old structures, including a mill and other foundations.
- Turkey Hill State Forest: Shared with the town of Berkshire, this forest is located east and south of Richford. It consists of 1,100 acres (4.5 km^{2}) of primitive woodlands with only 1.3 miles (2.1 km) of public access road. Extensive damage in the 2003 ice storms resulted in large areas of early successional habitats that foster a wide variety of birds and other woodland creatures.
- Robinson Hollow State Forest: 1,400 acres (5.7 km^{2}) just west of Richford. Many recreational facilities exist including 1.5 miles (2.4 km) of marked trails maintained by local associations. A portion of the Finger Lakes Trail runs through the forest. The Kimmee lean-to, maintained by the Finger Lakes Trail Conference, is located here. The forest includes a 45-acre (180,000 m^{2}) trout pond, and extensive fishing areas are located along the West Branch Owego Creek. Many of the highest elevations in the county are within the forest, including the highest.
- Beaver Dam State Forest: 1,150 acres (4.7 km^{2}) east of Richford on the border of Tioga and Broome counties. Contains 1.8 miles (2.9 km) of maintained trails and a 1.5-mile (2.4 km) public access road.
- Andersen Hill State Forest: 544 acres (2.20 km^{2}) just south of the village proper, west of Rt 38. The forest consists of managed woodlands that maintain a mix of early, mid, and late successional forests. A short (.5 mile) maintained trail exists that connects to a larger trail network in adjacent lands, and a 1.6-mile (2.6 km) forest access road is available. An access point to the West Branch Owego Creek is maintained within the forest.

The numerous state-owned lands are often utilised for hiking and motorized sports activities. Many 4-wheeler and snowmobile tracks cross the woodlands on both state and private land.

Fishing sites are available in Richford. Native and stocked trout live in the cold waters of both branches of the Owego Creek, with areas located in and near Richford. The NYSDEC annually releases over 10,000 brown trout into both branches in Richford. Additionally, 200 rainbow trout are released into the Tri-County Pond.

Hunting is also popular within the town. All state lands are open to hunting. They provide excellent habitats to large populations of deer, turkey, and other game animals.

== Communities and locations in the Town of Richford ==
- Dunhamville – A former location, south of Richford village.
- East Richford – A location on NY-79 (Catskill Turnpike), east of Richford village.
- Hubby Creek – A small stream flowing out from the southern part of the town.
- Richford – A hamlet at the junction of NY- 38 and NY-79 in the southwestern part of the town. The East Branch of Owego Creek flows past the village.

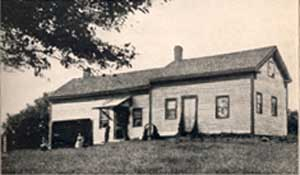
The birthplace of John D. Rockefeller; now only the foundation of the house remains.

== Notable people ==
- John D. Rockefeller (July 8, 1839 – May 23, 1937)
- Gurdon Wattles (May 12, 1855 - January 31, 1932), known for bankrolling much of early Hollywood, was born in Richford in 1855. He moved to Glidden, Iowa following the Civil War.
