= Helen Damrosch Tee-Van =

20th century German-American scientific illustrator

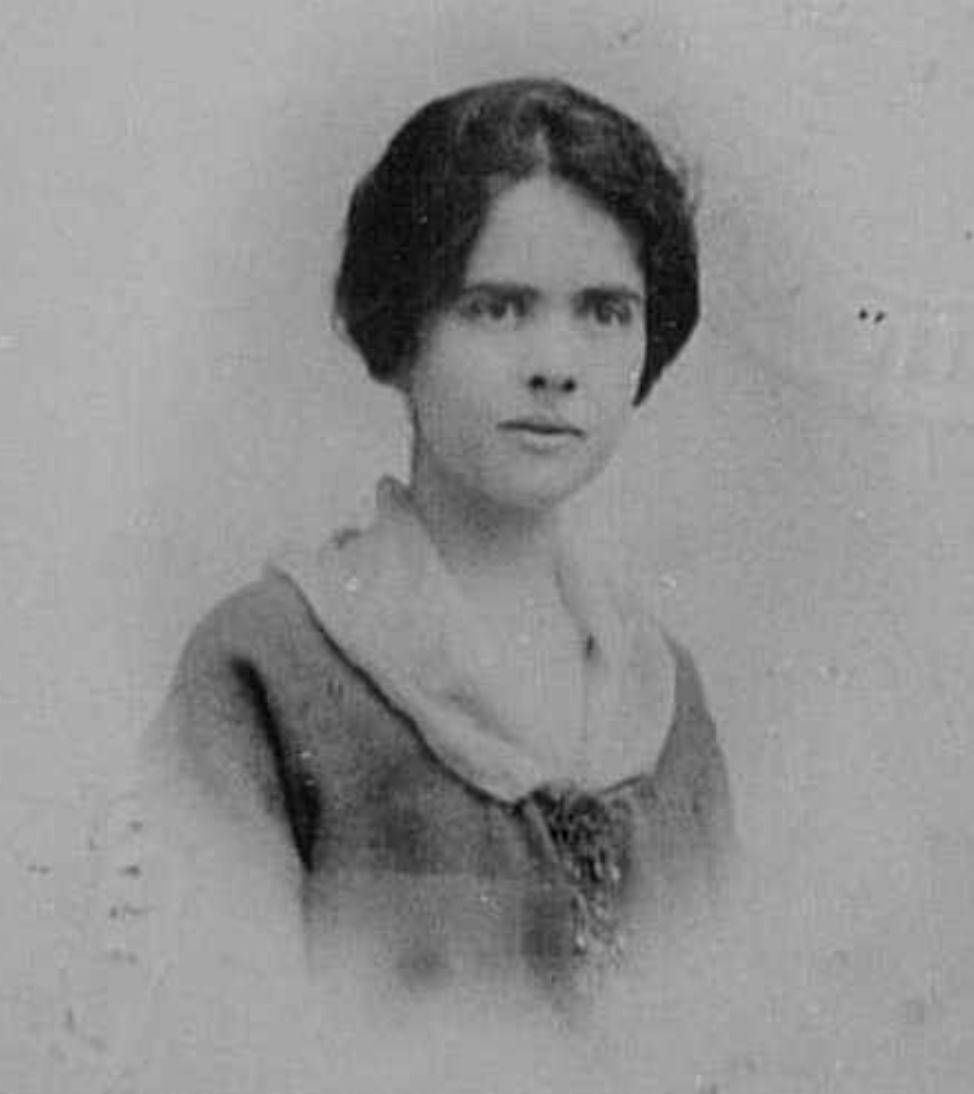
- Passport photo, 1924.
- Born: Helen Therese Damrosch; May 26, 1893; Manhattan, New York, United States
- Died: July 29, 1976 (aged 83); Danbury, Connecticut, United States
- Burial place: Coburn Cemetery; 41.5441273°N 73.4951024°W
- Education: Veltin School for Girls; New York School of Display Design
- Employer: Wildlife Conservation Society
- Spouse: John Tee-Van
- Parents: Frank Damrosch (father); Henrietta Monsenthal (mother)
- Relatives: Leopold Damrosch (grandfather); Walter Damrosch (uncle); Clara Mannes (aunt); Frank Damrosch Jr. (brother)

Helen Damrosch Tee-Van (May 26, 1893 – July 29, 1976) was a German-American illustrator best known for her precise scientific illustrations. Between 1922 and 1963, she participated in 13 international expeditions with the New York Zoological Society (Wildlife Conservation Society) to document new species. Most notably, the illustrator was part of the Arcturus expedition, the organization's first oceanographic expedition, led by William Beebe.

== Biography ==
Helen Therese Damrosch was born in Manhattan to Frank Damrosch and Henrietta Mosenthal Damrosch on May 26, 1893. Many close family members on her father's side of the family were already well-known for their music and educational talents at the time of her birth. She was the granddaughter of Leopold Damrosch, a medical doctor turned music conductor and violinist of high esteem who had immigrated to the United States from Germany with his children in 1871. She was also the niece of both Walter Damrosch, director of the New York Symphony Orchestra, and Clara Mannes, founder of the Mannes School of Music. Her father was a music educator who founded the Institute of Musical Art – the predecessor of the Juilliard School.

Helen grew up in New York City with one sibling, an older brother named Frank Damrosch, Jr. Frank Jr. eventually became a Reverend, author, and noted figure in the American Anglo-Catholic movement.

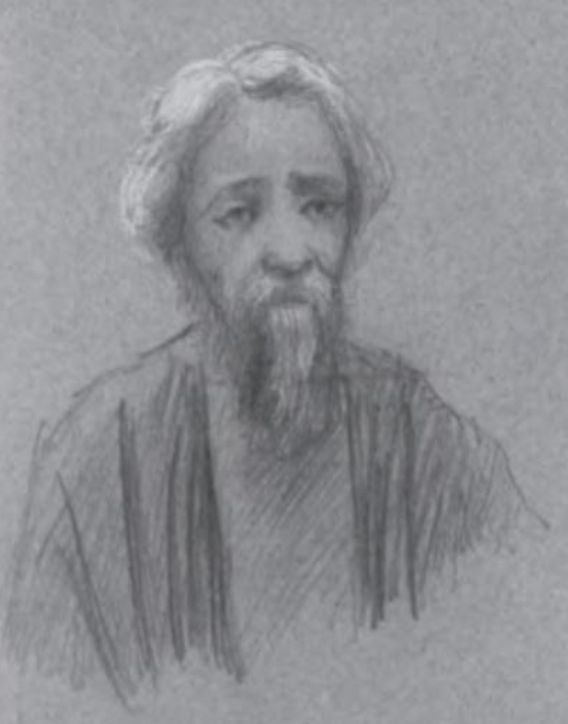
Rabindranath Tagore, pencil sketch, New York City, 1916.

=== Education ===
As a young girl, Helen attended the Veltin School for Girls, where her father and aunt Clara Mannes taught music classes. She dropped out of the school in 1909 when she was sixteen, opting to continue her art education on her terms. During this time, she regularly accompanied a group of students to an anatomy class at Colombia Medical School. For many years she was a member of Jonas Lie's Memory Sketch Club, and she regularly studied under painter George de Forest Brush. In 1916, she attended a lecture given by Nobel Prize-winning poet Rabindranath Tagore on his first world tour. Helen returned to school again much later in life, graduating from the New York School of Display Design in 1937.

=== Marriage ===
Soon after beginning work with the New York Zoological Society, Helen met apprentice zookeeper and ichthyologist John Tee-Van. The couple was married the following year on July 17, 1923, and regularly traveled on scientific expeditions as a pair. John worked his way up the ladder at the Bronx Zoo from apprentice to General Director, eventually holding the top position at the zoo for 10 years. John Tee-Van died in 1967 following a stroke, and Helen never remarried.

In the acknowledgments of her first book written in 1926, Helen cheekily wrote of her ichthyologist husband: "To John Tee-Van, my husband, who has helped in many ways, and has even kept me from such grievous mistakes as putting a forest dragonfly into a picture of an open jungle clearing."

=== Later life ===
At various points throughout her life, Helen was an active member of numerous social groups including the Cosmopolitan Club of New York City, the Society of Animal Artists, the New York Zoological Society, the American Ornithologists' Union, and the China Institute. She was especially involved in the Society of Women Geographers, serving as Vice President and Chair of the New York chapter from 1945 to 1948. She was an official member of the organization from 1934 until 1976.

Helen Damrosch Tee-Van died on July 29, 1976, in a hospital in Danbury, Connecticut when she was 83. She is buried where she spent her retirement, in the town of Sherman, Connecticut.

== Career ==
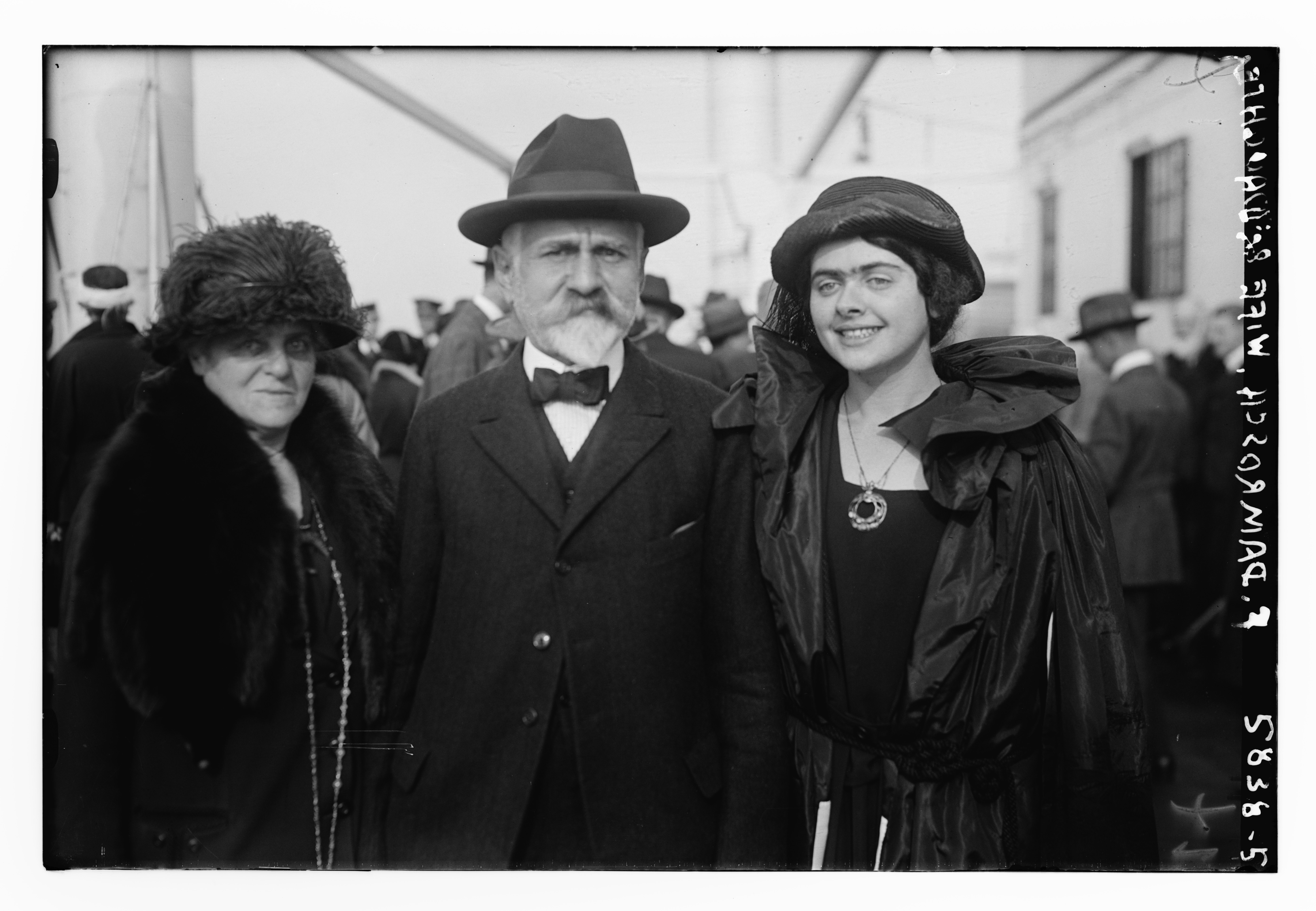
Helen (right) with her parents Henrietta and Frank Damrosch, c. 1920–25.

For 41 years between 1922 and 1963, Helen Damrosch Tee-Van worked as an illustrator for the New York Zoological Society, now known as the Wildlife Conservation Society. In addition to extensive scientific and zoological illustrations, Helen also designed fabrics and textiles. In 1935 and 1936, she served as an organizer for conferences on industrial art offered by the Institute of Women's Professional Relations. She contributed natural history illustrations to both the Collier's Encyclopedia and the Encyclopædia Britannica, the latter of which she is credited with sixteen illustrations in the 14th edition.

During her career, she exhibited her work prolifically, including in exhibitions at the National Academy of Design, the American Museum of Natural History, the Buffalo Museum of Science, the Pennsylvania Academy of the Fine Arts, the Berkshire Museum, and the Gibbs Museum of Charleston. In 1926 Helen exhibited two of her watercolor paintings at the first-ever show of scientific bird illustrations, held at the Los Angeles Museum of History, Science, and Art. Organized by the American Ornithologists' Union', she was lauded for her "exquisite handling of pattern and color details of plumage."

=== Expeditions ===
Helen began working with the Department of Tropical Research of the Wildlife Conservation Society in 1922. Unique for the time, the Department was noted for employing numerous women illustrators and scientists to work on their expeditions. Others employed by the Society at the time included Jocelyn Crane, Gloria Hollister, Harriet Bennett Strandberg, Else Bostelmann, Dwight Franklin, Laura Schlageter, Isabel Cooper Mahaffie, and Ezra Winter. Ruth Rose and Mabel Satterlee also joined them, working as a household manager and a general assistant respectively. Her team of colleagues was unconventional and known for enjoying costume parties and music nights. During two world wars and the Great Depression, Theodore Roosevelt commented that they were fortunate to enjoy their jobs. In a February 20, 1927 article from The Literary Digest detailing the "many odd jobs" held by women, the following was written about Helen.

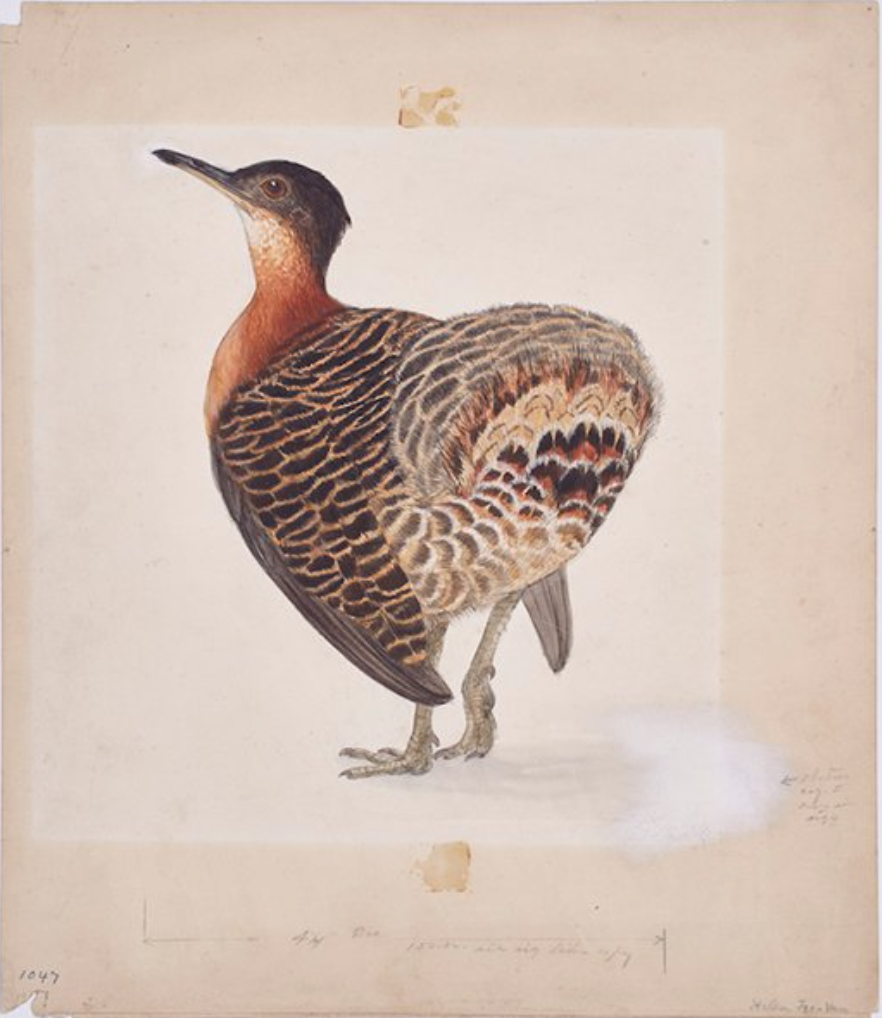
Tinamou, watercolor, Guyana, c. 1922

"Under the sea, Mrs. Helen Damrosch Tee-Van, niece of the famous Conductor Damrosch, finds the subjects she prefers to paint. On excursions with Dr. William Beebe, she paints submarine flora and fauna for scientific record. She feels so at home down below that once she dropped a pencil and reached down for it, only to find it falling up. She had to return to the surface for another. Miss Tee-Van has said the Sargossa, written and illustrated a book about South America, and many of her deep-sea designs are on exhibition in the Metropolitan Museum of Art in New York."

— "Ingenious Women", The Literary Digest

As a scientific illustrator who specialized in animal illustration, Helen accompanied the Department of Tropical Research on thirteen international expeditions under the authority of biologist William Beebe. In 1925, she was one of four women on the Arcturus expedition, along with Ruth Rose, Isabel Cooper, Lillian Segal, and Marie Poland Fish. While on a trip to Haiti in 1927 she became one of the first women to deep-sea dive, wearing a 60-pound diving helmet to make underwater sketches of oceanic organisms on zinc plates. The University of Oregon's archives contains her sketchbooks from British Guiana and Bermuda. Helen Damrosch Tee-Van's expedition résumé included trips to the following locations:

- 1922, 1924: British Guiana
- 1925: Arcturus Oceanographic Expedition (Sargasso Sea to the Galapagos)
- 1927: Haiti
- 1929 – 1933: Bermuda Oceanographic Expeditions
- 1946: Henri Pittier National Park, Venezuela
- 1956, 1960, 1963: Trinidad

=== Displays ===
Helen returned to school as an adult, graduating from the New York School of Display Design in 1937. Both the following year as well as in 1939, she was commissioned to create background murals for exhibits at the Berkshire Museum in Pittsfield, Massachusetts. The Berkshire Museum celebrated its 50th anniversary in 1953 with a lengthy article in the Berkshire Eagle that detailed what were considered the highlights of the museum, including the series of murals completed by Tee-Van, titled The Story of Life. An article written by a curator at the Berkshire Museum and published several years later in the same newspaper echoed a similar sentiment, encouraging visitors to the museum to view Helen's murals on the walls of the Biology room. The mural series was conceived by the director of the museum, Laura M. Bragg, who worked closely with Helen for weeks to fulfill her educational vision.

From 1941 to 1942 and again in 1949, Helen created murals for the backgrounds of animal exhibits at the Bronx Zoo. She also made the background mural for the New York Zoological Society's building at the 1939 World's Fair. Between 1943 and 1947, Helen Damrosch Tee-Van created sixteen educational dioramas for the United Service to China, a group of eight American organizations that sought to fundraise for China and foster relationships between individuals of the two nations.

=== Posthumous controversy ===
For several months in 2017, the Drawing Center in Manhattan mounted an exhibition titled Exploratory Works: Drawings from the Department of Tropical Research Field Expeditions that included works by Helen Damrosch Tee-Van. The exhibit was the first time many of the original illustrations had ever been shown to the public, but it also presented a complex legacy of scientific research, racism, and colonialism.

Decades after she initially drew them, many of Tee-Van's illustrations are now scrutinized for her handling of race. For example, a large map she illustrated of Bermuda's Nonsuch Island while on expedition was featured in the aforementioned 2017 exhibition due to her casual inclusion of several racist, stereotypical caricatures.

== Books ==
In addition to her realistic, scientific illustrations meant for research and natural history purposes, Helen Damrosch Tee-Van also found time to contribute artistically to nearly twenty different books, four of which were her original manuscripts. Helen's work in literature was similar to her scientific work in many ways, as all of her publication credits focus on animals or insects, and feature her accurate depictions of the species they discuss.

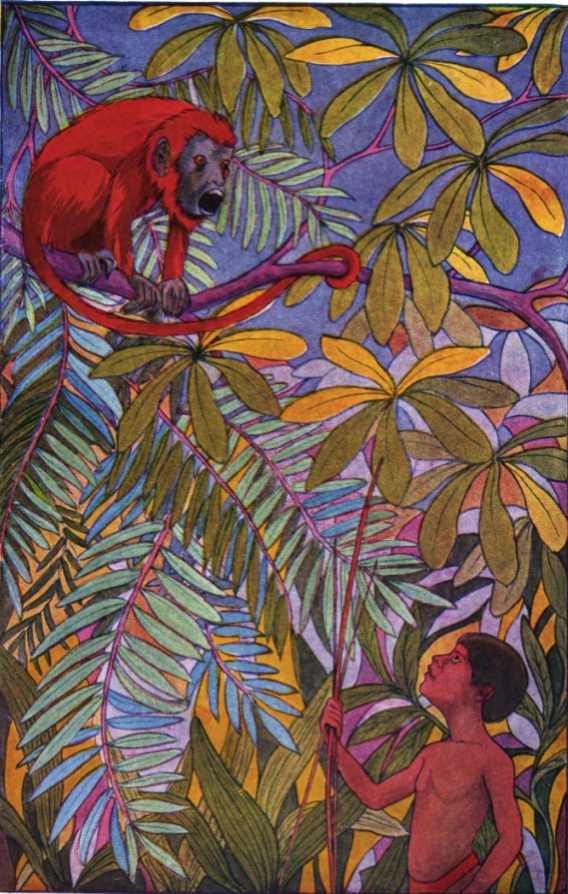
Red Howling Monkey, frontispiece, 1926.

Helen's book illustration career began in 1918 when her father hired her to illustrate a music book that he was publishing for children, titled A Birthday Greeting and Other Songs From Emily Niles Heck. She started working for the New York Zoological Society soon after and didn't seriously return to book illustration until the 1950s when she was well into her 60s. She illustrated several books for previous expedition colleagues, including The Story of the Platypus, Reluctant Farmer, and The Story of the Hippopotamus. Books that contain illustrations that are credited to Helen Damrosch Tee-Van:

- A Birthday Greeting and Other Songs, From Emily Niles Heck, Frank Damrosch, 1918.
- Creative Music in the Home, Satis Coleman, 1927.
- Reluctant Farmer, Elswyth Thane, 1950.
- Mosquitoes in the Big Ditch, Roger Burlingame, 1952.
- Reptiles Round the World, Clifford Pope, 1957.
- Sea Monsters, William Knowlton, 1959.
- The Story of the Platypus, Alfred G. Milotte, 1959.
- Imported Insects, Naomi Talley, 1961.
- The Story of the Hippopotamus, Alfred G. Milotte, 1964.
- The Story of an Alaskan Grizzly, Alfred G. and Emma Milotte, 1969.

=== Original titles ===
Helen Damrosch Tee-Van's first original book, Red Howling Monkey: The Tale of a South American Indian Boy, was published by MacMillan Company in 1926. The book was quickly popular among children and parents, earning a glowing review from a journal published by the National Council of Teachers of English called The Elementary English Review. The final three of Helen's four children's books, those written and illustrated in the 1960s, were storybooks that doubled as flora and fauna guides for young explorers. Helen died while working on her final book, leaving her manuscript for Nature's Protection of the Animal Kingdom permanently unpublished. A complete list of original books written and illustrated by Helen Damrosch Tee-Van includes:

- Red Howling Monkey: The Tale of a South American Indian Boy, 1926.
- The Trees Around Us, 1960.
- Insects Are Where You Find Them, 1963.
- Small Animals Are Where You Find Them, 1966.
- Nature's Protection of the Animal Kingdom, unpublished.

== Collections ==
The University of Oregon holds the Helen Damrosch Tee-Van papers, a large collection of her letters and sketches. The collection also includes the original art from thirteen of the books she illustrated, including Red Howling Monkey, The Story of an Alaskan Grizzly, and the unpublished book she was working on at the time of her death – Nature's Protection of the Animal Kingdom. In addition to these original illustrations, the University also holds twenty-six of Tee-Van's sketchbooks dated from 1900 to 1929.

The Wildlife Conservation Society is currently in the lengthy process of digitizing thousands of their employee's original illustrations. As of 2022, over eight hundred images credited to Helen Damrosch Tee-Van have been uploaded to the online archive.

- Textile sample, silk, ca. 1927, Metropolitan Museum of Art.
- Helen Damrosch Tee-Van papers, 1900–1969, University of Oregon.
- Damrosch-Tee-Van collection, 1856–1969, Library of Congress.
- Mannes-Damrosch collection, 1848–1986, Library of Congress.
- Digital Collection of Tropical Research Illustrations, Wildlife Conservation Society.
