= Isabel Cooper =

American artist (1892–1984)

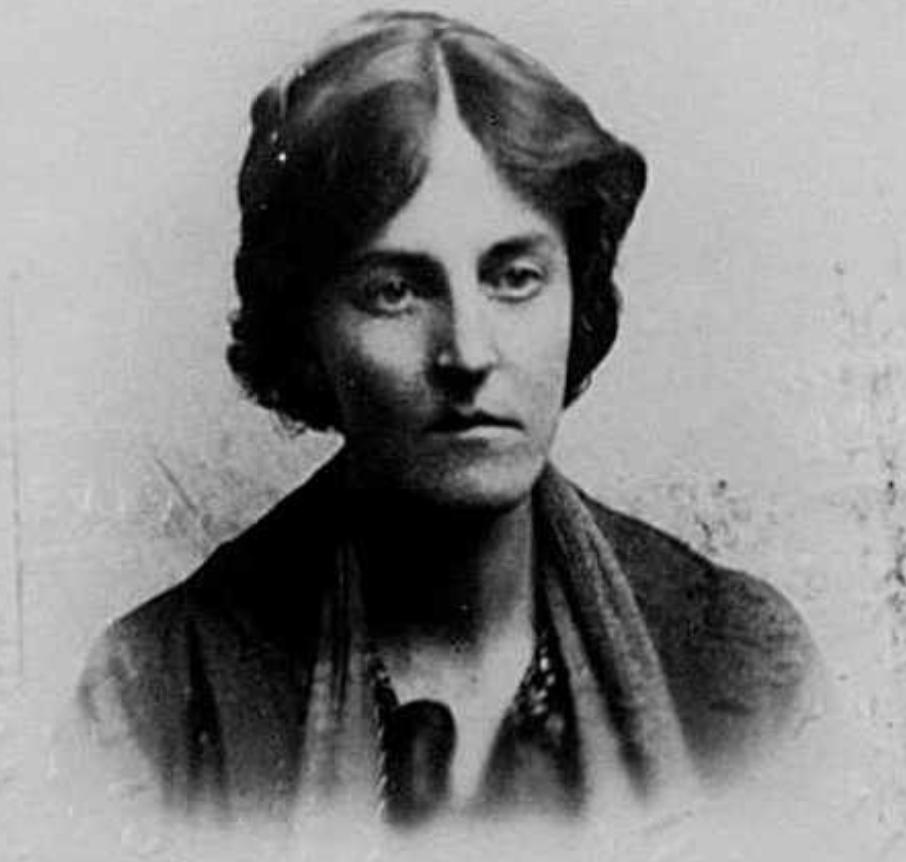
- Passport photo
- Born: August 22, 1892; Tacoma, Washington, U.S.
- Died: 1984 (aged 91–92); Bethesda, Maryland, US
- Other name: Isabel Mahaffee
- Education: Bryn Mawr College, 1909–1910; Barnard College and Columbia University, 1910–1912; Arts Student League, 1912–1915
- Occupations: Painter; illustrator
- Employer: New York Zoological Society
- Known for: Art depicting animals
- Spouse: Charles Delahunt Mahaffie

Isabel Cooper Mahaffie (August 22, 1892 – 1984) was an American artist known for her work depicting animals. She was a staff artist for the New York Zoological Association (currently the Wildlife Conservation Society) who participated in multiple research expeditions, such as the Arcturus expedition.

== Biography ==
Cooper was born on August 22, 1892, in Tacoma, Washington. She went to Bryn Mawr College from 1909 until 1910 and there she played multiple sports, including hockey, basketball, and water polo. Cooper then studied art at Barnard College and Columbia University from 1910 to 1912. From 1912 until 1915 she studied at the Arts Student League, an art school in New York City that was founded in 1875, and then had private classes with Alon Bement from 1913 until 1917. After graduating from Columbia she worked in multiple jobs including teaching art and science in New York City schools, interior decorating, theater set designing, and rug making. She met William Beebe, the head of the Department of Tropical Research at the New York Zoological Society, and he hired her to work as a staff artist recording the animals found on scientific expeditions, a job she held from 1917 until 1925.

Cooper was married to lawyer Charles Delahunt Mahaffie on August 25, 1928, and they had a son, Charles D. Mahaffie Jr.

She died in Bethesda, Maryland in 1984.

== Work as an artist ==
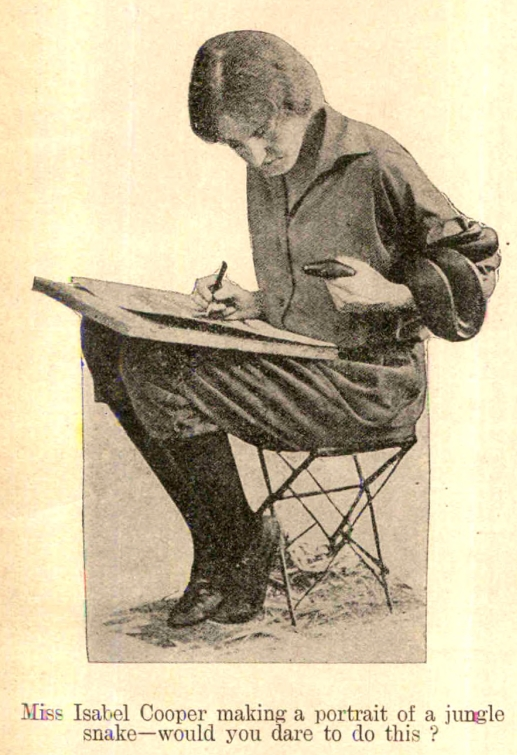
Cooper held live animals, including snakes, so that she could paint them with their living colors and character.

Cooper was known for her paintings of animals collected during research expeditions. She painted animals that were still alive in order to best capture their colors and character. Some of the animals were anesthetized first with ether so that they remained still while she painted them. Her first pieces were done with watercolors, and then she changed to using Japanese paper colors and India inks.

She made multiple trips while working for the New York Zoological Society including five trips to British Guiana, two trips to the Galapagos, and one trip to Asphalt Lake in Venezuela. The trips to British Guiana were to the research station at Kartabo Point on the Mazaruni River. Her return to the research station was documented in 1920, 1922, and 1924. While at the research station Cooper focused on amphibians and reptiles, especially those that had only previously been preserved as specimens in alcohol. In 1924, Helen Damrosch Tee-Van, Ruth Rose, and Cooper captured a large boa constrictor which caught the attention of the press describing the research expeditions. Her work was shown at a 1921 exhibit at the New York Zoological Society in Bronx Park. Cooper illustrated Beebe's 1924 book Galapagos: World's End which was reviewed favorably by the media.

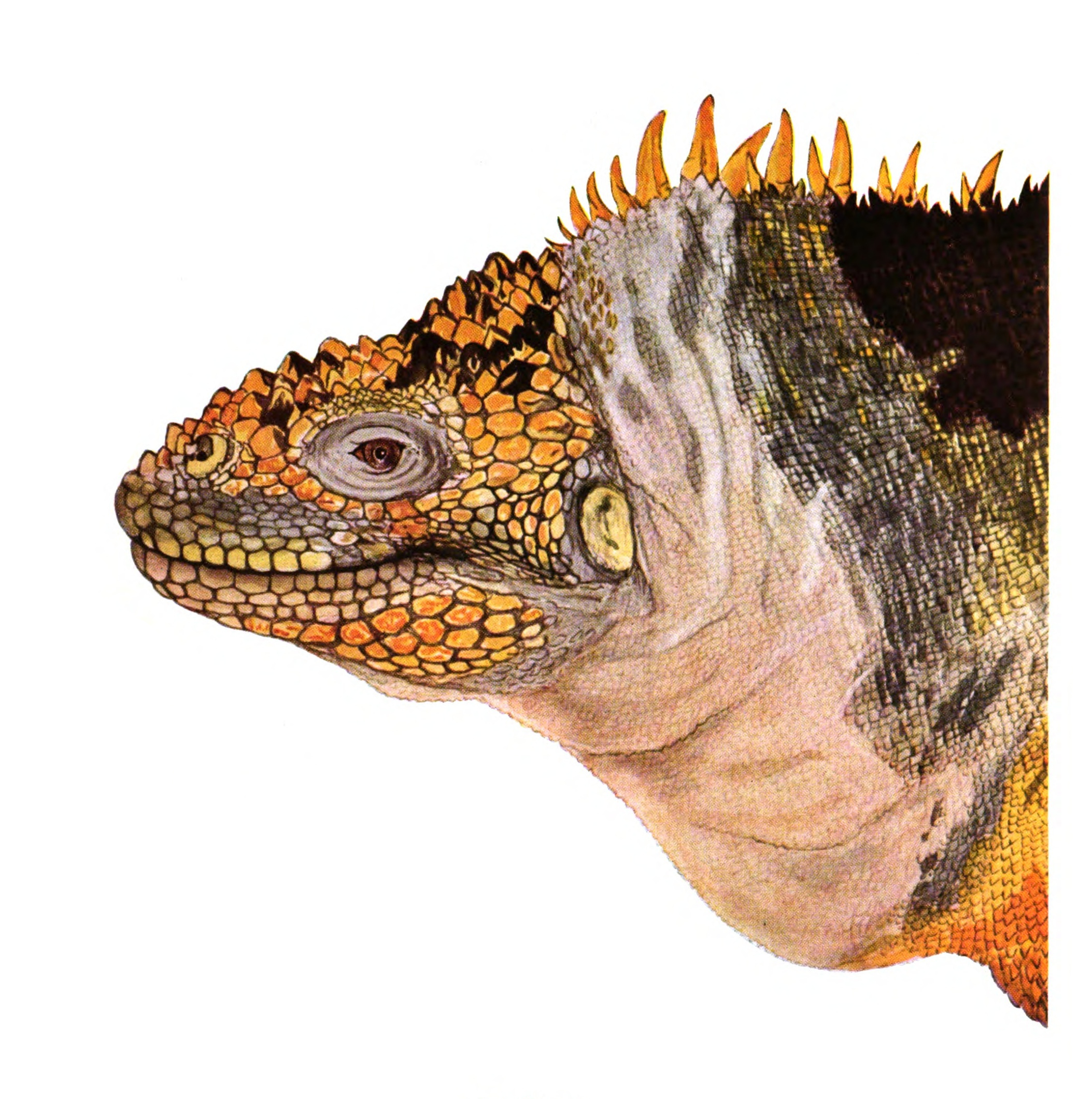
Cooper's illustration of a Galapagos land iguana from Galapagos: World's End

Following the 1924 expedition to British Guiana, Cooper wrote an article for The Atlantic Monthly about the challenges she faced in painting animals while in the jungle, and the delight she had in her unconventional job. In the article she described the challenges of painting live animals, some of which managed to escape from their cages while she was working. She later described her job as "the most peculiar job in the world".

Cooper participated in Beebe's 1925 Arcturus expedition that sailed from New York City on February 11, 1925. The expedition went from New York to the Sargasso Sea to the Galápagos Islands, and then returned to New York on July 30, 1925. Even though Cooper got seasick on boats, she generated illustrations during the cruise and used a diving bell to go under the seawater. The Arcturus expedition was widely shared in the press, and even when they were out of contact news stories about the expedition were published. The news coverage included multiple pictures of Cooper and the other people on board.

Multiple women were part of the research crew including Marie Poland Fish, Ruth Rose, Helen Damrosch Tee-Van, and Lillian Segal. This was unusual for the time and William Beebe's involvement of the women in research expeditions was highlighted in the news. Before sailing on the Arcturus expedition, Beebe noted that he preferred working with women and that "If it were feasible I would have my entire scientific party made up of them... Fine minds are as necessary in modern research exploration as fine courage. It is easier to find fine women than fine men."

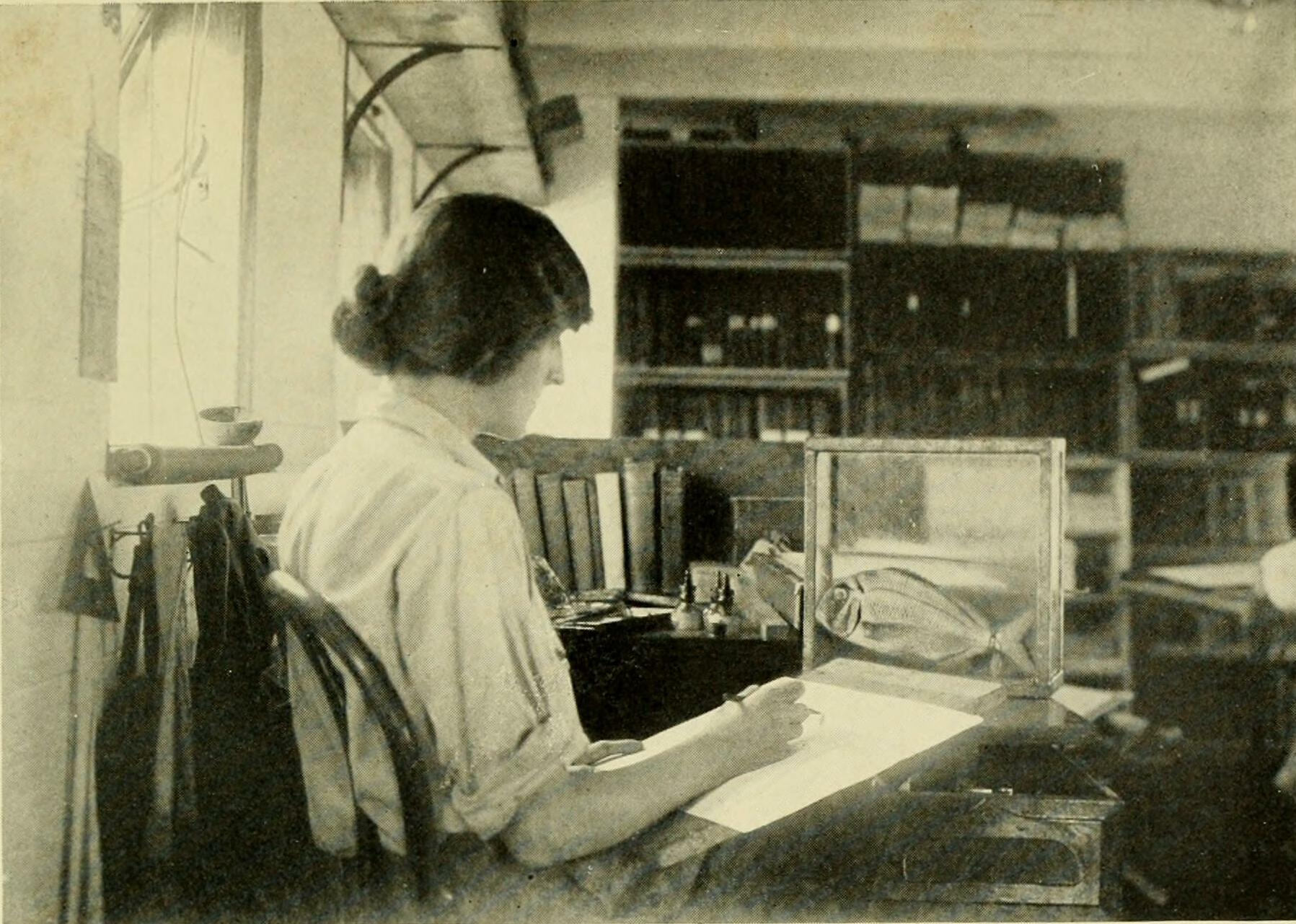
Cooper painting during the 1925 Arcturus expedition.

Cooper ultimately provided the illustrations for Beebe's book The Arcturus Adventure, and The New York Times reported "Isabel Cooper's colored plates are gorgeous." She also provided illustration for scientific papers on crustaceans, and illustrated David goes voyaging, the children's book about the twelve-year old David Putnam's participation in the Arcturus expedition.

Cooper's later artistic works include painting a jungle-themed guest room in the Rye, New York home of George Putnam and Dorothy Binney Palmer. In 1926 there was an exhibit of Cooper's watercolors at the Corcoran Gallery of Art in Washington, D.C. From 1927 until 1931 she made art plates for Encyclopedia Britannica which included insectivorous plants.

== Awards and honors ==
In 1922 she was named an honorary life member of the New York Zoological Society. Two species of moths have been named after Cooper: Cirphis cooperi and Paectes isabel.
