= Cannibal Island =

Cannibal Island may refer to:

- Cannibal Island (Manitoba), a Canadian island northwest of the Sandy Islands in Lake Winnipeg
- Fiji, previously known as the Cannibal Isles
- Nazino Island, an island in Ob, Russia, where an infamous GULAG prison camp was situated
- Pelegosto or Cannibal Island, a fictional island in the movie Pirates of the Caribbean: Dead Man's Chest
- Cannibal Island, a 1931 documentary film about headhunting, originally titled Gow the Headhunter.
