= Ernest B. Schoedsack =

American film director (1893–1979)

- Schoedsack during the production of The Most Dangerous Game in 1932
- Born: Ernest Beaumont Schoedsack; June 8, 1893; Council Bluffs, Iowa, U.S.
- Died: December 23, 1979 (aged 86); Los Angeles County, California, U.S.
- Occupations: Film producer; cinematographer; film director
- Years active: 1914–1952
- Spouse: Ruth Rose (m. 1926; died 1978)

Ernest Beaumont Schoedsack (June 8, 1893 – December 23, 1979) was an American motion picture cinematographer, producer, and director. Schoedsack worked as a cameraman in World War I, where he served in the U.S. Army Signal Corps. At the conclusion of the war, he stayed in Europe to further his career. He worked on several films with Merian C. Cooper including King Kong, Chang: A Drama of the Wilderness, and The Most Dangerous Game. He also collaborated with screenwriter Ruth Rose, whom he later married.

== Early life ==
Ernest B. Schoedsack was born in Council Bluffs, Iowa, on June 8, 1893. He ran away from home at age fourteen and worked with road gangs. He went to San Francisco, where he worked as a surveyor. He grew to be 6 ft 5 in (1.96 m), and his friends called him "Shorty".

== Film career ==
Schoedsack began his career thanks to his brother Felix that helped him get a job as a cameraman in films in 1914 for Mack Sennett. He continued working as a cameraman in World War I. He served in the Signal Corps of the U.S. Army in France in 1918. He also flew in combat bombing missions. After the war, he stayed in Europe furthering his career as a cameraman. In 1920, Schoedsack helped refugees in Poland escape the Polish–Soviet War. He worked with the American Red Cross. During 1921 and 1922, he also helped refugees from the Greco-Turkish War. After training at the Columbia University School of Military Cinematography, he was hired by The New York Times as a cameraman on an expedition around the world.

=== Chang and early films ===
Schoedsack began as a co-director with Merian C. Cooper. He first met Cooper in 1918 in Vienna. They both later worked for The New York Times, but decided to make their own films. Their first collaboration was on Grass, which was produced in 1925. That same year, Schoedsack met screenwriter and former actress Ruth Rose, and would later marry her in 1926. They met on an expedition to the Galapagos Islands, where Schoedsack was the cameraman, and Rose was the official historian.

Some sources claim that Schoedsack was a cameraman on Erich von Stroheim's Greed (1924), notably Herman G. Weinberg's book The Complete Greed of Erich Von Stroheim (1972) and the AFI Catalog of Feature Films. But Schoedsack himself emphatically denied working on the film, later telling one interviewer who asked, “Hell, no! I was in Persia making Grass all that year.”

In 1927, Cooper and Schoedsack produced the film Chang: A Drama of the Wilderness together, which depicts a man's survival in the Northern Siamese jungle. Schoedsack and Cooper spent 18 months in the jungle in order to produce the film and photograph certain scenes. While producing the film, stampeding elephants that are featured in the movie almost ran over Schoedsack and his crew. The risk was worth it, however, and Chang was later nominated for Unique and Artistic Picture at the first Academy Awards. (1929 was the only year that category was used, and it was subsequently merged into Best Picture. The other nominees were F.W. Murnau's Sunrise and King Vidor's The Crowd.) Schoedsack kept a print of a Bengal tiger pouncing with its jaws open in his office. When asked by a reporter about the photo, Schoedsack said that the tiger had sprung and he shot it.

In 1929, the duo worked to create The Four Feathers film. It was the first fiction film that Schoedsack and Cooper collaborated on. It was also one of the last silent films of Hollywood.

=== King Kong and early 1930s films ===
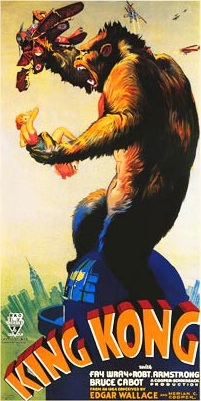

While Schoedsack and Cooper made several other films together, they are most known for directing the 1933 film King Kong. After finishing production on The Most Dangerous Game, Schoedsack joined Cooper in the production of King Kong. Schoedsack focused on scenes with human actors, while Cooper headed the special effects. Schoedsack, Cooper, and Rose inspired the characters of John Driscoll, Carl Denham, and Ann Darrow, respectively. The script was co-written by Schoedsack's wife, Ruth Rose. This film marked a transition in the working relationship of Schoedsack and Cooper. After the film, Schoedsack only directed films, while Cooper produced them. Their partnership ended, however, in the late 1930s.

In 1933, after filming King Kong, Schoedsack worked on shooting for a film that was never completed called Arabia. For this project, Schoedsack went to shoot on location in Syria. Another film was made in the King Kong franchise. Rose wrote the screenplay for the next film, Son of Kong, which was released in 1933 by RKO. Schoedsack was the sole director of the film. Also in 1933, Rose and Schoedsack collaborated on the film Blind Adventure.

=== Later work ===
Schoedsack directed several other films in the 1930s including The Last Days of Pompeii, Trouble in Morocco, and Outlaws of the Orient. In 1940, Schoedsack directed Dr. Cyclops, which was Hollywood's first science fiction film in technicolor. In 1949, the film Mighty Joe Young was released by RKO and directed by Schoedsack. It was a reunion film of the main King Kong creative team of Cooper, Schoedsack, and Ruth Rose. This would be the last film that Schoedsack would direct due to eye injuries received in World War II from testing photography equipment.

== Later life ==
Ruth Rose died on Schoedsack's birthday on June 8, 1978. Schoedsack died on December 23, 1979, in Los Angeles.

== Filmography ==
Film	Year released	Contribution
The Lost Empire	1924	Director of photography
Eagle Squadron	1924	Background photographer
Grass	1925	Producer, Director
Chang: A Drama of the Wilderness	1927	Producer, director
Gow, The Head Hunter	1928	Director of photography
The Four Feathers	1929	Film editor, director, director of photography
Rango	1931	Writer, director, producer in Sumatra, editor, photographer
The Most Dangerous Game	1932	Director
King Kong	1933	Director
Son of Kong	1933	Director
Blind Adventure	1933	Director
The Monkey's Paw	1933	Director of prologue
Long Lost Father	1934	Director
The Last Days of Pompeii	1935	Director
The Lives of a Bengal Lancer	1935	Photographer and director of shooting of background location shooting in India
Outlaws of the Orient	1937	Director
Trouble in Morocco	1937	Director
Dr. Cyclops	1940	Director
Mighty Joe Young	1949	Director
This Is Cinerama	1952	Director (prologue - uncredited)

== Works cited ==
- Richards, Jeffrey (January 1, 1973). Visions of Yesterday. Routledge & K. Paul. ISBN 9780710075765.
- Mario Gerosa, Il cinema di Ernest B. Schoedsack, Il Foglio letterario, Piombino, 2015 ISBN 8876065342.
