= Blind Adventure =

1933 film

- Theatrical release poster
- Directed by: Ernest B. Schoedsack
- Written by: Ruth Rose; Robert Benchley
- Produced by: Merian C. Cooper; David Lewis
- Starring: Robert Armstrong; Helen Mack; Ralph Bellamy
- Cinematography: Henry W. Gerrard
- Edited by: Ted Cheesman
- Music by: Roy Webb
- Distributed by: RKO Radio Pictures
- Release date: August 18, 1933
- Running time: 65 minutes
- Country: United States
- Language: English

Blind Adventure is a 1933 American Pre-Code mystery film directed by Ernest B. Schoedsack and starring Robert Armstrong, Helen Mack, Ralph Bellamy, and Roland Young. It was released by RKO Radio Pictures.

== Plot summary ==
Richard Bruce, a mid-life American businessman, arrives at a London hotel for a vacation. He finds a hotel maid, Elsie, in his room unpacking for him. She offers him some advice about what to wear for dinner at the hotel dining room, where his nervous and clumsy behavior annoys the other guests. After eating in his room, he tries to chat with Elsie, who resists such informality but tells him that he will experience a London foggy night, "a real pea-souper."

Going for a walk, he becomes disoriented and asks for directions to the hotel. Coming to a door that resembles the hotel's, he rings and knocks with no answer, but finds the door unlatched and enters what appears to be an upper-class house with a large tapestry by the stairs. No one is immediately present, but he spies someone in an armchair through an open door, who turns out be a man with a bloody head, apparently dead. When Bruce sees a man fleeing outside, he chases after him but loses him. A well-dressed man, who identifies himself as Gerald Fairfax suggests that they go back to the house to call the police.

At the house, Bruce and Fairfax find the front door locked, and their knock is answered by a butler. Going in, Bruce confirms that it is the same house when he saw the tapestry, but there is no body in the armchair and the room is occupied by the owners, Major Archer Thorne and his wife Grace. The Thornes are at first annoyed and then amused by the brash American's claims to have seen a body, and they are soon joined by their niece Rose, who was at the theater after having just arrived from Canada. When the Thornes and Fairfax excuse themselves to call the police, Bruce and Rose chat, revealing that she has never met her uncle and aunt before.

Going to the room where Bruce and Rose expect to find the Thornes calling the police, they instead overhear them complaining to Fairfax that he had not given them enough time to "fix things up." Shaken, Bruce and Rose return to the other room to decide what to do when a man with a bandaged head enters. Bruce immediately recognizes him as the "body" he had seen in the armchair. The man identifies himself as Jim Steele, a British "secret agent," who had been injured confronting the Thornes, whom he claims to be imposters and part of an international gang. Steele asks the couple to go to his superior, a man named Regan, and let him know that Steele is pretending to be dead. For identification, he gives Bruce a large cigarette case and suggests that the two exit the house through the attic and go across the rooftops to another house where they can safely exit to the street.

On the roof, Bruce and Rose encounter Holmes, a friendly burglar, who agrees to help them escape. Together, they crash an upper-class party in another house and eventually get to the street and to the address Steele gave them. These scenes involve a number of humorous situations involving mistaken identity and British class distinctions and diction while demonstrating Rose's intelligence, humor, and nerve. Scenes back at the house, meanwhile, reveal that Steele has been blackmailing the Thornes with letters concealed in the cigarette case. When Bruce and Rose meet Regan, they quickly realize that something is wrong, but Regan and his accomplices take them hostage, tying up Bruce and planning to take Rose to another hideout. Holmes, who had stayed nearby outside, comes into the room where Bruce is tied up and releases him. The two are able to release Rose, who had been hidden in a large sack, and Holmes takes her place.

Steele arrives at the scene, but Holmes (who has been discovered), Bruce, and Rose are able to make Steele and Regan suspect each other of double-play. In a struggle, a gun is fired and two policemen arrive to arrest the gang while Bruce, Rose, and Holmes escape out the back way with the incriminating cigarette case. Outside, Holmes looks on wistfully as Bruce suggests marriage to Rose and the two embrace.

== Production ==
Blind Adventure was made and released in 1933, shortly after the huge success of King Kong and during the simultaneous filming of Son of Kong. Director Ernest B. Schoedsack, Robert Armstrong, and Helen Mack were all involved in all three productions.

== Cast ==
- Robert Armstrong as Richard Bruce
- Helen Mack as Rose Thorne
- Roland Young as Holmes the Burglar
- Ralph Bellamy as Jim Steele
- John Miljan as Regan, Gang Leader
- Beryl Mercer as Elsie, the Maid
- Tyrell Davis as Gerald Fairfax
- Henry Stephenson as Major Archer Thorne
- Laura Hope Crews as Lady Rockingham
- Forrester Harvey as Coffee Wagon Proprietor
- Marjorie Gateson as Mrs. Grace Thorne
- John Warburton as Reggie
- Phyllis Barry as Gwen

== Production ==
According to David Lewis the film was meant to be produced by Jerry Sackheim but RKO's head of production Miriam Cooper disliked Sackheim and assigned it to Lewis. Lewis said Cooper told him "You know how close Schoedsack, Ruth Rose, and I are to each other. I don’t know how good Blind Adventure is, but I don’t want to hurt Ruth’s feelings and if it isn’t great, well, for the money it doesn’t matter that much.”

Lewis said Robert Benchley "added a certain lightness and flair to the script, which it desperately needed; Ruth Rose's stuff was routine and rather drab."

== Notes ==
- Lewis, David (1993). Curtis, James (ed.). The Creative Producer. Metuchen: Scarecrow Press. ISBN 0-8108-2720-4.
