= Lillian Segal =

American chemist and microbiologist

- Born: Lillian Segal
- Other names: Lillian Segal Kopeloff; Lillian Segal Root

Lillian Segal Root (formerly Kopeloff), best known as Lillian Segal, was an explorer known for her participation in William Beebe's 1925 Arcturus expedition where she examined how light was produced by deep sea fish.

== Biography ==
Segal was from Boston, and married Nicholas Kopeloff in Boston on July 31, 1917. She worked with him at the Louisiana Sugar Experiment Station in New Orleans where their research centered on sugars. This research determined the factors causing sugar to breakdown and provided methods to prevent the undesired breakdown of sugars.

She graduated from Barnard College in 1922, with a B.A and an MA. and was appointed director of the department of biological chemistry at the Psychiatric Institute of the New York State Hospital the same year. Her writings from this era include publications in The New Republic where she wrote on cancer and drug addiction.

=== Arcturus expedition ===
In 1925 Segal became a member of the Arcturus expedition that was led by William Beebe where her official title was "Associate in charge of special problems". She joined the ship in Norfolk, Virginia. Segal's role was to determine how the light is produced by the fish, and her plan was to use a spectroscope but the light produced by the fish was too dim to make this work, though they tried on dead fish that were collected during the expedition. To conduct her work on the ship, Segal had to devise her own chemical apparatus to collect fluids from the fish Photos from during the expedition present Segal working on deck and in the lab. The ship returned to land in August 1925.

In interviews given at the end of the expedition, Beebe credited the four women on the ship, Segal along with Ruth Rose, Marie Poland Fish, Helen Tee-Van, for his success. In 1928, William K. Gregory published the results of their work on the Arcturus expedition, with an acknowledgement to Segal's contribution on the project.

== Later life ==
Segal died on September 8, 1991.

== Selected publications ==
- Kopeloff, Nicholas; Kopeloff, Lillian (1919). "The Deterioration of Manufactured Cane Sugar by Molds". Journal of Industrial & Engineering Chemistry. 11 (9): 845–850. doi:10.1021/ie50117a007. ISSN 0095-9014.
- Kopeloff, Nicholas; Byall, S.; Kopeloff, Lillian (1920). "The Effect of Concentration on the Deteriorative Activity of Mold Spores in Sugar". Journal of Industrial & Engineering Chemistry. 12 (3): 256–257. doi:10.1021/ie50123a018. ISSN 0095-9014.
- Kopeloff, Lillian Segal; Kopeloff, Nicholas (1923). "Indican as influenced by bacillus acidophilus therapy". Proceedings of the Society for Experimental Biology and Medicine. 20 (7): 380. doi:10.3181/00379727-20-183. S2CID 87782543.
- Kopeloff, L. S. (1924-04-01). "Further studies on the effect of bacillus acidophilus therapy on indican excretion". Experimental Biology and Medicine. 21 (7): 382–383. doi:10.3181/00379727-21-193. ISSN 1535-3702. S2CID 87989549.
- SEGAL, LILIAN; HINSIE, LELAND E. (1926). "The Cyanosis of Dementia Praecox a Study of the Gas Relationships of the Blood". The American Journal of the Medical Sciences. 171 (5): 727–739. doi:10.1097/00000441-192605000-00013. ISSN 0002-9629. S2CID 72179324.
