= Son of Kong =

1933 American adventure monster film

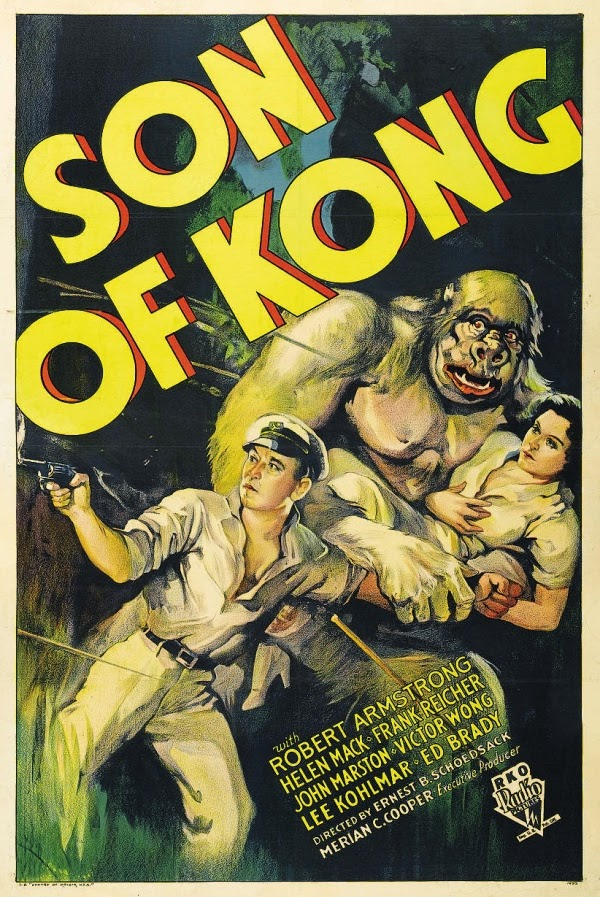
- Theatrical release poster
- Directed by: Ernest B. Schoedsack
- Screenplay by: Ruth Rose
- Produced by: Ernest B. Schoedsack
- Starring: Robert Armstrong; Helen Mack; Frank Reicher; John Marston; Victor Wong; Edward Brady
- Cinematography: Edward Linden; J.O. Taylor; Vernon L. Walker
- Edited by: Ted Cheesman
- Music by: Max Steiner
- Production company: RKO Radio Pictures
- Distributed by: RKO Radio Pictures
- Release date: December 22, 1933 (US)
- Running time: 69 minutes
- Country: United States
- Language: English
- Budget: $269,000
- Box office: $616,000

The Son of Kong (also known and publicized simply as Son of Kong) is a 1933 American Pre-Code adventure monster film produced by RKO Pictures. Directed by Ernest Schoedsack and featuring special effects by Willis O'Brien and Buzz Gibson, the film stars Robert Armstrong, Helen Mack and Frank Reicher. The film is the sequel to King Kong, being released just nine months after and is the second entry of the King Kong franchise.

== Plot ==
A month after the destruction in New York City by Kong, filmmaker Carl Denham has been implicated in so many lawsuits that he is almost bankrupt. Denham leaves the city aboard the Venture with Captain Englehorn, who knows he too will be similarly prosecuted if he stays, but their efforts to make money shipping cargo around Asia are not successful. After arriving in the Dutch East Indies port of Dakang, Denham and Englehorn attend a show of performing monkeys, which ends with a song ("Runaway Blues"), sung by a young woman, Hilda Petersen, to whom Denham is immediately attracted.

That night, Mr Petersen, Hilda's father who runs the monkey show, stays up drinking with a Norwegian skipper, Nils Helstrom, who had lost his ship under questionable circumstances. The two men argue and fight, during which Petersen is killed and his tent burns down. Distraught, Hilda releases all the monkeys from their cages. Soon after, Denham and Englehorn meet Helstrom, who was the man who had sold to Denham the map to Kong's island. Helstrom convinces them that there is a treasure on the island and they agree to sail to find it. Later, Denham meets Hilda while she is trying to recapture her monkeys and tries to cheer her up. Despite pleas for her safety, Denham refuses to take her with him when he sets sail from Dakang. However, shortly after the ship leaves, Hilda is found having stowed away on board.

Helstrom talks Hilda into silence, then incites a mutiny on board the Venture, but the sailors want no more captains and force him along with Denham, Englehorn, Hilda, and Charlie the cook away in a lifeboat. The group land on Skull Island and discover that the natives now blame Denham for Kong's destruction in their village, forcing them to retreat into the interior of the island, where they split up into two groups. Denham and Hilda encounter a giant albino gorilla, less than half the height of Kong, but still over twice the height of a man. The giant ape is stuck in quicksand, so Denham helps him out and bandages the ape's injured finger, establishing trust with the ape. Denham tells Hilda that he believes the ape is Kong's son and names him Little Kong.

Later, Englehorn, Charlie and Helstrom are attacked by a Styracosaurus which chases them into a cave. Denham and Hilda are attacked by a giant cave bear, but Little Kong fights it and forces it away. Helstrom had actually made up his treasure-story to get a free ride away from Dakang, but with the ape's help, Denham and Hilda find a real treasure - a huge jewel on the head of a seemingly abandoned giant stone idol, which he takes. Little Kong, Denham, and Hilda are attacked by a Nothosaurus, but Little Kong fights and kills it. A storm ensues and Helstrom tries to escape in the lifeboat but is killed by a Elasmosaurus. Englehorn, Hilda and Charlie quickly retrieve and board the lifeboat, but a violent earthquake and hurricane strikes the island, and it begins to sink into the ocean. The water soon surrounds Denham and Little Kong atop a tall mound and as the ape's foot gets stuck in the cracking mound, he sacrifices himself to save Denham by holding him above the water. The group in the boat reach Denham just in time, as the ape's hand, with Denham's bandage still on his finger, sinks below.

On the deck of a rescue ship, Denham and Hilda contemplate the tragic fate of Kong's son and of their future together, but Denham shows Hilda the jewel he salvaged, assuring her that it will provide financial security for all of them. It was Denham's intention to split the fortune four ways (Denham, Hilda, Englehorn and Charlie), but Hilda says that three ways is just fine, indicating that she is throwing her fortunes in with Denham for the long haul.

== Cast ==
- Robert Armstrong as Carl Denham
- Helen Mack as Hilda Petersen
- Frank Reicher as Captain Englehorn
- John Marston as Nils Helstrom
- Victor Wong as Charlie
- Ed Brady as Red
- Noble Johnson as Native Chief (uncredited)
- Steve Clemente as Witch Doctor (uncredited)
- Harry Tenbrook as Tommy (uncredited)
- Clarence Wilson as Hilda Petersen's Father (uncredited)
- Lee Kohlmar as Mickey

== Production ==
=== Script ===
The movie was proposed in March 1933 by Merian C. Cooper, who was recently promoted to RKO's Vice-President in Charge of Production after David O. Selznick left the studio to work for MGM. The studio quickly approved the idea, with the condition it ought to be released in December of the same year. The date was chosen for three reasons: To make a quick profit while the movie was still fresh in the audience's mind, to make the debut on a holiday season, and to avoid possible rip-offs from competitors.

The original script was written based on the actors available. Robert Armstrong agreed to come back to his prior role as Carl Denham, but not Fay Wray and Bruce Cabot. Ruth Rose finalized the script in just a matter of weeks.

Over the years, critics have pointed out similarities of the movie's plot with the 1927 movie The Enchanted Island, with suggestions The Son of Kong might be a direct copy of William G. Crosby's movie. According to film historian Ray Morton, it is much more probable the script was written in a hurry due to the short schedule and reused old ideas from Rango together with an aborted project from Willis O'Brien called Creation. Morton also brings that some scenes were based on Cooper's life. For example, the scene which Denham and Englehorn visit a tawdry tent show was based on Cooper's experiences in a travel he made with Edward Salisbury to Abyssinia.

There were some changes throughout the production. Little Kong was originally called "Kiko", and he was to be met by Denham after he had passed through the native village, revealed to be overrun by dinosaurs after the gate that separated it from the jungle was destroyed by Kong in the previous movie.

The original script also featured scenes of tribal warfare and a climactic dinosaur stampede during the massive earthquake that sinks Skull Island at the film's end. The stampede was going to utilize the models that had been built for Creation (1931) (most being used in the earlier King Kong). However, these sequences were never filmed due to the film's tight budget and shooting schedule.

Ruth Rose intentionally made no attempt to make a serious film on the logic that it could not surpass the first. She stated, "If you can't make it bigger, make it funnier."

=== Special effects ===
Some of the stop-motion models used for King Kong were also used for The Son of Kong. The non animated "long face" Kong armature, from the log bridge and Tyrannosaurus fight sequences, was also used for "Little Kong". Of the two known existing model-armatures of Kong, one is currently owned by film historian and collector Bob Burns, and the other is owned by director Peter Jackson, who remade King Kong in 2005. Also, the same Brontosaurus model used for the raft scene in King Kong can be glimpsed in the sea as the island is sinking. The stop motion animation in the film (done by Willis O'Brien who also did the effects in King Kong) is not as extensive as in the original, but included is a sequence where a Styracosaurus chases the explorers through the jungle. Today, the original Styracosaurus model, along with other original 1933 "Kong" dinosaurs, is also now owned by director Peter Jackson. An interesting giant bear is added to the creatures "Little Kong" challenges.

== Creatures ==
- Little Kong: Kong’s son, who’s much smaller, has all white fur, and a much happier face and personality. At the end of the film, in order to save the life of Carl Denham, the shady movie producer from the first film, "Little Kong" sacrifices himself in flooding water when the island sinks to the ocean during an earthquake.
- Archaeopteryx: A prehistoric bird seen flying around the island.
- Rhamphorhynchus: A prehistoric flying pterosaur seen flying around the island.
- Styracosaurus: A gigantic ceratopsian that chases Charlie, Englehorn, and Helstrom into a cave. The stop-motion model was originally used in test-filming for, but not included in, King Kong.
- Triceratops: A gigantic dinosaur in a deleted scene. This was another stop-motion model that was originally used in test-filming for, but not included in, the original King Kong.
- Cave bear: A gigantic prehistoric mammal that chases Denham and Hilda, which is fought and forced away by "Little Kong".
- Nothosaurus: A prehistoric reptile that attacks Denham, Hilda and "Little Kong" after they uncover the treasure, and which is killed by "Little Kong".
- Elasmosaurus: A gigantic prehistoric aquatic reptile that attacks and kills Helstrom when he attempts to escape in the lifeboat. The scene of the Elasmosaurus snapping its jaws is similar to the Brontosaurus snapping-jaws scene in the original King Kong.
- Brontosaurus: A gigantic dinosaur that appears roaring during the earthquake and storm. The stop-motion model was also originally used in the original King Kong.

== Release ==
=== Home media ===
The Son of Kong was released on VHS by Nostalgia Merchant in the 1980s and again in 1991 by Turner Home Entertainment.

In 2005 it received a DVD release and was available both by itself and as part of a collector's set alongside King Kong (1933) and Mighty Joe Young (1949), with commentary by Ray Harryhausen. In the UK and in Italy it was released on DVD in 2010.

In 2014 it was featured on Warner Archive Instant, a streaming service dedicated to the classic films and animation properties owned by Time Warner, Inc.

Warner Bros released a Blu-ray version on October 27, 2015.

== Reception ==
=== Critical response ===
The film received mixed reviews. In the New York Times review of the film, they described it as a "low melodrama with a number of laughs" that were deemed to be satisfying, though they added that the vision of comedy by the producers would be open to discussion. Variety described it as "fair entertainment". Among modern critics, review aggregation site Rotten Tomatoes reported that 42% have given the film a positive review based on 12 reviews, with an average rating of 4.90 out of 10. On Metacritic, the film has a weighted average score of 50 out of 100 based on 6 critic reviews, indicating "mixed or average reviews". It made a profit of only $133,000.

== See also ==
- List of stop motion films
