= Arcturus expedition =

Scientific expedition

The Arcturus expedition was a six-month-long research expedition from New York, to the Sargasso Sea, Cocos Island, and finally, the Galápagos Islands, led by naturalist William Beebe. The expedition occurred in 1925 on the Arcturus vessel. The expedition included six female explorers.

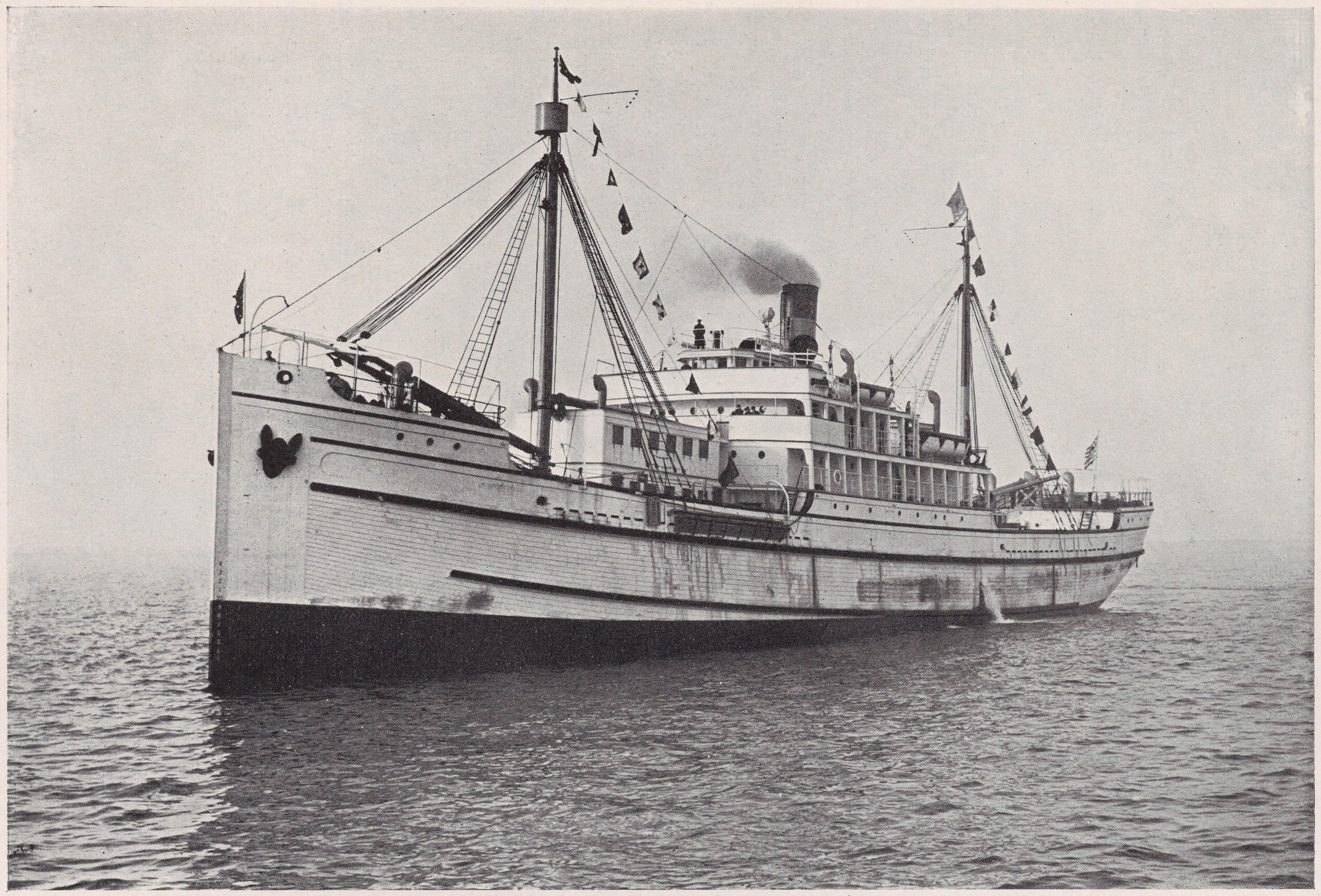
The vessel Arcturus during the expedition.

== Vessel ==
The Arcturus vessel was supported by the New York Zoological Society (currently the Wildlife Conservation Society), and the expedition was the first oceanographic mission backed by the organization. Harrison Williams provided three-fourths of the expedition cost, while Henry D. Whiton provided the vessel. Though Beebe and others called Arcturus a "steam yacht", it was actually a converted cargo ship. It had been built as a wooden-hulled Design 1065 ship for the United States Shipping Board's Emergency Fleet Corporation during World War One; originally named SS Clio, it had later been acquired by Union Sulphur Company, of which Whiton was the former president. Arcturus was coal-fueled, had an internal volume of 2,400 gross register tons (GRT), and was equipped with eight data collection lines hanging in the water. The data collection methods attached to these lines included surface nets, an otter trawl, vertical nets, plankton nets, a Petersen trawl, a dredge, tangles, sounding, a water bottle, and a thermometer. The vessel also included a platform for researchers to access the surface water more easily.

== Crew ==
Along with expedition leader Beebe, the Arcturus expedition drew attention due to the presence of women on board as crew members. Beebe said of the female crew members: "If it were feasible, I would have my entire scientific party made up of [women], just as readily as not. Fine minds are as necessary in modern research exploration as fine courage. It is easier to find fine women than fine men." The six female researchers, writers, and artists made essential contributions to the expedition two generations before it was commonplace for female scientists to be aboard research vessels.

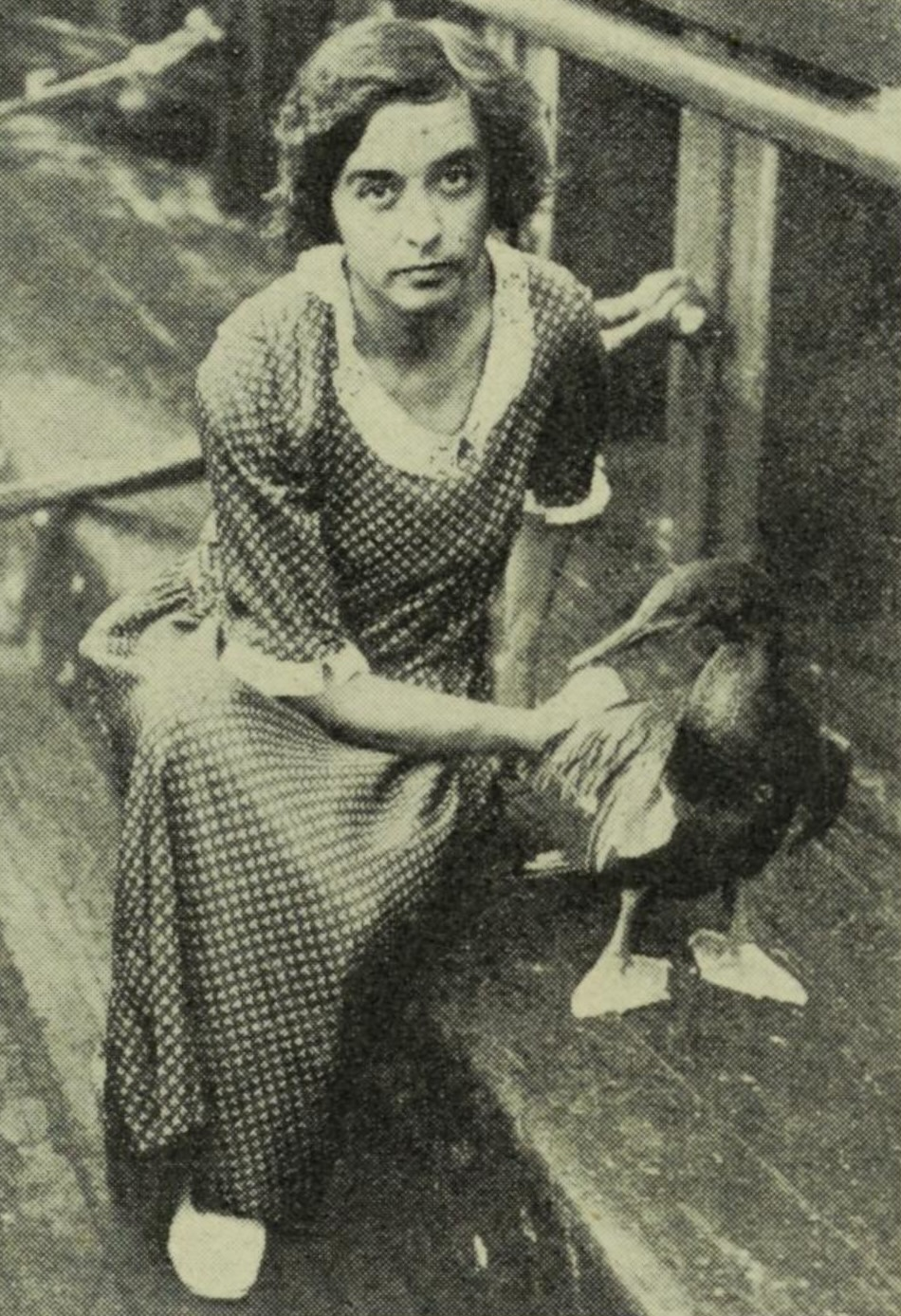
Ruth Rose, historian on the 1925 Arcturus expedition, with cormorant

The female crew members of the Arcturus expedition were Isabel Cooper, Marie Poland Fish, Ruth Rose, Lillian Segal, Helen Tee-Van, and Elizabeth S. Trotter. Cooper was a science artist and had previously worked with Beebe on a project for the New York Zoological Society. Poland Fish was an oceanographer and marine biologist who worked for the United States Bureau of Fisheries prior to the Arcturus expedition and eventually assisted with the founding of the Narragansett Marine Laboratory at the University of Rhode Island, along with being awarded the U.S. Navy Distinguished Service Medal. Rose was a writer and historian who documented the expedition in "The Arcturus Adventure" with Beebe. Segal was a biological chemist who investigated bioluminescence in deep-sea fish. Tee-Van was a science artist for the Zoological Society, and Trotter was a fisheries scientist who focused on vertebrate study during the expedition.

== The Arcturus Adventure ==
The Arcturus expedition was documented in "The Arcturus Adventure" by Rose and Beebe. The book was published in 1926 and contains information on the many species and habitats within the Sargasso Sea, Cocos Island, and the Galápagos Islands. The book's fourteen chapters consist of personal writings, documentation on the vessel and its workings, photographs, and illustrations. Some organisms studied during the expedition were bioluminescent microorganisms and the "giant devilfish" (Manta hamiltoni). According to Beebe, the expedition's most valuable scientific contribution was the crustaceans collection at a mid-ocean spot during a 10-day stay. During this 10-day stay, the number of fish, and crustaceans collected was equal to 80% of all the others that were collected during the rest of the voyage.
