= Harriet Bennett Strandberg =

American painter (1914–1991)

- Strandberg in the Cornell yearbook (1936)
- Born: Harriet Elizabeth Bennett; April 28, 1914; Glens Falls, New York
- Died: January 9, 1991 (aged 76); Cambridge, Massachusetts
- Education: Cornell University
- Known for: Zoological illustration

Harriet Bennett Strandberg (born Harriet Elizabeth Bennett; April 28, 1914 – January 9, 1991) was an American artist. She is known for scientific art such as appeared in the William Beebe monograph of deep-sea dragonfish for the New York Zoological Society Zoologica. She worked in a variety of media such as oil painting, ink and pencil drawing, etching, paper folding, Japanese ink brush, silk screen, photography, oil and soft pastels, and egg folk art (Ukrainian wax resist).

Born in Glens Falls, New York, Strandberg graduated from Cornell in 1936, continued to study art, and worked at New York Zoological Society. She was initiated into Alpha Alpha Gamma - National Fraternity of Women in Architecture and its Allied Arts.

In the 1939 Annual report of the New York Zoological society William Beebe, Director of Tropical Research, wrote:

Miss Bennett has given her entire time to the Department as artist, both in the Zoological Park laboratory and in Bermuda. She has completed upwards of 193 drawings, of which seventy-seven appeared in the monograph of deep-sea dragonfish.

The naturalist William Beebe was her cousin, and had influence on her appreciation of science and nature along with technical art; as did her father Harry Bennett who graduated from Princeton University and worked as civil engineer and as forester for paper industry. In 1947 she married the scientist Malcom W. P. Strandberg, who became a physics professor at MIT.

She was influenced by woodcut engraver and friend Elfriede Abbe, and also followed other artists such as Clare Leighton in the 1930s. Her mother Elizabeth Chandler Clark, and grandmother Abby Rogers Clark, both had an impact on Strandberg's appreciation of the arts.

== Art timeline ==
Strandberg with William Beebe

Strandberg by Alice Acker

- 1931: Glens Falls Academy graduated with First Honors, including Drawing and Art
- 1936: Cornell University, graduated with Bachelor of Arts, majored in sciences and art, member of Pi Beta Phi sorority
- 1937: Cornell postgraduate studies in art
- 1937: Alpha Alpha Gamma member: National Fraternity of Women in Architecture and its Allied Arts.
- 1932–1940: studied art at:
  - Brooklyn Museum Art School/Institute
  - New School For Social Research, (The New School)
  - Pratt Institute of Art
  - Art Students League of New York
- 1938–39: New York Zoological Society artist over 190 drawings for Zoological Park laboratory and in Bermuda
- 1961–62: Grenoble, France - art classes, still life, and plein air
- 1966: Vermont with Elfriede Abbe
- 1973: Boston Museum School of Fine Arts - student
- 1972–76: HBS private art studio, Howard Street, Cambridge MA
- 1974–82: Cambridge Center for Adult Education - including engraving studio
- 1977: Art Institute of Boston – student

== Exhibitions ==
- Woodstock, NY Art Association

== Publications of work ==
- 1939: Zoologica

== Referenced in Publications ==
- 1990: Pamphlet by Edward H. Bennett: A Letter to Harriet by Abby Rogers Clark 1925
- 1939: Annual report of the New York Zoological society
- 1973: Who's Who in American Art 1973
- 1999: Who Was Who in American Art 1564–1975
- 2017: Asa Wright Nature Centre newsletter
