= The Last Days of Pompeii (1935 film) =

1935 film by Merian C. Cooper, Ernest B. Schoedsack

- 1935 US Theatrical Poster
- Directed by: Merian C. Cooper; Ernest B. Schoedsack
- Written by: Ruth Rose
- Story by: James Ashmore Creelman
- Based on: The Last Days of Pompeii; 1834 novel by Edward Bulwer-Lytton
- Produced by: Merian C. Cooper
- Starring: Preston Foster; Alan Hale; Basil Rathbone; John Wood; David Holt; Dorothy Wilson
- Cinematography: J. Roy Hunt; Jack Cardiff (uncredited)
- Edited by: Archie Marshek
- Music by: Roy Webb
- Production company: RKO Radio Pictures
- Distributed by: RKO Radio Pictures
- Release date: October 18, 1935
- Running time: 96 minutes
- Country: United States
- Language: English
- Budget: $818,000
- Box office: $980,000

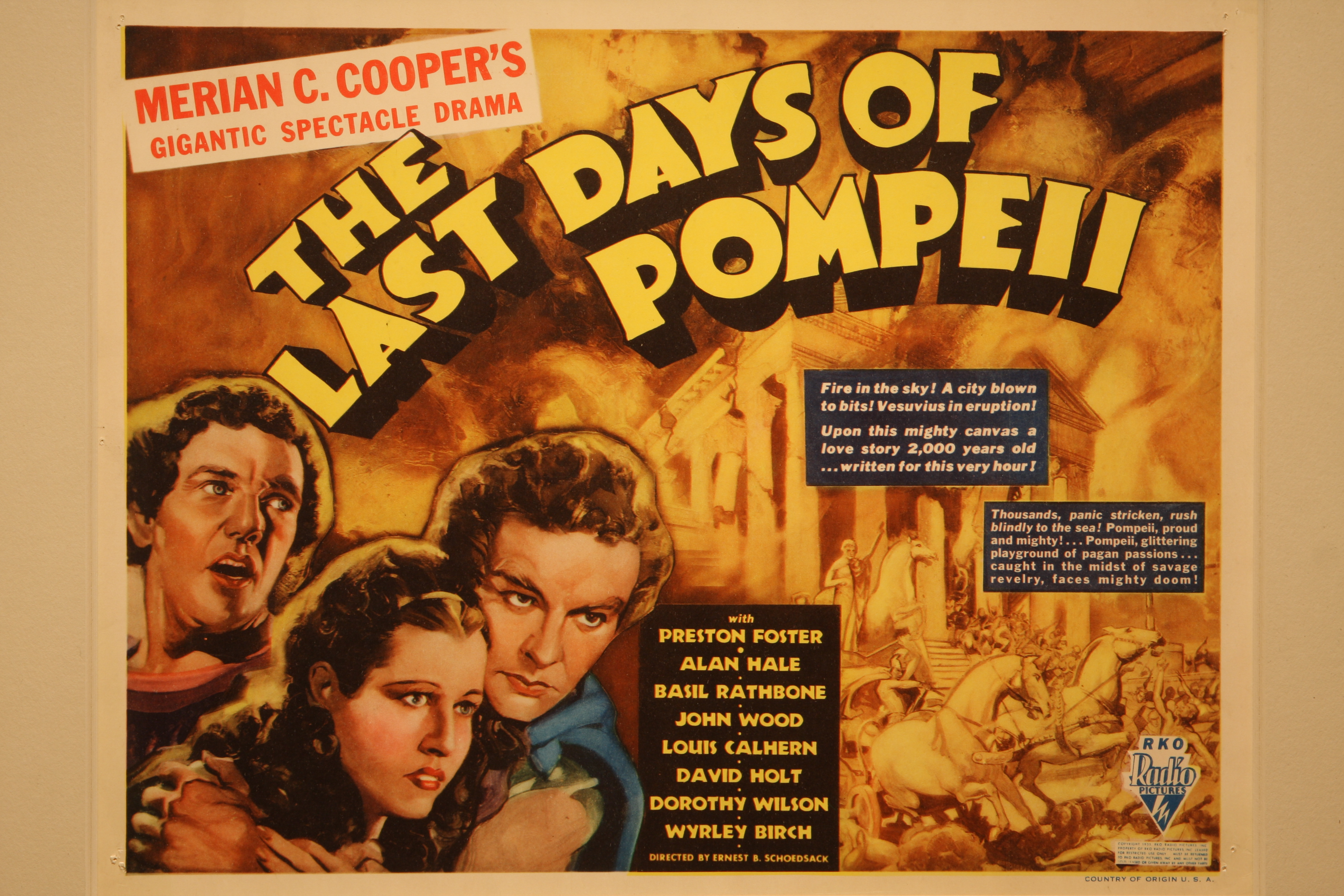
1935 half-sheet poster

The Last Days of Pompeii (1935) is an RKO Radio Pictures historical film starring Preston Foster and directed by Merian C. Cooper and Ernest B. Schoedsack, creators of the original King Kong.

== Plot ==
In the time of Jesus Christ, blacksmith Marcus is content with his life, beautiful wife Julia and six-month-old son Flavius. When Julia and their child are run down by a chariot in the streets of Pompeii, Marcus spends the little money he has to pay for a doctor and medicine. Needing more, in desperation, he becomes a gladiator. He wins his fight, but his wife and child still die. Blaming his poverty, he becomes an embittered professional gladiator and grows wealthier with each victory. Marcus adopts Flavius, a boy whose father Marcus killed in the arena. An injury ends Marcus' career as a gladiator and he takes a job working for Cleon, a slave trader.

Marcus raids an African village for slaves, where a father battles Marcus raiders until his young son's life is threatened and he is forced to surrender. Marcus identifies with the father's grief at being unable to protect his son. He stops slaving and turns to trading instead.

Marcus rescues a fortune teller, who foretells that Flavius will be saved by the greatest man in Judea. Marcus and Flavius travel to Jerusalem to see the man that Marcus thinks fits that description: Pontius Pilate, the Roman governor. At an inn along the way, a man tells him that the greatest man is staying in the stable, but Marcus does not believe him.

Pilate employs Marcus to lead a band of cutthroats to raid the chief of the Ammonites. Marcus comes away with many fine horses and much treasure, but finds that Flavius has been thrown from a horse and is near death. Marcus takes the boy to a noted healer and begs for his help. The healer is Jesus, who saves Flavius's life. When Marcus later reports back to Pilate with his share of the treasure, he finds Pilate has sentenced Christ to death.

As Marcus leaves the city, one of the apostles begs him to rescue Jesus, carrying his cross through the streets, but Marcus refuses. As Marcus and Flavius leave Jerusalem, they see three crosses on Calvary behind them.

Years pass. Marcus has grown wealthy as the head of the arena in Pompeii. One day, Marcus welcomes Pontius Pilate as a guest to his lavish home. When Flavius, now a young man, mentions his childhood memories of being healed by a man who preached love and compassion, Marcus assures him that there was no such person. The still-remorseful Pilate insists there was such a man, but he crucified him. The memory of the three crosses on the hill comes flooding back to Flavius.

Flavius is arrested and sentenced to die for secretly helping slaves escape from his father's arena. As he is herded into the arena to fight with the others, Mount Vesuvius erupts. As Marcus wanders stunned through the streets, he sees the jailer who refused to release Flavius trying to free his own son from the rubble. The dying man begs Marcus for mercy for his son. Marcus angrily refuses, but then remembers begging Jesus for mercy for Flavius and rescues the boy. Marcus sees his faithful servant Burbix leading a group of slaves carrying his treasure on litters. He orders them to use the litters to rescue the injured instead. As they get to a ship, Marcus sees that one of those saved is Flavius and offers a prayer of thanksgiving. The prefect and his men try to get through a gate to take the ship for themselves. Marcus holds the gate shut, giving the boat enough time to get away at the cost of his life. He has a vision of Christ reaching out to him just before he dies.

== Cast ==
- Preston Foster as Marcus
- Alan Hale as Burbix
- Basil Rathbone as Pontius Pilate
- John Wood as adult Flavius
- David Holt as young Flavius
- Louis Calhern as Prefect (Allus Martius)
- Dorothy Wilson as Clodia, a slave Flavius rescues and falls in love with
- Frank Conroy as Gaius Tanno
- William V. Mong as Cleon, The Slave Dealer
- Murray Kinnell as Simon, The Judean Peasant
- Henry Kolker as Warder
- Edward Van Sloan as Calvus
- Zeffie Tilbury as The Wise Woman
- Ward Bond as Murmex of Carthage, the gladiator who defeats Marcus
- Edwin Maxwell as The Augur
- Jason Robards Sr. as The Tax Gatherer
- Wyrley Birch as Leaster
- Gloria Shea as Julia

== Production ==
While honeymooning in Europe, Cooper visited Pompeii's ruins and felt inspired to produce a movie depicting the volcanic eruption that devastated the city. The Last Days of Pompeii, along with She, were part of a two-picture agreement with Cooper, with the initial agreement stating that each film would be made for $1 million each. However, in pre-production, RKO informed him of budget changes, stating that he would now have to shoot the two films for a combined $1 million rather than $1 million each. Cooper stated that he "cheated a lot" on She to direct more money into Pompeii. According to a blurb in the January 23, 1934, issue of The New York Times, the film was originally supposed to be filmed in color. It cost $818,000 to make.

Although inspired by the novel of the same name by Edward Bulwer-Lytton, the film has nothing to do with the book. The film's plot compresses the time between Christ's death and Vesuvius's eruption into 10–20 years. Ruth Rose wrote the screenplay, which drew elements from a story by James Creelman and Melville Baker. The story was meant to imitate DeMille's religious epics, like The Sign of the Cross in scope and grandiosity.

Willis O'Brien supervised the special effects for the climactic eruption scene. According to an article published in the Manila-based Tribune, large sets were constructed for the film, including a reproduction of the Temple of Jupiter with part of the Pompeiian forum, as well as the Pompeiian arena. The house of a wealthy Roman was reconstructed for the film. Many of these sets were destroyed on-camera as part of the final eruption scenes. For the destruction of the temple of Jupiter, four high speed cameras recorded twenty special effects technicians who destroyed the set using wires and rods.

Historical accuracy was not a priority for the production. The recently established film production code required that the inclusion of violence include moral messaging, which may explain the film's Christian message. Last Days includes a final repentance by Marcus that seems designed to align with a rule that wrongdoers in movies reform if they have a happy ending. One contemporary American review noticed a conspicuous lack of sexual material for a film set in a Roman vacation town. A direct mailing campaign promoting the film targeted clergymen and teachers.

== Reception ==
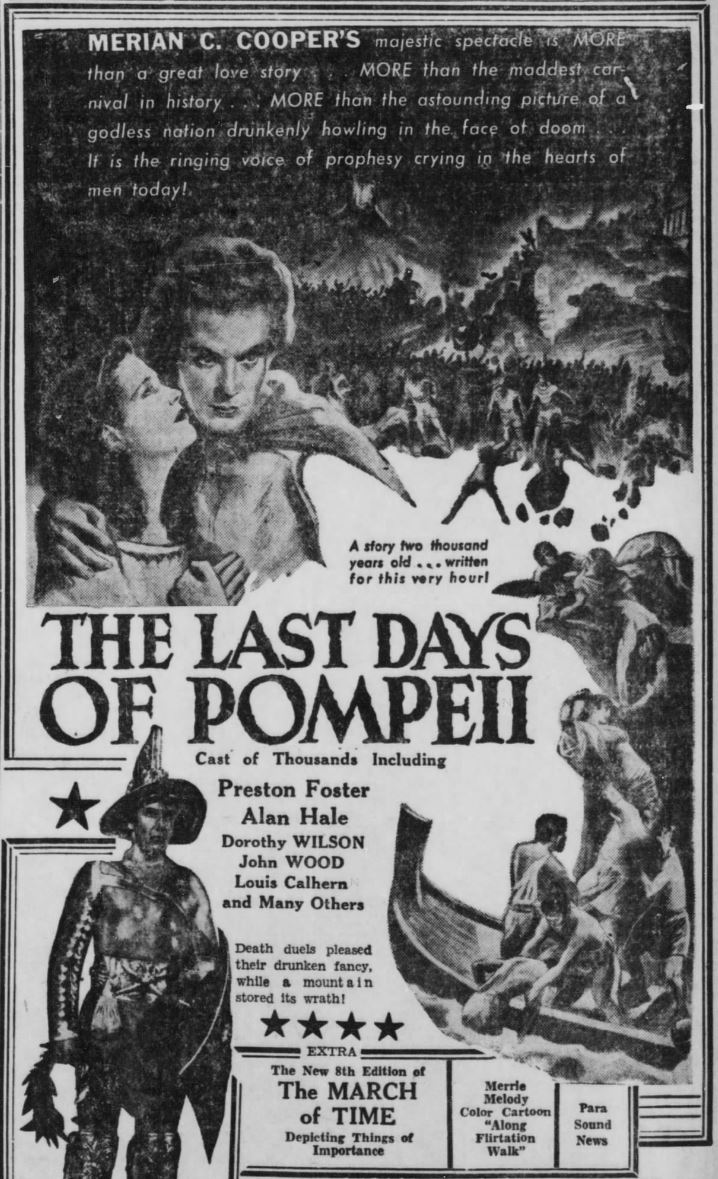
Newspaper advertisement for The Last Days of Pompeii

The Last Days of Pompeii appeared to be a moderate box-office success upon its release in 1935, but RKO ultimately lost $237,000 after the film's first theatrical run. However, the picture finally made a profit for the studio following its 1949 re-release, when it shared a double bill with the re-release of another 1935 production, Cooper and Schoedsack's adventure fantasy film She. A book on representations of Pompeii in media speculated that Last Days was unsuccessful because of "its exaggerated exhibition of Christian morality and the completely implausible span of time covered in Judea." Writing in 2012, Richard B. Jewell remarked that the film probably failed because of the "relatively meager level of its spectacle", stating that O'Brien's special effects were not as impressive as usual.

Andre Sennwald reviewed the picture for The New York Times in October 1936, praising it as "an ably managed historical work" until the last part of the film "begins to bludgeon the moral". Sennwald described Rathbone's performance of Pilate as "a fascinating aristocrat, scornful in his hauteur and sly in his reasoning." Foster's performance as done "with thoroughness and skill." Writing at the Brooklyn Eagle, John Reddington compared the film to Cecil B. DeMille's religious epics and called Preston Foster's performance "virile". However, he concluded that "the ideology [...] is much too confused to merit consideration as a spiritual experience or a historical drama." Both Sennwald and Reddington noted that the temporal closeness of the destruction of Pompeii to Christ's crucifixion, as depicted in the film, was not historical.

Variety wrote that film's strengths lay in its technical achievements, despite "once or twice does a phony note intrude", and not in its historical accuracy. They noted that the film "omits even a small allusion to Pompeii's sex angle. This film has no romance ... A Roman story without a single orgy, without even a glimpse of the public baths or a hint that the town was devoted to amorous dalliance is in, itself something", but the omission allowed the story to focus on "Roman politics and commerce ... miserable poverty ... and barbaric games and sports."

In its December, 1935 edition, Modern Screen offered a different opinion with a four-star review that focussed on the technical achievements, while praising the "excellent cast of Preston Foster, Basil Rathbone, David Holt, Louis Calhern, John Wood and Dorothy Wilson." It concluded that the film’s strengths lay in its production values. "As out and out dramatic fare, it is still above the average, although we believe the photographers and the technical department are the real stars of the picture. Sets are gorgeous, and the scenes of the destruction of Pompeii are actually breath-taking in their seeming reality. For those scenes alone, the picture can be highly recommended."

Two later critics noted the film's similarity to gangster films. Writing in a book on epic films in 1984, Derek Elley noticed that Last Days showed the suffering of the Depression at a time when most epic films engaged in escapism. The narrative arc, where a poor man resorts to crime to build his fortune, is based on classic gangster film narrative. Lines like "I've been a fool all my life. One has to kill to get money" recalled "American gangsterism". In a book on ancient Rome in cinema, Maria Wyke described Last Days as a "highly moralistic gangster film dressed in classical costume". For Wyke, the film failed because it lacked the "pagan violence and eroticism" that made previous historical movies exciting, while performing Christian moralizing that "lacked any historical credibility." Wyke also discussed the interaction of Last Days with American responses to fascism. The destruction of Pompeii, and specifically, the destruction of a large statue of a Roman athlete in the film, was a metaphor for modern Europe's "perceived decadence." Wyke found that while promotional material for the film praised its historical qualities as education, the content of the film was not focused on historical veracity. Elley conceded that some of the architectural material was historical, but that the newly risen Christ being present at the eruption of Pompeii was historically incorrect.

In a book covering hundreds of historical epics, Gary A. Smith described the film's middle as "long and tedious" but praised the special effects involved in the final eruption. In October 2003, writing for TCM Jay S. Steinberg observed. "There are plenty of flavorful supporting efforts in the film, including those of Louis Calhern as the treacherous prefect, but Rathbone essentially walks away with the picture in a role that took all of a week to shoot. In turns contemptuous and conflicted, Rathbone gave Pilate perhaps the richest shadings of anyone to ever assay the part onscreen."

== Bibliography ==
- Elley, Derek (1984). The Epic Film: Myth and History. Routledge & Kegan Paul. ISBN 0710096569.
- Jewell, Richard B. (2012). RKO Radio Pictures: A Titan Is Born. University of California Press. ISBN 9780520951952.
- Smith, Gary A. (2000). Epic Films: Casts, credits and commentary on over 350 historical spectacle movies. McFarland & Company, Inc. ISBN 0786415304.
- Vaz, Mark Cotta (August 2005). Living dangerously The adventures of Merian C. Cooper, creator of King Kong. Villard. ISBN 9781400062768.
- Wyke, Maria (1997). Projecting the Past: Ancient Rome, Cinema and History. Taylor & Francis. ISBN 9780415906142.
