= Design 1065 ship =

Standard ship types of the US

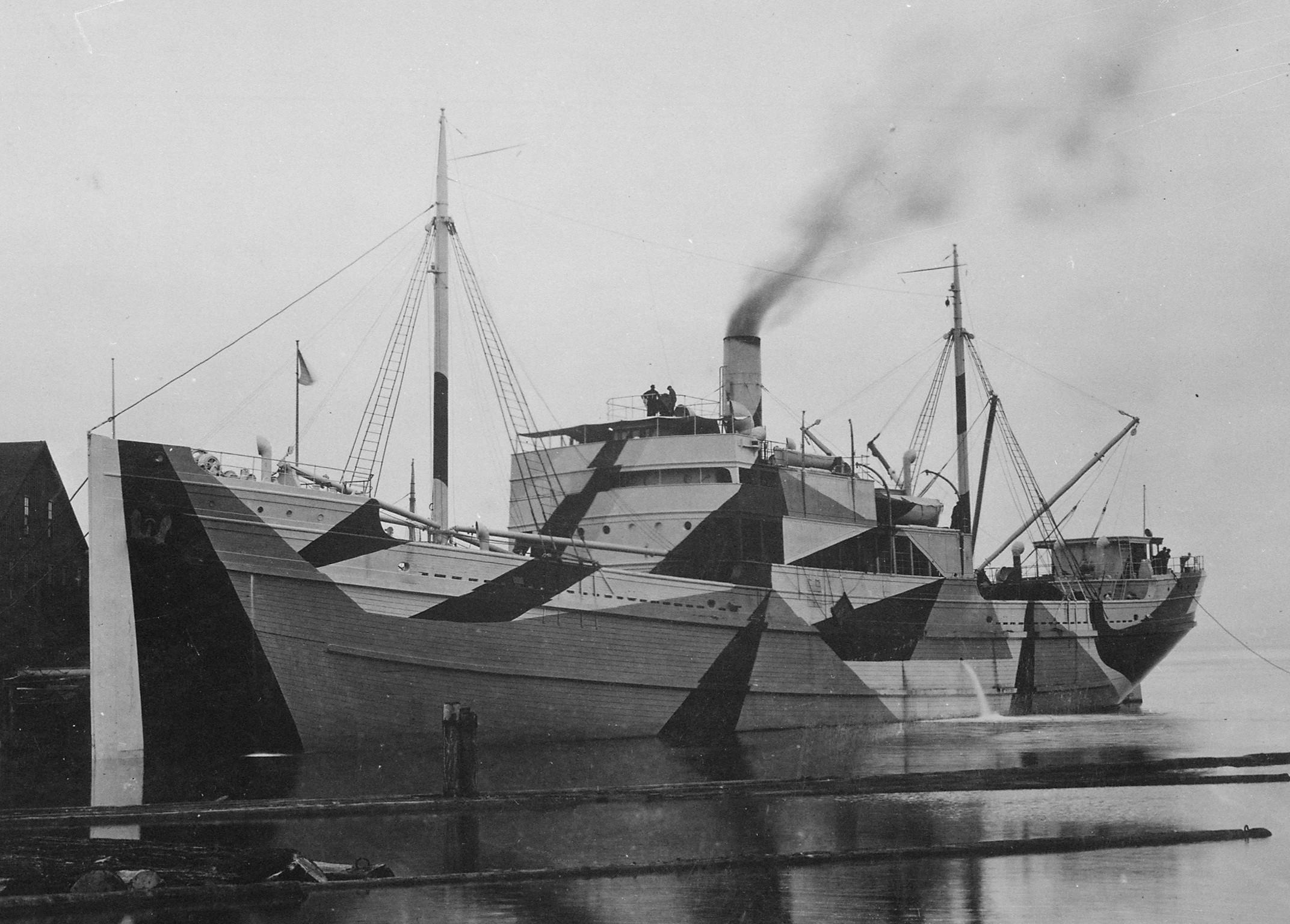
- Design 1065 ship SS Cruso in dazzle camouflage at the Pacific American Fisheries shipyard in 1918.

Class overview
- Name: EFC Design 1065
- Builders: Pacific American Fisheries, Bellingham, Washington
- Cost: $50,000
- Built: 1918–1919
- Planned: 7
- Completed: 7

General characteristics
- Tonnage: 2,445 gross tons 3,500 dwt
- Length: 268 ft 4 in (81.79 m)
- Beam: 46 ft 0 in (14.02 m)
- Draft: 26 ft 0 in (7.92 m)
- Propulsion: Twin triple-expansion engines

The Design 1065 ship (full name Emergency Fleet Corporation Design 1065) was a wooden-hulled cargo ship design approved for production by the United States Shipping Board's Emergency Fleet Corporation (EFC) in World War I. A total of 7 ships were ordered and completed for the USSB from 1918 to 1919. The ships were constructed at the Bellingham, Washington shipyard of Pacific American Fisheries. The USSB originally wanted Pacific American Fisheries to follow its standard "Ferris-type" design (Design 1001) used by other shipyards but PAF was successful in convincing them to use their own design which they felt was more seaworthy. The cost was $50,000 per ship.

One of these ships, originally named SS Clio, was later renamed Arcturus and served as the vessel for naturalist William Beebe's 1925 Arcturus scientific expedition.

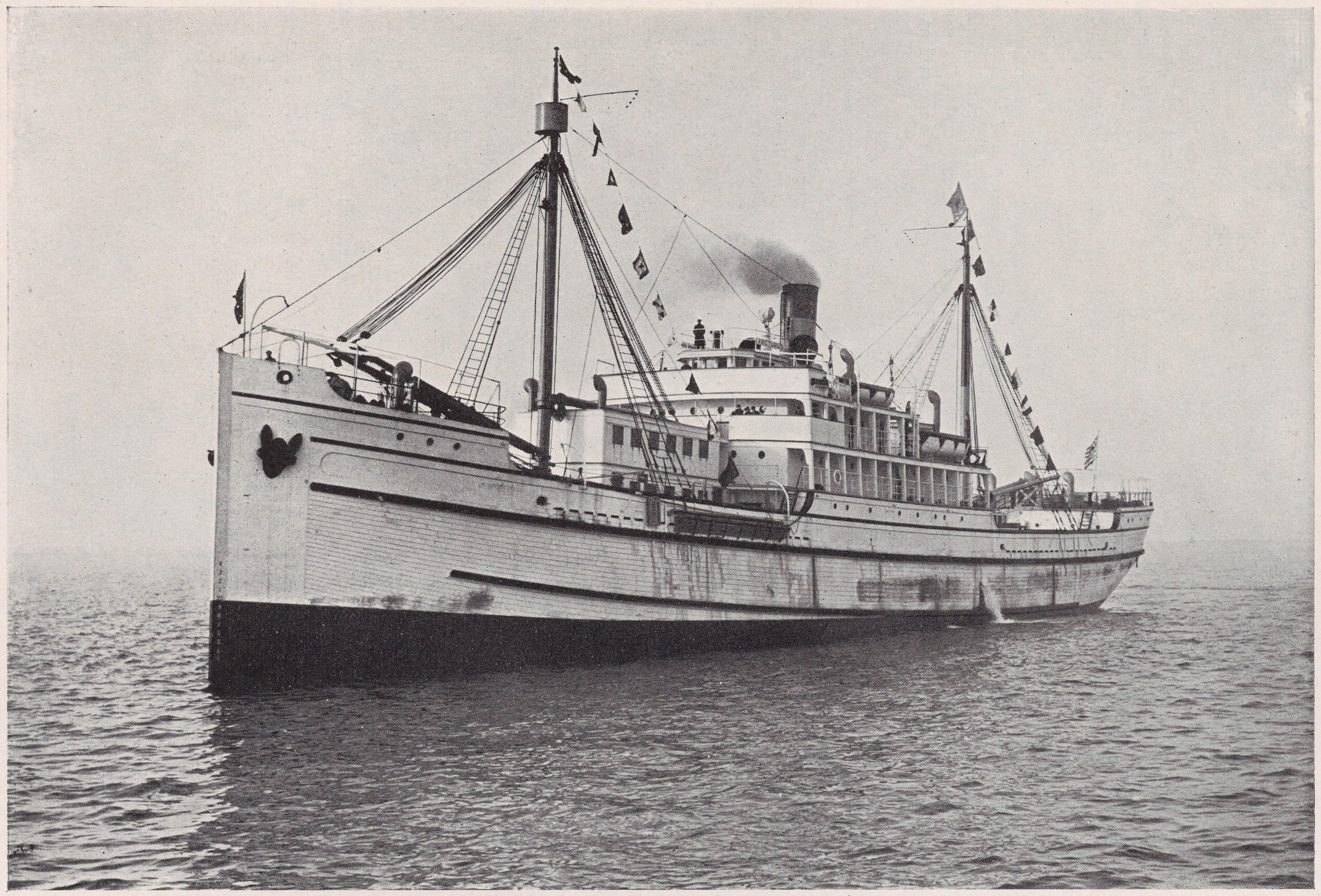
Design 1065 ship Arcturus (formerly SS Clio) as modified for William Beebe's 1925 scientific expedition.

== Gallery ==
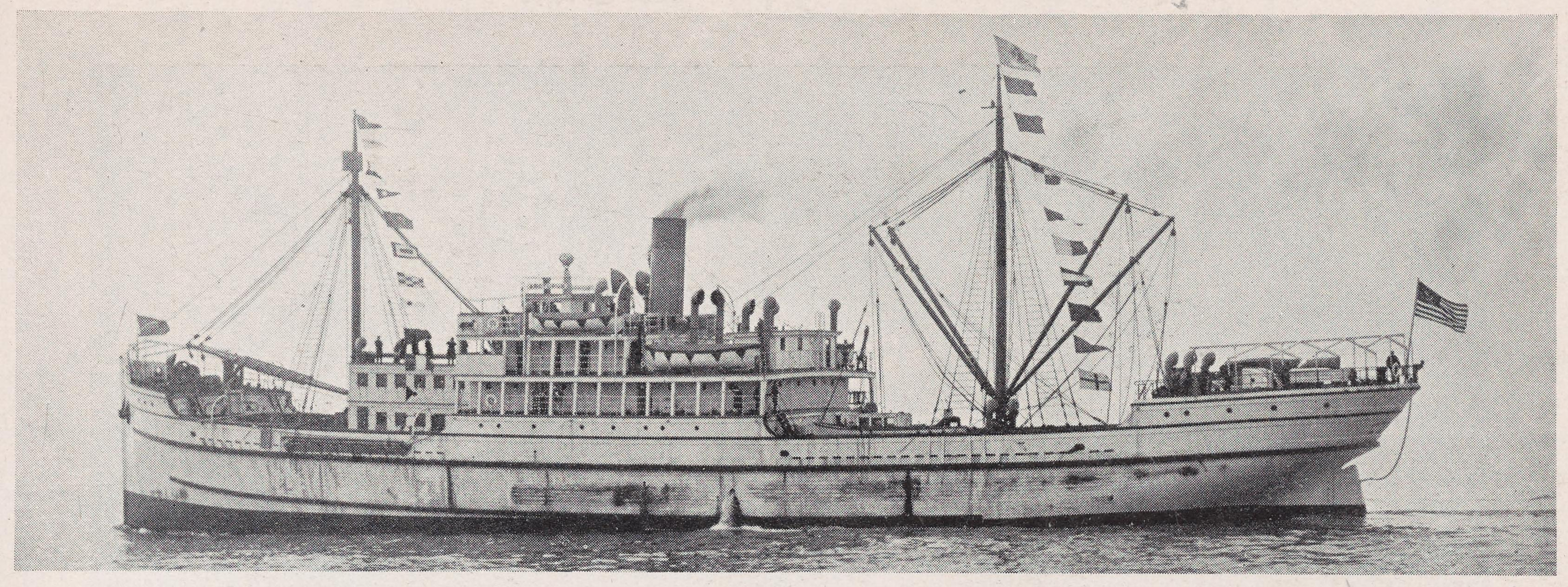
Another view of Arcturus on Beebe's 1925 expedition.

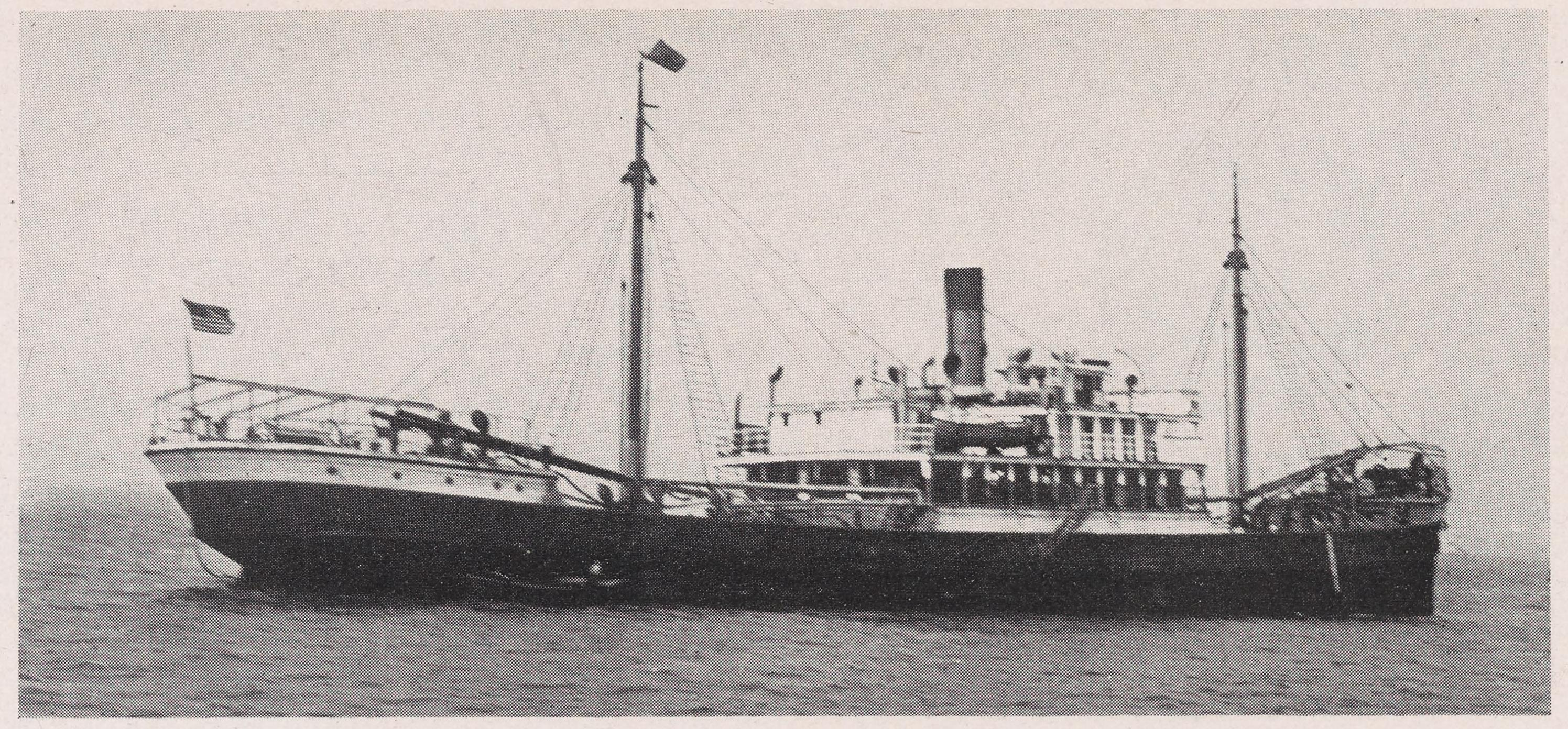
Arcturus in 1924, before Beebe's expedition.

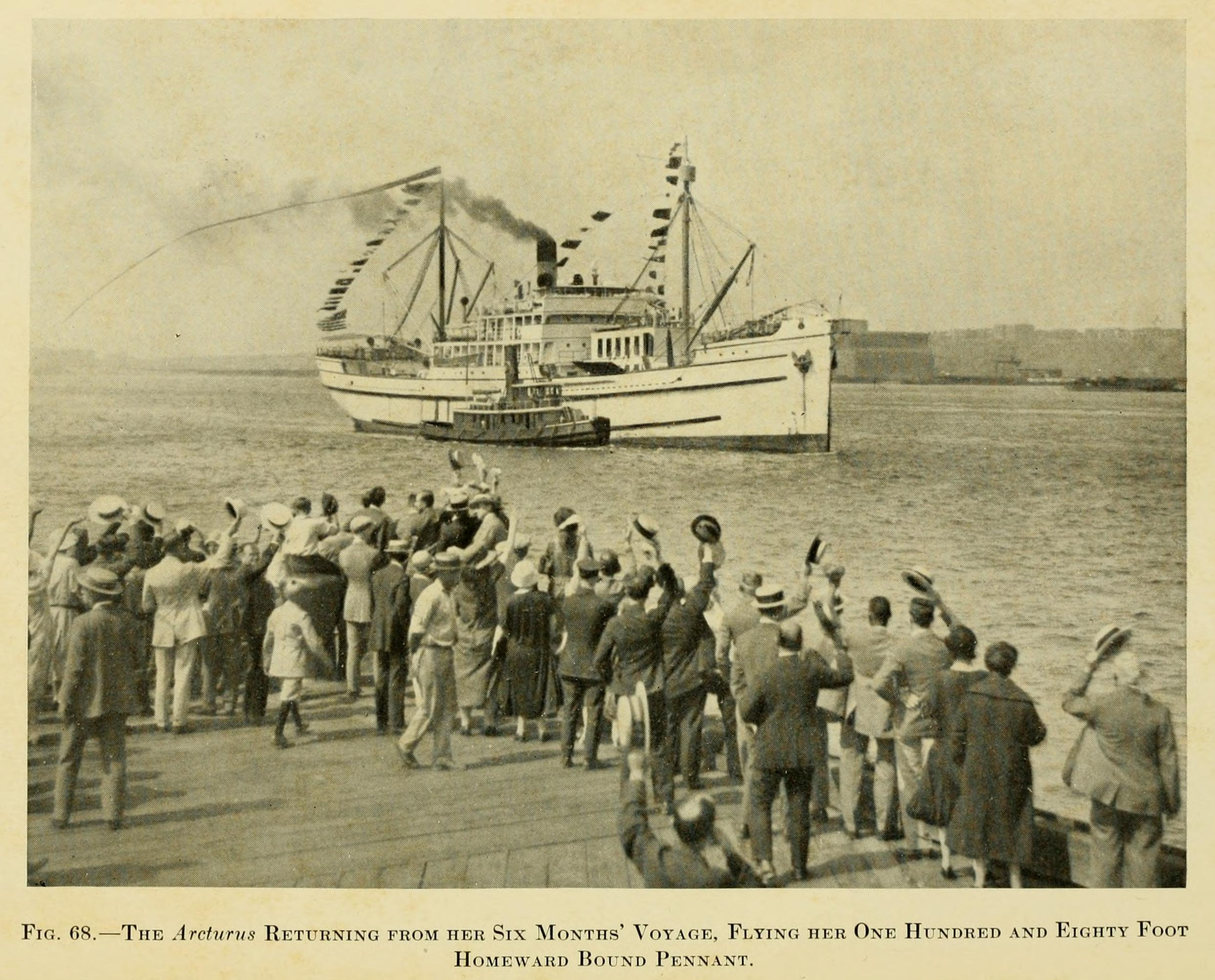
Arcturus on her return from the expedition.

== Bibliography ==
- McKellar, Norman L. "American Wooden Shipbuilding in World War One, Part II" (PDF). Steel Shipbuilding under the U. S. Shipping Board, 1917-1921. ShipScribe.
- Bennett, Edwin C. (July 1925). "Equipping the Arcturus". Zoological Society Bulletin. 28 (4). New York Zoological Society: 87–90. Detailed account of how Arcturus was converted into a research vessel.
