= Frank Damrosch Jr. =

Frank Damrosch Jr. (November 30, 1888 – April 15, 1966) was an American Episcopal priest, author, and writer. Damrosch, the son of noted composer Frank Damrosch, served as a leader of the Anglo-Catholicism movement in the U.S. He also authored three books and penned articles for church magazines. Taking after his father, Damrosch often lectured on music at community clubs.

== Early life, education, and career launch ==
Damrosch was born in New York City. He graduated from Morristown School (now Morristown-Beard School) in Morristown, New Jersey in 1906. Damrosch then studied at Yale University in New Haven, Connecticut (1906-1909) and the General Theological Seminary in Manhattan (1910-1911).

In 1913, Damrosch completed his Bachelor of Divinity degree at Berkeley Divinity School. After graduation and ordination to the priesthood, he moved to Peekskill, New York to study under the Rev. Charles Winfred Douglas. Damrosch also worked as Douglas' assistant and personal secretary.

== National church leadership roles ==
Damrosch held leadership roles within the Catholic Congress of the Episcopal Church. He served as secretary of the Executive Committee of the Congress for its first three national meetings held in 1925, 1926, and 1927. (The meetings took place in New Haven, Connecticut; Milwaukee, Wisconsin; and Albany, New York.) Damrosch chaired the Congress Committee for the 1938 meeting.

Damrosch also served on the Executive Committee for the 1933 meeting and on the 1913 Joint Committee on the Revision of the Hymnal. Established by the General Convention of the Episcopal Church, this committee made recommendations for a set of 561 hymnal texts. The General Convention voted to adopt these recommendations in 1916.

== Rectorships in northeastern churches ==
Damrosch served as the rector at St. Paul's Church in Doylestown, Pennsylvania for 23 years (1935-1958). He also served as a rector at other churches in the northeastern U.S., including:

- St. Luke's Church in Mechanicville, New York (1915-1917)
- Trinity Church in Bristol, Rhode Island
- St. James' Episcopal Church in New York City

== Family ==
Damrosch married Dorothy Sheffield (née Frisby) Damrosch in New York City on May 13, 1911. They had four children together. In 1943, the Japanese military captured Damrosch's son Leopold,, holding him prisoner of war in the Philippines until his release in 1945. Taking after his father, Leopold worked as an Episcopal priest at several churches in Maine and as Rector of the Church of the Resurrection in Manhattan. He died in Hulls Cove, Maine, in 1990.

== Works ==
- And Was Crucified: Addresses for Good Friday on the Seven Last Words (1945)
- The Faith of the Episcopal Church (1946)
- Confirmation Instructions for Children (1951)
