= Chang: A Drama of the Wilderness =

1927 film

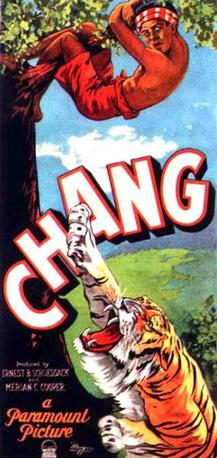
- Film poster
- Directed by: Merian C. Cooper; Ernest B. Schoedsack
- Written by: Achmed Abdullah
- Produced by: Merian C. Cooper; Ernest B. Schoedsack
- Starring: Kru; Chantui; Nah
- Cinematography: Ernest B. Schoedsack
- Edited by: Louis R. Loeffler
- Music by: Hugo Riesenfeld
- Production companies: Famous Players–Lasky Corporation; Paramount Famous Lasky Corporation
- Distributed by: Paramount Pictures
- Release date: April 29, 1927
- Running time: 64 minutes
- Country: United States
- Languages: Silent; English intertitles

Chang: A Drama of the Wilderness, also known simply as Chang (from Thai ช้าง, "elephant") is a 1927 American silent documentary film about a poor farmer in northern Nan Province (northern Thailand) and his daily struggle for survival in the jungle. The film was directed by Merian C. Cooper and Ernest B. Schoedsack. It was released by Famous Players–Lasky, a division of Paramount Pictures.

== Plot ==
Kru, the farmer depicted in the film, battles leopards, tigers, and even a herd of elephants, all of which pose a constant threat to his livelihood. As filmmakers, Cooper and Schoedsack attempted to capture real life with their cameras, though they often re-staged events that had not been captured adequately on film. The danger was real to all the people and animals involved. Tigers, leopards, and bears are slaughtered on camera, while the film's climax shows Kru's house being demolished by a stampeding elephant.

Chang: A Drama of the Wilderness (1927)

== Release ==
=== Home media ===
Chang was released for the first time on DVD by Image Entertainment on November 21, 2000. Milestone Video would release the film on VHS and on DVD on January 8, 2002 and October 29, 2013, respectively.

== Reception ==
Chang was one of the "biggest movies of 1928."

On the review aggregator website Rotten Tomatoes, 94% of 18 critics' reviews are positive, with an average rating of 7.5/10.

Author and film critic Leonard Maltin awarded the film three and a half of four stars, calling the film "[a] fascinating ethnographic documentary/narrative." Mordaunt Hall from The New York Times praised the film, calling it "vivid and thrilling."

=== Awards ===
Chang was nominated for the Academy Award for Unique and Artistic Production at the first Academy Awards in 1929, the only time that award was presented.

== See also ==
- List of films shot in Thailand
