= Satis N. Coleman =

American music educator (1878–1961)

Satis N. Coleman (1878–1961) was an influential progressive music educator. In her 2010 induction in the National Association for Music Education (NAfME) Hall of Fame, it was written, “She promoted music education for its ability to lead children to relate music to other subjects, such as history, geography, and the study of natural resources.” She taught in rural Texas, Washington, D.C., and in New York City at Teachers College, Columbia University (where she earned her Ph.D. in Educational Psychology) and the Lincoln Lab School; and she published 33 books with major publishers. Because of the environmental element of her music education philosophy, her work was a historical precedent for eco-literate music pedagogy, and may have been the first non-jazz improvisation approach. Her Creative Music for Children was very influential, incorporating anthropology, improvisation, instrument construction, and alternative notation. She may have been the main proponent of Recapitulation Theory in music education, and her philosophy had a distinctively spiritual aspect, which can be seen as connected to instrument making as a spiritual practice.
