= Elfriede Abbe =

American sculptor

- Born: Elfriede Martha Abbe; February 6, 1919; Washington, D.C., U.S.
- Died: December 31, 2012 (aged 93); Manchester, Vermont, U.S.
- Education: Cornell University
- Known for: Sculpture; Engraving; Illustrator

Elfriede Martha Abbe (February 6, 1919 – December 31, 2012) was an American sculptor, wood engraver, and botanical illustrator, often displaying nature and simple country living inspired by her Upstate New York home. A self-publisher, Abbe created numerous hand-printed books, which she printed on a printing press in her studio.

== Early life and education ==
Sixth Day by Abbe

Abbe was born in Washington, D.C., in 1919. She graduated from Cornell University in 1940, earning a degree in architecture, and attended Syracuse University.

== Career ==
Her statue The Hunter was featured at the 1939 New York World's Fair in New York City.

From 1942 until her retirement in 1974, she was an illustrator at Cornell University.

After retiring from Cornell, she lived and worked in Manchester, Vermont until her death in 2012. During her retirement, she published on art and natural history, continuing to produce artwork throughout her life.

== Notable awards ==
- Barrett-Colea Prize; National Sculpture Society
- Elliot Liskin Award; Salmagundi Club
- Gold; National Arts Club
- Gold; Pen & Brush
- Fellowship; The Louis Comfort Tiffany Foundation

== Notable collections ==
- Carnegie Mellon University, Pittsburgh, Pennsylvania
- Cornell University, Ithaca, New York
- Metropolitan Museum of Art, New York City
- National Gallery of Art, Washington, D.C.
- New York Botanical Garden, The Bronx, New York City
- Smith College, Northampton, Massachusetts
- Yale University, New Haven, Connecticut

== Published works ==
- Abbe, Elfriede. The Plants of Virgil's Georgics: Commentary and Woodcuts By Elfriede Abbe. Ithaca: Cornell University Press, 1965. ISBN 0-8014-0001-5
- Abbe, Elfriede. Seven Irish Tales. Ithaca, NY: Cornell University Press, 1957.
- Abbe, Elfriede. Mushrooms: Wood Engravings in Color. Elfriede Abbe, 1970.
- Abbe, Elfriede. How Prints Are Made. Manchester, Vt.: South Vermont Art Center Press, 1971.
- Abbe, Elfriede. An Introduction to Hand-made Paper. Manchester, Vt.: Southern Vermont Art Center Press, 1972.
- Abbe, Elfriede. The Fern Herbal: Including the Ferns, the Horsetails, and the Club Mosses. Ithaca: Comstock, 1981.
