= Ruth Rose =

American screenwriter (1896–1978)

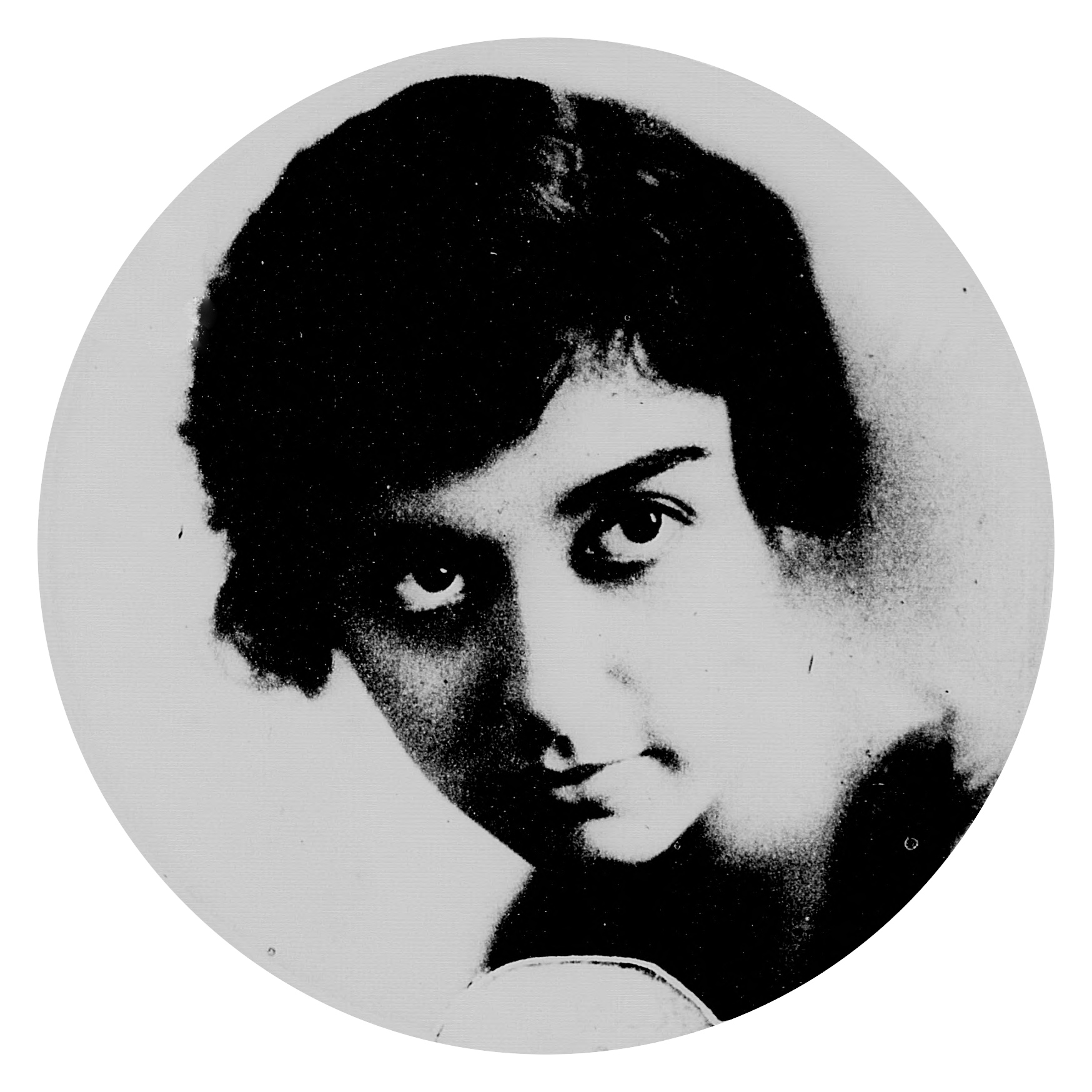
- Born: January 16, 1896; Somerville, Massachusetts, US
- Died: June 8, 1978 (aged 82); Santa Monica, California, US
- Occupation: Screenwriter
- Spouse: Ernest B. Schoedsack (m. 1926)
- Children: 1
- Writing career
- Notable work: King Kong (1933 film)

Ruth Rose (January 16, 1896 – June 8, 1978) was a writer who worked on several films in the 1930s and the 1940s, most famously the original 1933 classic King Kong.

== Early life ==
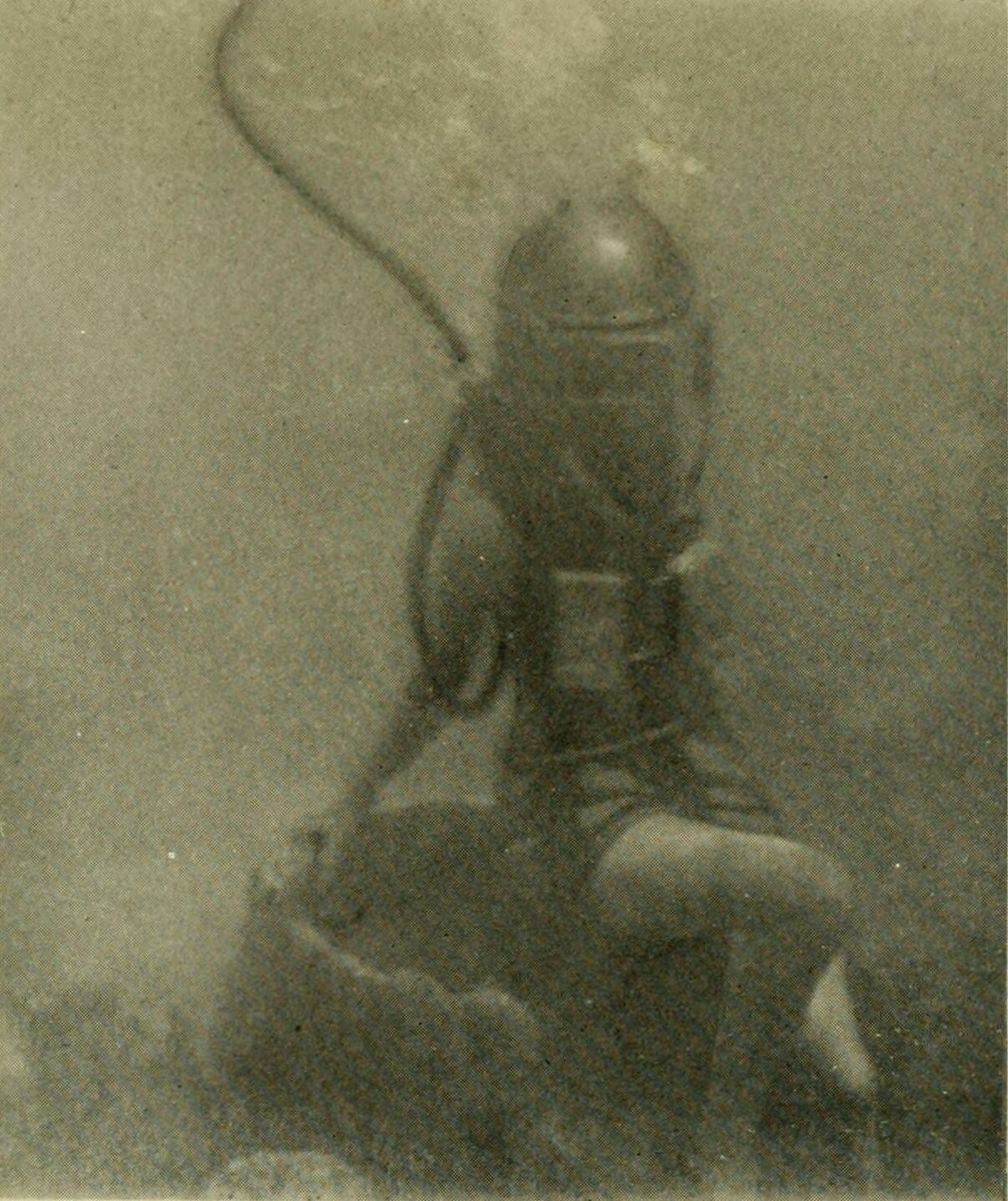
Ruth Rose diving at Cocos in fifteen feet of water

Rose was born on January 16, 1896, to a playwright, Edward E. Rose. At age 14, she first appeared on the Broadway stage doing various ingenue parts. In 1925, Rose was working as the official historian on a New York Zoological Society (currently the Wildlife Conservation Society) expedition called the Arcturus mission to the Galapagos Islands, led by William Beebe. Ernest Schoedsack was working as a cinematographer on that same expedition, just after he had made the film Grass: A Nation's Battle for Life (1925) with Merian C. Cooper. Rose and Schoedsack met there and fell in love. In 1926 they were married. She joined Schoedsack and Cooper on some of their other adventures and productions, including the film Chang (1927).

== King Kong ==
In the early 1930s, Cooper began development for his film King Kong. He had already gotten two other writers to work on Kong. The first one, Edgar Wallace, died before he could make any significant changes, and the second, James Ashmore Creelman, wrote a screenplay that was too slow-paced, descriptive, and had too much flowery dialogue according to Cooper. So he hired Rose to rework it. Rose cut out many of the long, unimportant scenes that Creelman had written, in order to make it more fast-paced. She is credited with writing such famous lines as "Oh, no. It wasn't the airplanes. It was Beauty killed the Beast." She also based the character of Carl Denham on Merian Cooper and Jack Driscoll she based on her husband, Ernest Schoedsack. It was now more like one of the earlier Cooper-Schoedsack adventures.

== Later life ==
After the success of King Kong, Rose wrote several other movies including Blind Adventure, Son of Kong, She, The Last Days of Pompeii, and Mighty Joe Young, another giant ape adventure. Her Kong screenplay was the basis for two remakes of King Kong, one in 1976 and one in 2005. Rose did not write any more films before her death on June 8, 1978, although she did many rewrites and dialogue changes through the years. She was survived by her husband and her only child, Peter, born in 1929 with cerebral palsy.

== Filmography ==
- King Kong (1933) (screenplay)
- Blind Adventure (1933) (writer)
- Son of Kong (1933) (story)
- She (1935) (adaptation and dialogue)
- The Last Days of Pompeii (1935) (screenplay)
- Mighty Joe Young (1949) (screenplay)
