= Gow the Headhunter =

- Poster
- Directed by: Edward A. Salisbury
- Release date: 1931
- Country: United States
- Language: English

Gow the Headhunter (or Gow, the Headhunter, with a comma) is a 1931 exploration film. The footage, from the 1920s, was originally released as 4 different films before being released as a 63-minute feature film in 1931. The film was released in the 1950s under the title Cannibal Island. The film is also known as Gow the Head Hunter, or simply Gow, and Gow the Terror and Gow the Killer.

== Premise ==
The film consists of genuine documentary footage but an attempt at creating a plot may be perceptible in the end.

== Production ==
Footage originates from a two-year expedition led by Edward A. Salisbury, a wealthy British adventurer, in the Western Pacific. The aim of the filming was to document the life of cannibals in the South Seas islands (Western Solomon Islands, the New Hebrides and the Eastern Solomons), including the practice of headhunting.

== Reception and legacy ==
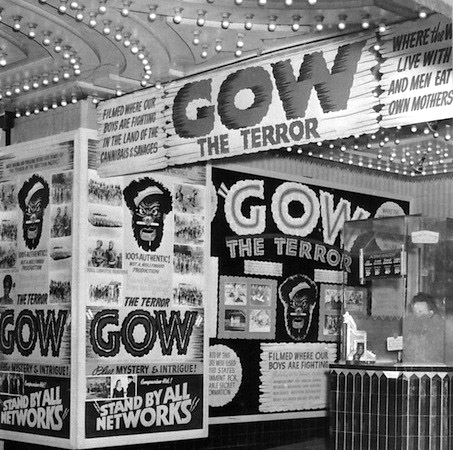
A theater showing of Gow the Terror

In 2012 Flicker Alley released a Blu-ray edition of The Most Dangerous Game including Gow, presenting the film as an Exploration classic

According to the company, the film "is not only a true curiosity but also in many ways a key influence of later Cooper and Schoedsack productions including King Kong."
