= Marie Poland Fish =

Marine biologist

- "Mrs Charles J. Fish" in the New York Times in 1989
- Born: 1900; Paterson, New Jersey, US
- Died: February 2, 1989 (aged 88); Westport, Connecticut, US
- Education: Smith College (undergraduate); University of Rhode Island (PhD)
- Spouse: Charles John Fish

Marie "Bobbie" Dennis Poland Fish (1900 – February 2, 1989) was an American oceanographer and marine biologist known for her bioacoustics research and the finding of eel eggs in the Sargasso Sea. Her research on underwater sound detection allowed the United States Navy to distinguish enemy submarines from wildlife. The United States Navy awarded her its highest civilian award, the Distinguished Service Medal, in 1966 to recognize her contributions during her twenty-two years (1948–1970) leading the "Underwater Sound of Biological Origin" project for the Office of Naval Research. She also founded the Narragansett Marine Laboratory with her husband Charles. It is now the University of Rhode Island's Graduate School of Oceanography.

== Early life and education ==
Marie Poland was born in 1900 in Paterson, New Jersey. Her nickname "Bobbie" derived from her bobbed flapper haircut. She graduated from Smith College before earning a PhD from the University of Rhode Island. She graduated in 1921, and married Charles Fish in 1923.

== Career ==
Before working for the Office of Naval Research, she worked for the United States Bureau of Fisheries, Buffalo Museum of Science, New York State Conservation Department, University of Rhode Island, United States National Museum (now the Smithsonian Institution), Pacific Oceanic Biology Project, and the State of Rhode Island in various roles as scientist, researcher, investigator, instructor, and curator.

In 1925, Marie Poland Fish and her husband Charles John Fish, participated in the first oceanographic expedition of the New York Zoological Society (now the Wildlife Conservation Society), the Arcturus expedition, which was led by William Beebe. The six-month long expedition left New York on February 11, 1925, and sailed through the Sargasso Sea to the Galápagos Islands, returning to New York on July 30, 1925. Marie Poland Fish worked on samples from the expedition at least up to 1932. During this expedition she became the first person to identify the eggs of the elusive American eel. which reached the newspapers given the mystery surrounding the origin of eels. In a 1926 article in Science she first describes the collection of the eggs and their development into what she was able to identify as an American eel. In 1927 she published the full taxonomic description. She concludes her initial description by noting that

...the sea has given up the last secret concerning the life history of the American eel which it has jealously guarded for so many centuries

— Marie Poland Fish, Science,

Fish's publications include work cataloging sounds from marine animals, including from fish and whales. She went on to determine the biological mechanisms that allow fish to make sounds. She was a prolific author, writing over 200 articles in academic journals and popular magazines, including a newspaper column on popular science that she wrote with her husband from 1936 to 1939, the only time they collaborated professionally.

== Commemoration ==
The Fish family endowed the Charles and Marie Fish Lecture in Oceanography, an annual public lecture on oceanography hosted by the University of Rhode Island's Graduate School of Oceanography that began in 1990.

== Selected publications ==
- Fish, Marie Poland (1926). "Preliminary Note on the Egg and Larva of the American Eel (Anguilla rostrata)". Science. 64 (1662): 455–456. Bibcode:1926Sci....64..455P. doi:10.1126/science.64.1662.455. ISSN 0036-8075. JSTOR 1651252. PMID 17741951.
- Fish, Marie Poland (1956). "Animal Sounds in the Sea". Scientific American. 194 (4): 93–104. Bibcode:1956SciAm.194d..93F. doi:10.1038/scientificamerican0456-93. ISSN 0036-8733. JSTOR 26171975. S2CID 4146421.
- Fish, Marie Poland (1970). Sounds of western North Atlantic fishes; a reference file of biological underwater sounds. William H. Mowbray. Baltimore: Johns Hopkins Press. ISBN 0-8018-1130-9. OCLC 92568.

== Awards ==
- Navy Distinguished Public Service Award (1966)
