= Sulphur Crisis of 1840 =

Diplomatic dispute between Britain and Sicily

Date	9 April 1840–21 July 1840
Location	Kingdom of the Two Sicilies
Result	Cancellation of French contract, several merchantships detained and searched

Belligerents
United Kingdom	Two Sicilies

Commanders and leaders
(United Kingdom of Great Britain and Ireland) Lord Palmerston (United Kingdom of Great Britain and Ireland) Robert Stopford	(Kingdom of the Two Sicilies) Ferdinand II of the Two Sicilies

The Sulphur Crisis of 1840 (also known as the Sulphur War of 1840 or Anglo-Neapolitan Sulphur Crisis) was a diplomatic dispute between the United Kingdom and the Kingdom of the Two Sicilies. In the 19th century, the Sicilians maintained a large sulphur mining industry and were responsible for most of the world's production. As a result of the Industrial Revolution, British demand for sulphur increased considerably. (Note: The Journal of the Statistical Society of London reported that sulphur imports to Britain rose from 4,650 tons in 1820 to 44,653 by 1838. Over the same time frame, British industrial consumption of sulphur rose from 5,602 to 33,978 tons annually.) Britain had a very favourable treaty with the Two Sicilies that had been negotiated in 1816. The crisis occurred when Ferdinand II of the Two Sicilies gave a monopoly over the Sicilian sulphur industry to a French firm, which the British argued violated the 1816 trade agreement. A peaceful resolution was eventually negotiated by France.

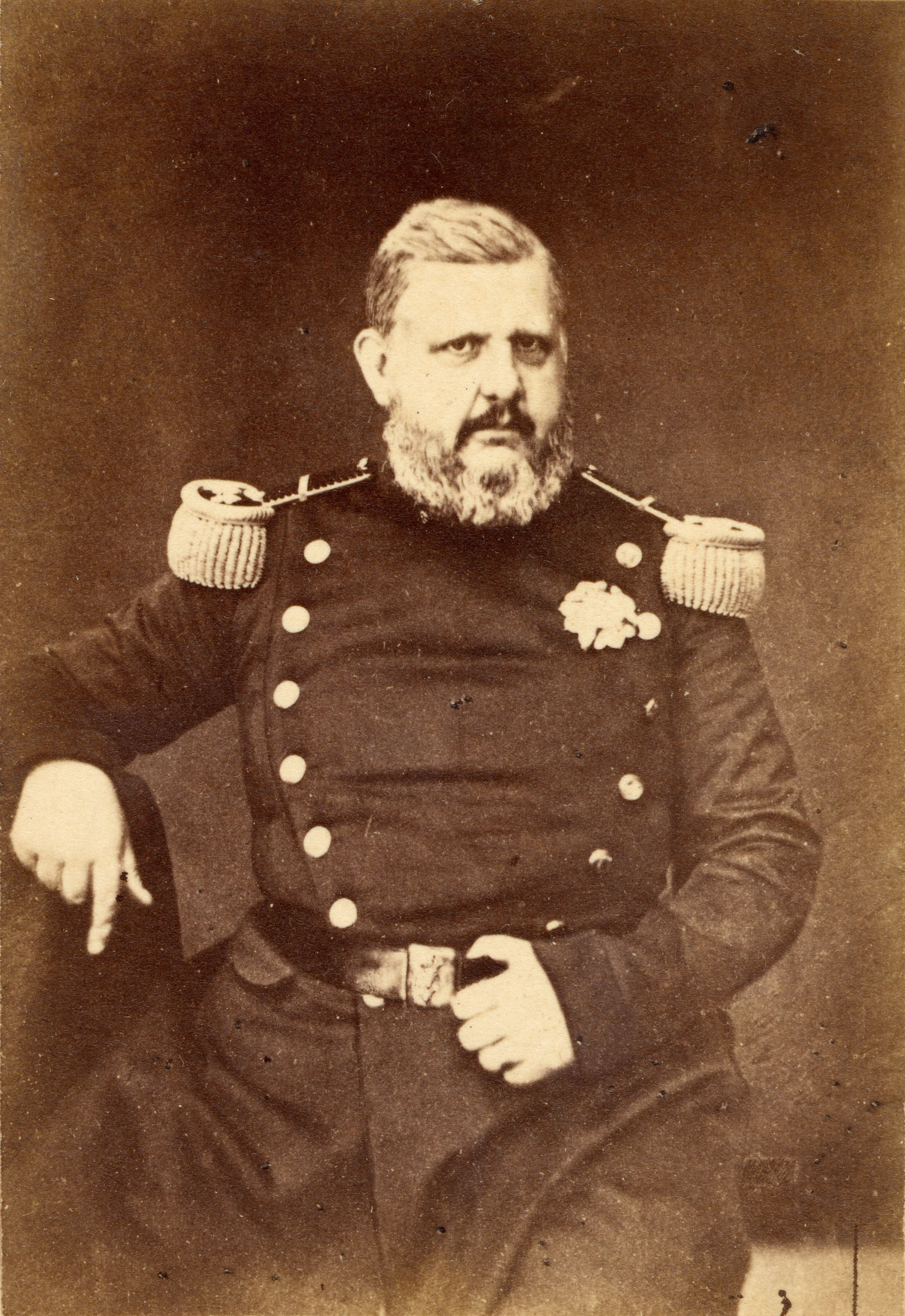
Ferdinand II

== Background ==
Sulphuric acid is one of the most important chemicals in the world. It is used to manufacture fertiliser, and is also important in mineral processing and oil refining. It has a wide range of end applications including as an electrolyte in lead-acid batteries and in dehydrating compounds. Demand surged during the Industrial Revolution, as the acid is used in finishing textiles. Between 1832 and 1836, sulphur production doubled. Until the invention of the Frasch process in 1891, sulphur extracted from volcanic rock in Sicily by the Sicilian method made up the vast majority of the world's production. In 1816, a treaty between the Two Sicilies and Great Britain was signed that gave British merchants large concessions, such as a 10% reduction in the customs duty due on imports from and exports to Britain, and gave British merchants a large advantage trading in Southern Italy. It also gave Britain most favoured nation status. The British defended their rights zealously and attempted to negotiate a new treaty that was even more favourable to them.

== Crisis ==
In 1836, then King of the Two Sicilies, Ferdinand II, began negotiating with French merchants an agreement granting French merchants control over the sulphur trade. An initial plan was submitted by French merchants Amato Taix and Arsene Aycard on 1 May 1836. Though many Sicilians supported the plan, it was abandoned after British resistance. In September 1837, Ferdinand II revived such talks with Taix and Aycard, regarding the production and export of sulphur. Ferdinand II was trying to encourage the price of sulphur to rise.

An agreement was approved by the Consulta—the kingdom's general council—on 15 December 1837, announced on 4 July 1838, and signed on 9 July. It gave the Frenchmen control over sulphur exports from Sicily. It was essentially a monopoly, making it unprofitable for any other merchants to trade sulphur. This angered the British, who had previously controlled the trade. The agreement immediately crippled sulphur imports to the United Kingdom which fell from 44,653 tons in 1838 to 22,160 tons in 1839. The price of the sulphur also increased by 100%.

British merchants argued that the new agreement violated the 1816 treaty, and claimed that their commercial interests were damaged. In response, Lord Palmerston, the British Foreign Secretary began attempting to convince the Sicilian government to reverse the agreement. Ferdinand II resisted Palmerston's efforts, arguing that both agreements were comparable, and recognising that the new agreement could be highly profitable for his kingdom. The former opinion was supported by contemporary jurists Frederick Pollock and Joseph Phillimore. It was further impractical for Ferdinand II to cancel the contract, because if he did Taix and Aycard intended to claim £666,000 in compensation, a price that the kingdom would be hard pressed to pay.

"The outcome of this affair is not difficult to foresee: It will end as every quarrel between the powerful and the weak, by the submission of the latter, and Europe will assist in it without being troubled by it.

— Albert Wilhelm Laurens Heldwier, Dutch envoy in Turin.

On 23 February Ferdinand gave his minister, Prince de Cassaro, permission announce the cancellation of the contract. However, it never happened. In mid-March, the British warned that if their wishes were not met, they would establish a blockade and begin seizing merchant ships of the Sicilies. Reasoning that the kingdom's coastline was too large to effectively blockade, Ferdinand II refused to give in. Cassaro resigned from his post in frustration. Ferdinand II then began preparing for war. Palmerston ordered the British Mediterranean Fleet under Admiral Robert Stopford to leave Malta and travel to the kingdom, and in April it began seizing ships. Though there was no formal declaration of war, the 'Sulphur War' is generally accepted to have begun in April. Several Neapolitan merchants were searched and detained, but there were no direct naval confrontations between the two nations.

The Austrian statesman Klemens von Metternich urged the two parties to avoid all-out war, writing to the Sicilian diplomat Marquis de Gagliati: "Marquis, you must agree that it is hardly worth having a European war over a question of sulphur!" Metternich criticised Ferdinand for being unwilling to negotiate, and then tried to convince him to cancel the contract. In contrast to Metternich's efforts to negotiate, which were rejected, a similar offer by the French prime minister Adolphe Thiers was accepted by the British on 10 April and the Sicilians on 26 April. Also in late April, Stopford released the ships he had been holding and halted further seizures. As negotiations dragged on, Palmerston warned that seizures would resume if the contract was not cancelled by 20 July 1840. Ferdinand cancelled the contract on 21 July, and eight days later Stopford's fleet returned to Malta. In December, British merchants were awarded 121,454 ducats out of the requested 373,978. The French were awarded 44,000 out of the requested 233,433 in 1844.

== Notes ==
Notes

Citations
