= Union Sulphur Company =

1896 American sulphur mining company

- House flag
- Industry: mining, shipping
- Founded: 1896, New Jersey
- Successor: Union Sulphur & Oil Company; Union Oil & Gas Corporation; Union Texas Natural Gas Corporation; Allied Chemical Corporation; BP
- Headquarters: Sulphur, Louisiana; New York City
- Key people: Herman Frasch; Herman Whiton
- Products: sulfur

The Union Sulphur Company was an American sulfur mining corporation founded in 1896 by the famous inventor Herman Frasch. It utilized the Frasch Process to extract previously inaccessible sulfur deposits located beneath swampland in Louisiana. The Union Sulphur Company dominated the world sulfur market until its patents expired in 1908. Its success led to the development of the present-day city of Sulphur, Louisiana. After its sulfur patents expired, the company transitioned into oil and natural gas production and was renamed the Union Sulphur & Oil Company and later the Union Oil & Gas Corporation.

During World War I, the company was a critical source of sulfur for the U.S. war effort. During World War II, the company operated at least twenty-seven Liberty Ships and was awarded a War Service Flag.

In 1960, the company merged with the Texas Natural Gas Corporation to form the Union Texas Natural Gas Corporation. In 1962, Union Texas was acquired by Allied Chemical Corporation. Through a series of transactions, the Union Texas division eventually became part of multinational energy company BP.

== Founding and development ==
=== Frasch at Standard Oil ===
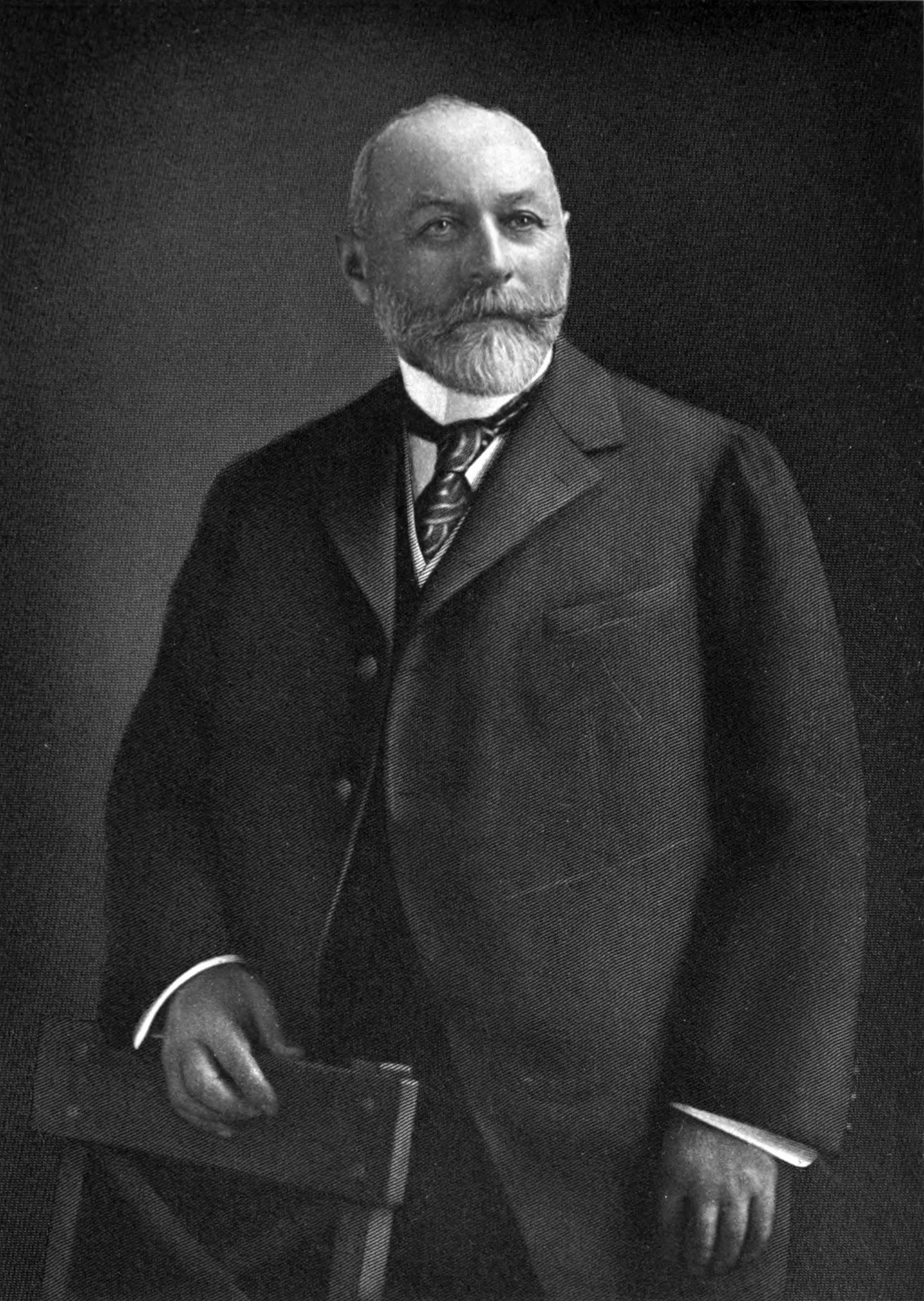
Herman Frasch

Herman Frasch was a German immigrant to America who eventually settled in Cleveland, Ohio. He was a chemist and engineer who devised a number of inventions.

In 1885, he founded the Empire Oil Company and began perfecting a method for removing sulfur from sour crude oil. The presence of sulfur in oil causes it to smell noxious and release excessive soot as it burns, making the oil virtually useless for many purposes. John D. Rockefeller's Standard Oil company owned fields of oil that contained sulfur. The oil would become far more valuable if the sulfur were removed, so Standard Oil purchased Frasch's company and employed him as the first head of its research department. Frasch perfected his method for removing sulfur from oil, resulting in a financial windfall for Standard Oil.

=== Calcasieu Parish sulfur deposits thwart miners ===
As early as 1867, organized efforts were made by various concerns to extract oil and sulfur located beneath a 50-acre hill rising out of a bayou in Calcasieu Parish, Louisiana. The swamp water surrounding the hill contained traces of oil, leading prospectors to believe they could drill productive oil wells. In 1867, the Louisiana Petroleum Company began exploratory drilling at the site. Drilling revealed that beneath 400 feet of clay and gravel was a layer of quicksand, followed by a 100-foot thick bed of limestone containing pure sulfur deposits, underlain by gypsum. The exploratory drilling continued down to 1,230 feet, still within the gypsum layer, without finding any significant oil deposits.

For the next 23 years, a series of corporations aided by esteemed experts such as Professor Eugene W. Hilgard, noted French engineer Antoine Granet, Rossiter W. Raymond, and Richard P. Rothwell, attempted to mine the sulfur deposits. Hilgard and Granet confirmed that about 450 feet below the surface was a 100-foot-thick layer of limestone impregnated with pure sulfur. A 25-foot thick layer of limestone kept the sulfur separated from the watery layers above. If a mine shaft could be built through the watery layers, down to the limestone and sulfur, miners could descend and dig caverns laterally to extract the sulfur. The problem was that any mine shaft would flood with water and quicksand as it was built.

Granet proposed digging straight down and building a mine shaft supported by 87 iron rings, 10 feet in diameter and 5 feet high. When the shaft reached the limestone, the water would be pumped out. Miners could then descend through the shaft and dig lateral shafts within the limestone. This method was attempted first by the Calcasieu Sulphur & Mining Company in 1870, and later the Louisiana Sulphur Company in 1879, followed by the American Sulphur Company in 1890. All such efforts ended with flooded shafts. The last effort by the American Sulphur Company released deadly hydrogen sulfide gas that killed five drillers, and the efforts were abandoned.

=== The Frasch process succeeds ===
As the American Sulphur Company was abandoning its efforts, Frasch, with the backing of Frank Rockefeller, Feargus B. Squire and Louis Severance, was on an adjacent property beginning his own efforts. Frasch had learned about the well-publicized sulfur mining failures, and purchased land adjacent to the American Sulphur Company's land. He assumed that the sulfur deposits extended laterally underneath his property, and he planned to extract the sulfur with a new method. He would insert three pipes down into the sulfur. Super-heated water would be pumped down one pipe to melt the sulfur, and compressed air would be pumped down another pipe. The increased pressure from the compressed air would then force the molten sulfur up through the empty third pipe. Upon drilling on his property, however, Frasch discovered that the sulfur was only located beneath the American Sulphur Company property.

The American Sulfur Company was not a fly-by-night venture, but a credible corporation backed by Abram Hewitt, Edward Cooper and Hamilton McKown Twombly. It had spent $300,000 to $350,000 to buy the land and attempt to extract the sulfur. Frasch met with Hewitt and proposed a simple 50/50 deal combining their property with his process. Hewitt wanted greater assurances about the unproven extraction process, and Frasch went to work with engineers such as Jacques Toniette and Jacob Hoffman. On a day in late December 1894, the Frasch Process succeeded, and pure molten sulfur rose up from beneath the bayou, and within 15 minutes the 40 barrels on hand to collect it were full.

On January 23, 1896, the Union Sulphur Company was incorporated in New Jersey to take title to the land and Frasch patents. Half the stock went to the American Sulphur Company, and the other half went to Frasch and his backers. Frasch and his engineering team worked through various technical challenges, but work stalled because of irregular production, and the high cost of the coal necessary to heat the water caused the operation to lose money. The venture was on the verge of failure. Frasch met with Abram Hewitt and Edward Cooper and asked for more financial support. They were skeptical, but also present at the meeting was Hewitt's wife Sarah Cooper Hewitt, sister of Edward Cooper. She announced that she would personally back Frasch if her husband and brother would sell her their stakes in the company. Her faith in Frasch won them over, and they continued to back the venture.

=== The Union Sulphur Company dominates the global sulfur market ===
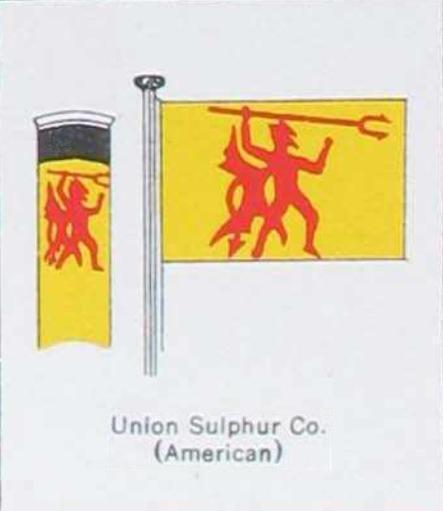
Union Sulphur Co. House Flag

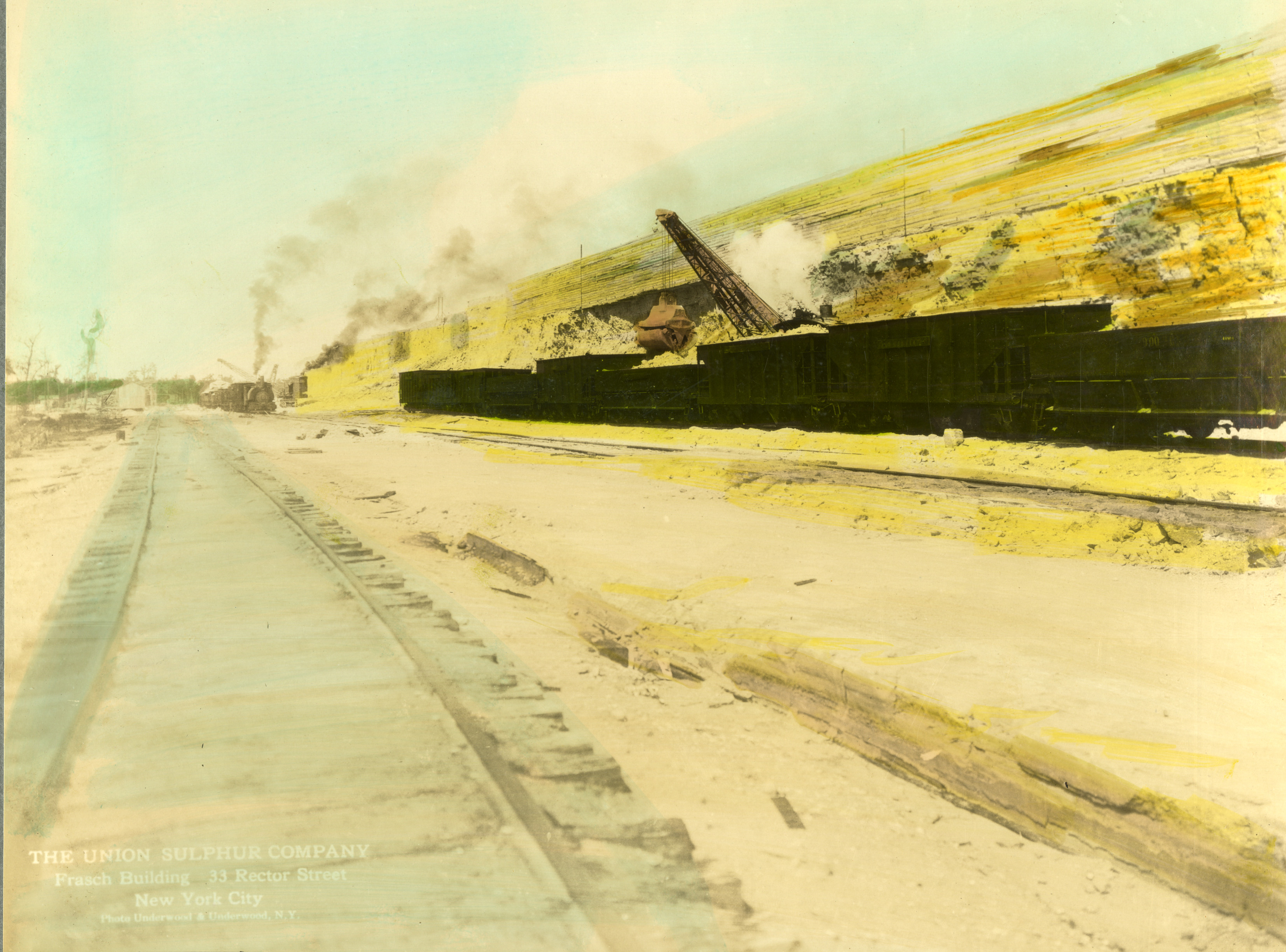
Loading sulphur into railcars for transport to Union Sulphur Co. wharf

The fuel cost problem was solved by simple good fortune. On January 10, 1901, a huge oil field was discovered at Spindletop, not far from the Union Sulphur Company's drilling site. The Union Sulphur Company now had easy access to cheap energy, making the sulfur mining process highly profitable. Production increased from 2 wells producing 3078 long tons in 1901 to 19 wells producing 218,950 tons in 1905. By 1912, production increased to 787,735 tons, of which 57,736 were exported. As importantly, costs were one-fifth that of sulphur from Sicily, which had previously dominated the industry. The Union Sulphur Company quickly came to dominate the global sulfur market, .

=== The Frasch patents expire ===
Unfortunately for Frasch, he was too far ahead of his time. He had filed his original two patents (Note: US461,429 (Oct 20, 1891) - Mining Sulphur; US461,430 (Oct 20, 1891) - Apparatus for Mining Sulphur) for the Frasch Process back in 1891. At the time, patents lasted 17 years. His original patents thus expired in 1908. Competitors such as the Freeport Sulphur Company quickly emerged and began to use the Frasch Process to extract sulfur from other nearby salt dome sites. The Union Sulphur Company tried to stop the Freeport Sulphur Company by suing on the basis of later patents that improved upon the original patents. (Note: US799,642 (Sep 19, 1905) - Process of Mining Sulphur; US800,127 (Sep 19, 1905) - Apparatus for Mining Sulphur; US1,008,319 (Nov 14, 1911) - Mining Sulphur) The Delaware District Court largely sided with the Union Sulphur Company. The Third Circuit Court of Appeals, however, reversed the district court, concluding that the new patents were not really new inventions, but merely extensions of the original expired patents. Union Sulphur appealed to the Supreme Court, which declined to review the Third Circuit opinion. The competitors were free to use the Frasch Process.

The Union Sulphur Company continued to extract sulfur, averaging over 200,000 tons per year from 1905 to 1911 and eventually producing a total of almost 9.5 million tons.

== Union Sulphur Company critical to U.S. war effort during World War I ==
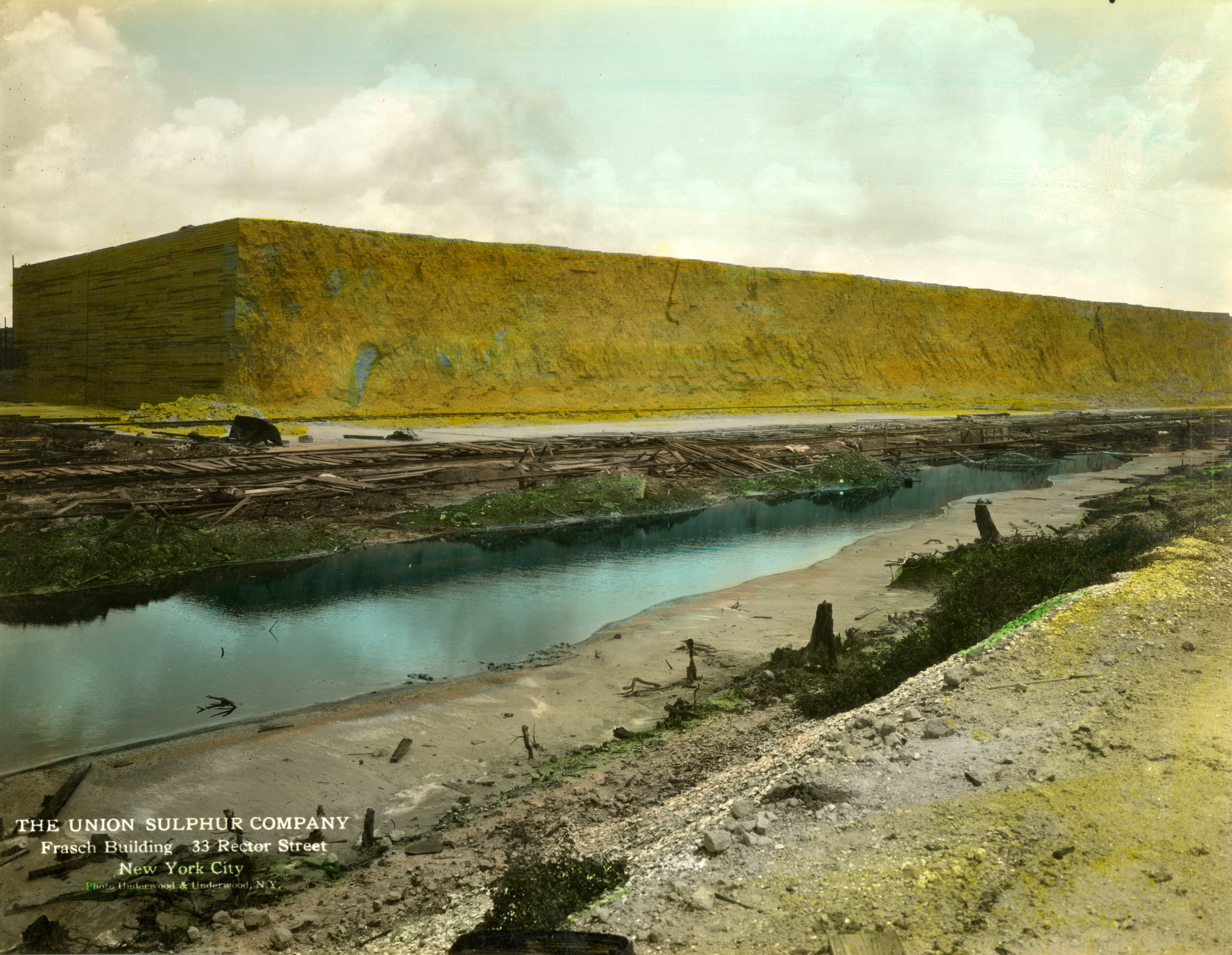
Reserve sulphur storage with retaining walls removed. This solid block of sulphur is fifty two feet high and contains more than one million tons.

Sulfur has many industrial uses, including as sulfuric acid and in the manufacture of explosives, among others. The Union Sulphur Company, as the primary source of sulfur in the U.S. before and during World War I, was critical to the U.S. war effort. As the legal battle over the expiration of its patents continued, the company's daily output of sulfur rose from 700 tons per day to over 4,000 tons per day to meet the U.S.'s and its Allies' wartime needs of 150,000 tons per month. The U.S. government exerted control over domestic sulfur distribution during the War, but did not exert control over its production.

== Transition to oil and gas; mergers and acquisitions ==
By 1929, the company's original sulfur mines were depleted, but the company had located oil near the edge of the salt dome where it mined sulfur. The company thereafter acquired additional properties for sulfur mining, but gradually transitioned to oil and natural gas extraction in Louisiana, Mississippi and Texas. In 1950, the company changed its name to the Union Sulphur & Oil Corporation to reflect its transition to oil production.

In 1955, the name was changed to the Union Oil & Gas Corporation. In 1960, the Union Oil & Gas Co. merged with the Texas Natural Gas Corporation to form the Union Texas Natural Gas Corporation. In 1962, Union Texas merged with Allied Chemical. Through a series of transactions the Union Texas division eventually became part of multinational energy company BP.

== Executives and directors ==
=== John L. Henning ===
A native of Calcasieu Parish, Henning was the assistant manager of the Company from 1899 until 1915, when he became vice president and general manager overseeing much of the company's operations.

=== William R. Keever ===
Keever was hired in January 1905 to supervise drilling for the company. He had prior drilling experience from Jennings Oil Field and Sour Lake Oil Field. He remained with the company for twenty years, becoming a vice president and general manager.

=== Clarence A. Snider ===
Served as Secretary and Treasurer of the Union Sulphur Company beginning in 1907.

=== John L. Severance ===
Son of company investor Louis Severance, John Severance was a successful entrepreneur in his own right.

=== Henry D. Whiton ===
Henry D. Whiton served as president of the Union Sulphur Company from 1905-1914. Although his hiring likely resulted from his marriage to Herman Frasch's daughter Frieda Frasch, prior to their marriage Whiton had distinguished himself as an executive with Charles F. Brush's Brush Electric Company. Whiton had worked at the Brush Electric Co. for twelve years, with much of his time spent in Italy working on construction of the company's electric plants.

Whiton was a supporter of the New York Zoological Society, now called the Wildlife Conservation Society. He became a member of its executive committee in 1924 and vice president in 1925.

=== Herman Whiton ===
Herman Whiton, son of Frieda Frasch and Henry D. Whiton, served as president of the company and chairman of the board until 1952. He was a supporter of the Princeton University Physics Department, and was instrumental in its acquisition of a Synchrotron.

=== John R. Gordon ===
Gordon oversaw transportation at the company, including its fleet of ships. He served as President of the United States Shipping Board Merchant Fleet Corporation. He died in 1930.

=== William A. M. Burden ===
Burden was a director of the company. Burden, a descendant of Cornelius Vanderbilt, founded the investing firm William A. M. Burden & Company. He served as the U.S. Ambassador to Belgium and as president of the Museum of Modern Art in New York City.

== Union Sulphur Company ships ==
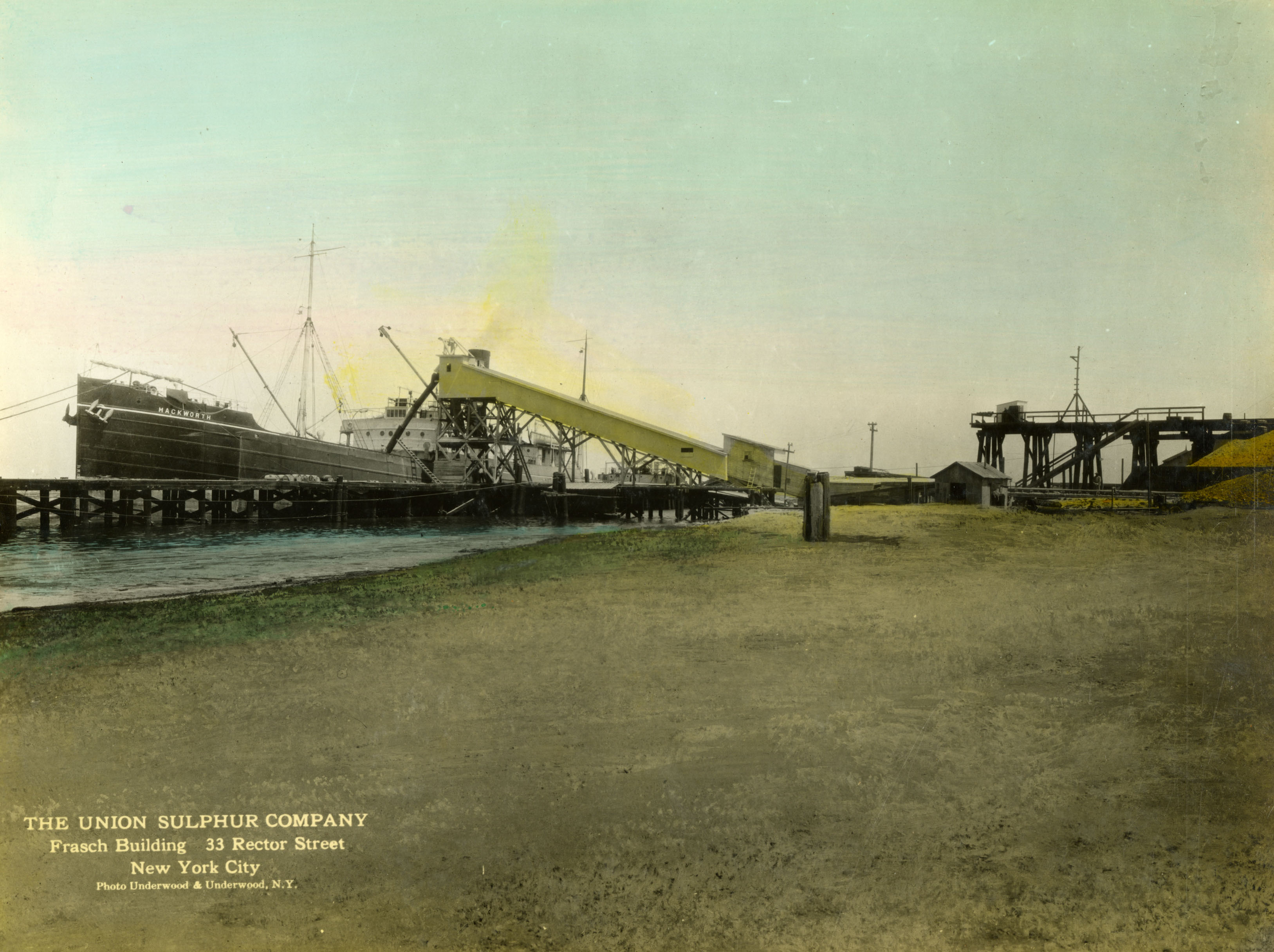
Union Sulphur Co. wharf at Sabine.

The company utilized ships to transport sulfur from its wharf at the Sabine River. The company first chartered ships, including the Cora F. Cressey in 1907. In 1899 the company purchased its first ship, the USS Hector, which was previously named Pedro and had been captured by the U.S. Navy during the Spanish–American War. The company later had its own ships built.

=== SS Arcturus ===
Arcturus was built as the cargo ship Clio by Pacific American Fisheries, Inc., Bellingham, Washington, one of seven wooden-hull Design 1065 ships built for the Emergency Fleet Corporation of the United States Shipping Board. The ship was launched March 22, 1919. The ship was 2,478 gross register tons (GRT), 268.3 ft (81.8 m) registered length with official number 218749, call letters LSKQ. Clio was operated by States Steamship until returned to Pacific American Fisheries after World War I. In September 1921 the ship was sold to Union Sulphur Company.

Union Sulphur Co. President Henry D. Whiton was a patron of the New York Zoological Society, now called the Wildlife Conservation Society. In 1925, Whiton provided the American naturalist and explorer William Beebe with Arcturus for a six month scientific voyage, the Arcturus Oceanographic Expedition, to the Galápagos Islands on behalf of the New York Zoological Society. The expedition was also supported by Harrison Williams. The expedition identified many new species. Beebe also observed a volcanic eruption between two nameless mountains, and named the mountains Mount Whiton and Mount Williams after his two benefactors. (Today they are known as Volcán Wolf and Volcán Darwin, respectively.) In 1926, Beebe authored a book about the expedition called The Arcturus Adventure. The official photographer on the expedition was Ernest B. Schoedsack. The official historian on the expedition was Ruth Rose. The two later married, and Schoedsack would go on to co-direct the film King Kong with Ruth Rose editing the screenplay. Arcturus is shown as owned by Beebe after the donation until the ship was sold to Portugal and later broken up in 1932.

=== SS Herman Frasch ===
==== First Herman Frasch ====
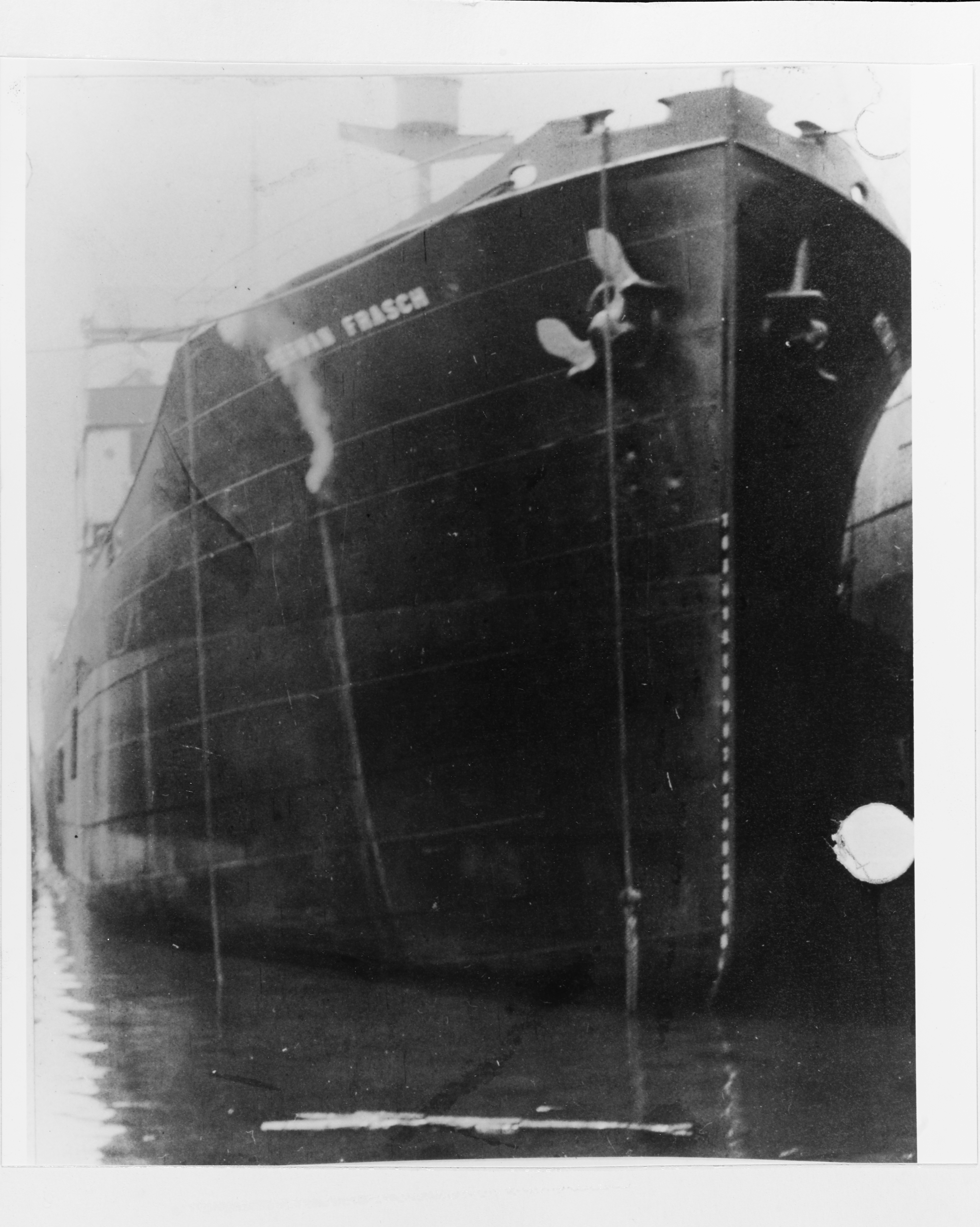
The SS Herman Frasch, commissioned by the U.S. Navy in September 1918 as USS Herman Frasch (ID # 1617)

Built in 1910 by Fore River Shipyard for the Union Sulphur Co. She was a 3,800 gross ton bulk carrier. She served as the USS Herman Frasch (ID No. 1617) during World War I, beginning in September 1918. On the night of October 4, 1918, she and the USS George G. Henry accidentally collided, causing the much smaller Herman Frach to sink. She went down in only seven minutes, and twenty-five of her crew were lost.

==== Second Herman Frasch ====
Built in 1920 by Newburgh Shipyards, Inc. for the Union Sulphur Co. She was a 4,500 gross ton bulk carrier. She was sold to the Italian Government in 1946 and renamed Auctoritas. She was scrapped in 1959.

==== Third Herman Frasch ====
Built in 1942 by Bethlehem Steel as the Liberty Ship SS Carter Braxton. She was operated by the Union Sulphur Co. during World War II. She was then purchased by the Union Sulphur Co. in 1947 and renamed Herman Frasch. She was sold to the Terminal Steamship Company in 1955, and was later sold to a Liberian concern, and then a Greek concern that renamed her Meltemi. She was scrapped in Taiwan in 1959.

=== SS Frieda ===
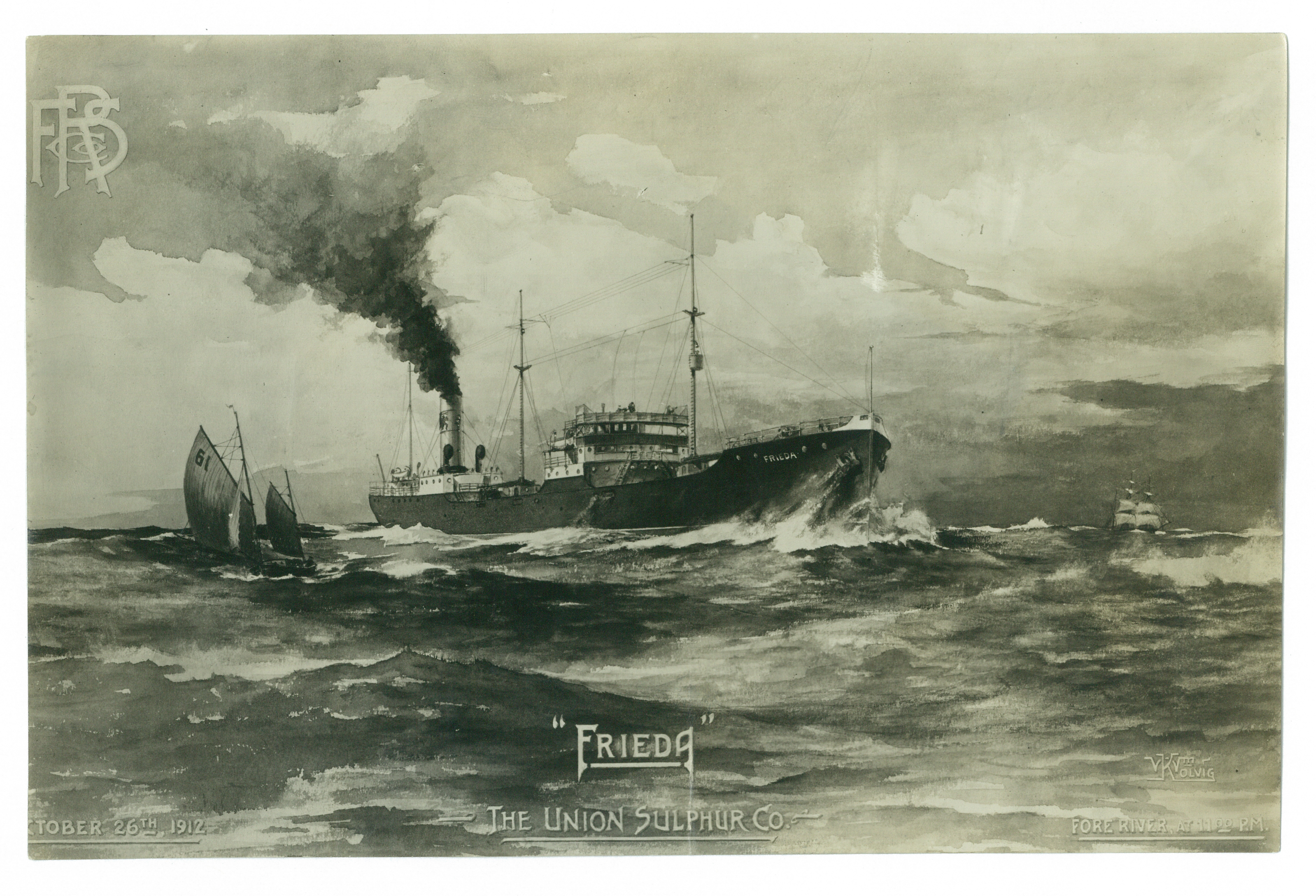
Painting celebrating the 1912 launch of the SS Frieda at the Fore River Shipyard in Quincy, Massachusetts

Built in 1912 by the Fore River Shipyard for the Union Sulphur Co. She was a 3,365 gross ton bulk carrier. She was named after Frasch's daughter Frieda Frasch. She served as the USS Frieda during World War I, from October 1918 to January 1919. She was later sold to a Chinese concern and renamed Peh Shan, and later Norse Carrier. On December 8, 1941, during the Second Sino-Japanese War, she was captured by Japan at Shanghai and renamed Sana Maru. She was operated by Japan during World War II until October 20, 1943, when she was sunk off the coast of French Indochina by the American Gato-class submarine USS Kingfish.

=== SS Hewitt ===
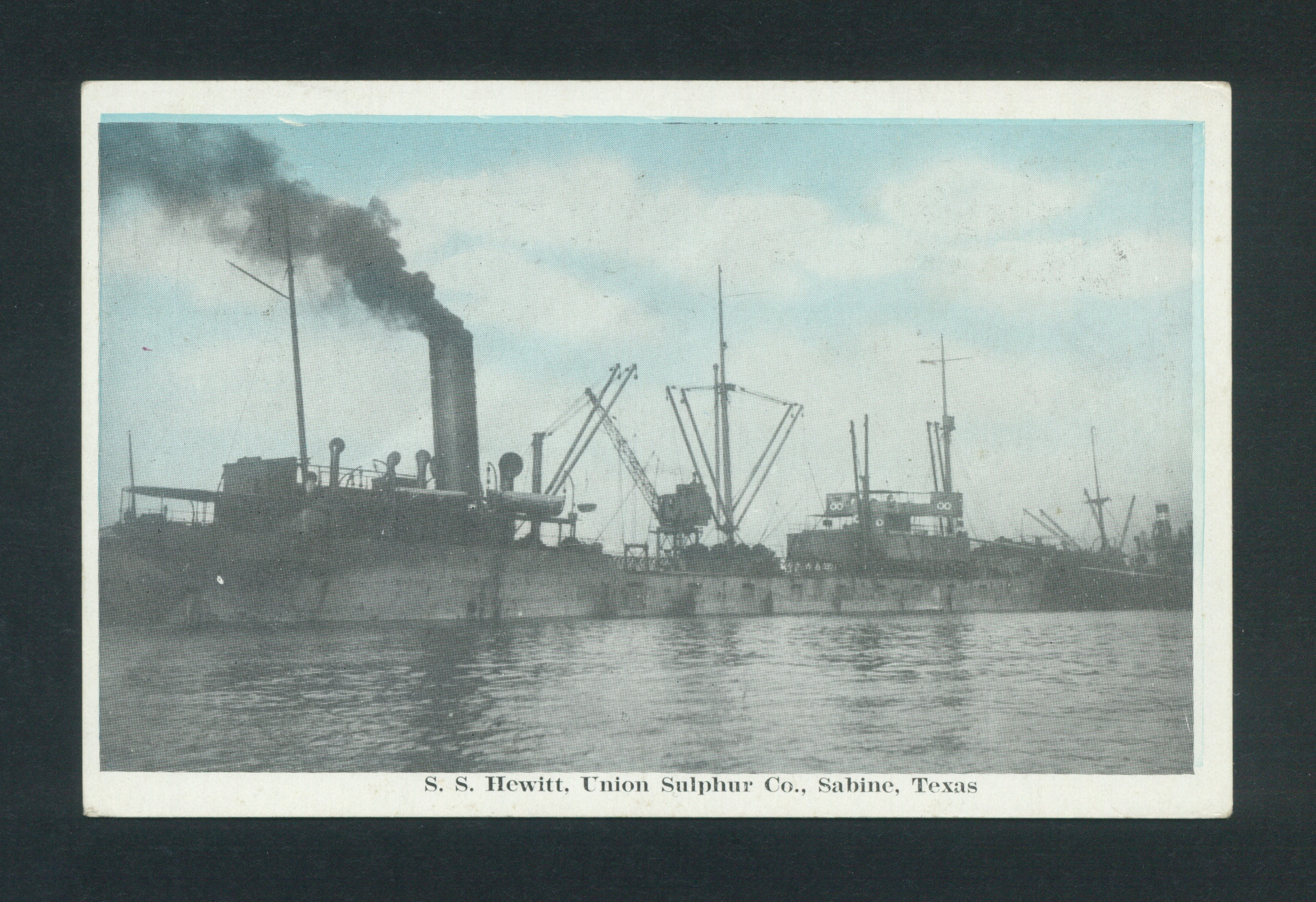
Post Card of SS Hewitt, Union Sulphur Co. ship

Built in 1914 by the Fore River Shipyard as Pacific for the J. S. Emery Steamship Co. She was a 5,400 gross ton bulk carrier. In 1915, she was purchased by the Union Sulphur Co. for $700,000 (~$15.7 million in 2024) and renamed Hewitt, after company investor Abram Hewitt. She served as the USS Hewitt during World War I, from 1917 to 1919.

In January 1921, Hewitt and her entire crew disappeared without a trace off the northeastern coast of Florida. Only days after this unexplained disappearance, the commercial schooner Carroll A. Deering was discovered run aground on shoals off the coast of Cape Hatteras, North Carolina. Her entire crew had disappeared and were never found. These incidents were believed to have occurred in roughly the same area, which was also the area where in 1918 the USS Cyclops and her entire crew of three hundred and six disappeared without a trace. The three unexplained incidents resulted in a public outcry about possible threats from pirates, communists, and other conspiracy theories. The controversy led to investigations by five agencies of the U.S. federal government. The disappearances were never explained, causing them to become part of Bermuda Triangle lore.

=== SS Severance ===
Built in 1909 by Roper & Sons as Gladstone for a Norwegian concern. She was a 5,000 gross ton bulk carrier. She was purchased by the Union Sulphur Co. in 1917 and renamed Severance, after company investor Louis Severance. She served as the USS Severance (ID No. 2063) during the First World War, from August 19, 1918 to March 3, 1919. She was sold in 1927 and renamed Yankee Sword. She was scrapped in Philadelphia in 1949.

=== SS Henry D. Whiton ===
Built in 1912 by Newburgh Shipyards, Inc. for the Union Sulphur Co. She was a 4,500 gross register ton bulk carrier. She was named after Union Sulphur Co. President Henry D. Whiton. She served as the USS Henry D. Whiton (ID No. D-4811) in World War II, from January 21, 1942 through March 2, 1946. She participated in almost eighty convoys, including Convoy TAG 5. She was sold to the Italian Government in 1946 and scrapped in 1959.

=== SS C.A. Snider ===
Built in 1917 by Harlan and Hollingsworth as Olean for the Vacuum Oil Company. She was given a U.S. Navy number (ID No. SP-1630), indicating she may have served in the U.S. Navy during World War I. She was purchased by the Union Sulphur Co. in 1919 and renamed C.A. Snider, after company Secretary Clarence A. Snider. She was sold in 1929, and subsequently sold and renamed a number of times before being scrapped in 1962.

=== SS Herman F. Whiton ===
==== First Herman F. Whiton ====
Built in 1919 by Northwest Steel as J.R. Gordon. She was a 5,700 gross ton bulk carrier. She was named after Union Sulphur Co. executive J.R. Gordon, who oversaw the company's fleet of ships. In 1930, she was renamed the Herman F. Whiton, after Union Sulphur Co. President Herman Whiton. She was purchased by the U.S. government in March 1945 for $361,753.60 (~$4.98 million in 2024), and given to Russia as part of the Lend-Lease policy. She was renamed Tomsk and later scrapped in 1959.

==== Second Herman F. Whiton ====
The second Herman F. Whiton was built during World War II to serve the American war effort. She was built in 1943 by Kaiser Permanente as the T2 Tanker Oregon Trail. She was purchased by the Union Sulphur Co. in 1948 and renamed Herman F. Whiton, after Union Sulphur Co. President Herman Whiton. The company also bought T2 Tanker Brookfield, and renamed her William A.M. Burden after company Director William A.M. Burden. In 1949, both tankers were sold to Aristotle Onassis's Olympic Whaling Co. The Herman F. Whiton was renamed Olympic Challenger and operated as a factory whaling mother ship. The William A.M. Burden was later sold to Pacific Tankers Inc. and renamed Petronorte. The Olympic Challenger was later sold to Japanese whaling firm Kyokuyo Hogei and renamed Kyokuyo Maru 2.

=== SS W.R. Keever ===
Built in 1920 by Newburgh Shipyards, Inc. as Exanthia. She was a 5,900 gross ton bulk carrier. She was purchased by the Union Sulphur Co. in 1934 and renamed W.R. Keever, after an executive at the company. She served during World War II, from May 1942 to March 1945. She participated in over forty convoys. She was purchased by the U.S. government in March 1945 for $356,343.66 (~$4.91 million in 2024), and given to Russia as part of the Lend-Lease policy. She was renamed Cheliabinsk.

== Service during World War II: Liberty Ships ==
During World War II, the Union Sulphur Co. operated at least twenty-seven Liberty Ships. This was far more ships than the company had ever before operated. The ships were owned by the U.S. government but operated by the company under a War Shipping Administration General Agency Agreement. The company had to supply crews and equipment, maintain the ships, and operate them at sea. The Union Sulphur Co. was awarded a War Service Flag by the War Service Administration. Liberty Ships operated by the Union Sulphur Co. include:

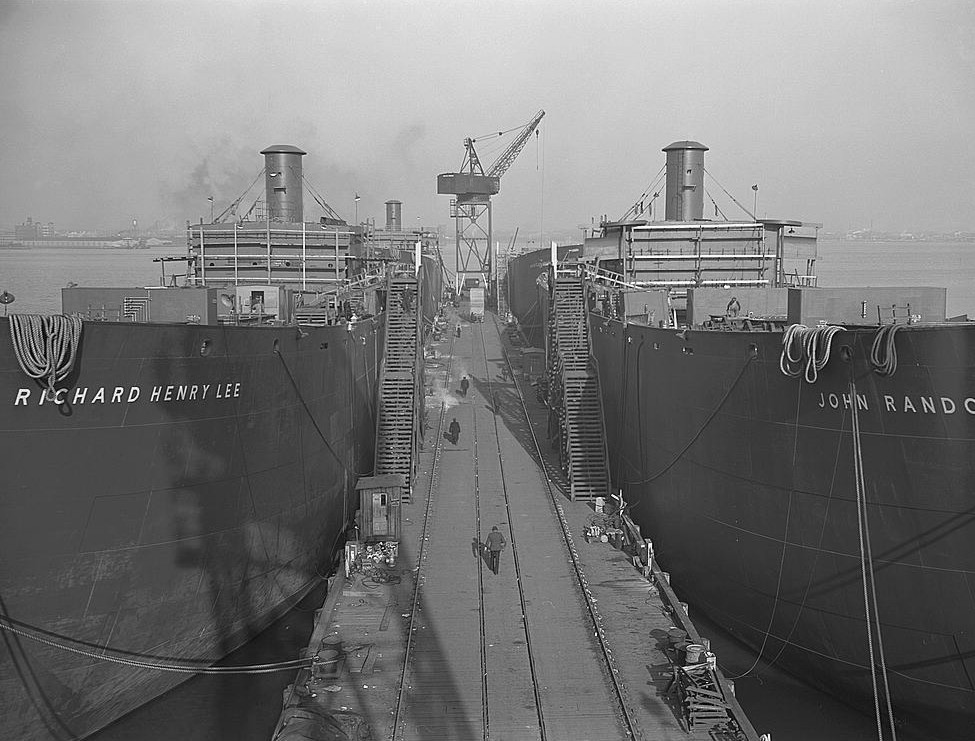
The Union Sulphur-operated John Randolph (at right) under construction

Ben Holladay, Benjamin H. Brewster, Benjamin F. Coston, Carter Braxton, Casper S. Yost, Chilton Seam, Cornelius Ford, Edward G. Acheson, Frederick C. Hicks, Fred C. Stebbins, F. Southall Farrar, Henry Ward Beecher, James W. Grimes, John Ball, John Randolph, Joseph A. Holmes, Moses Cleaveland, Robert Newell, Russell A. Alger, Samuel Colt, St. Olaf, Telfair Stockton, Thomas F. Hunt, Thomas Johnson, William Leroy Gable, William W. McKee, William Wolfskill.

The Union Sulphur Co. also operated the Victory Ship Goucher Victory during World War II.

== Brimstone Railroad & Canal Co. ==
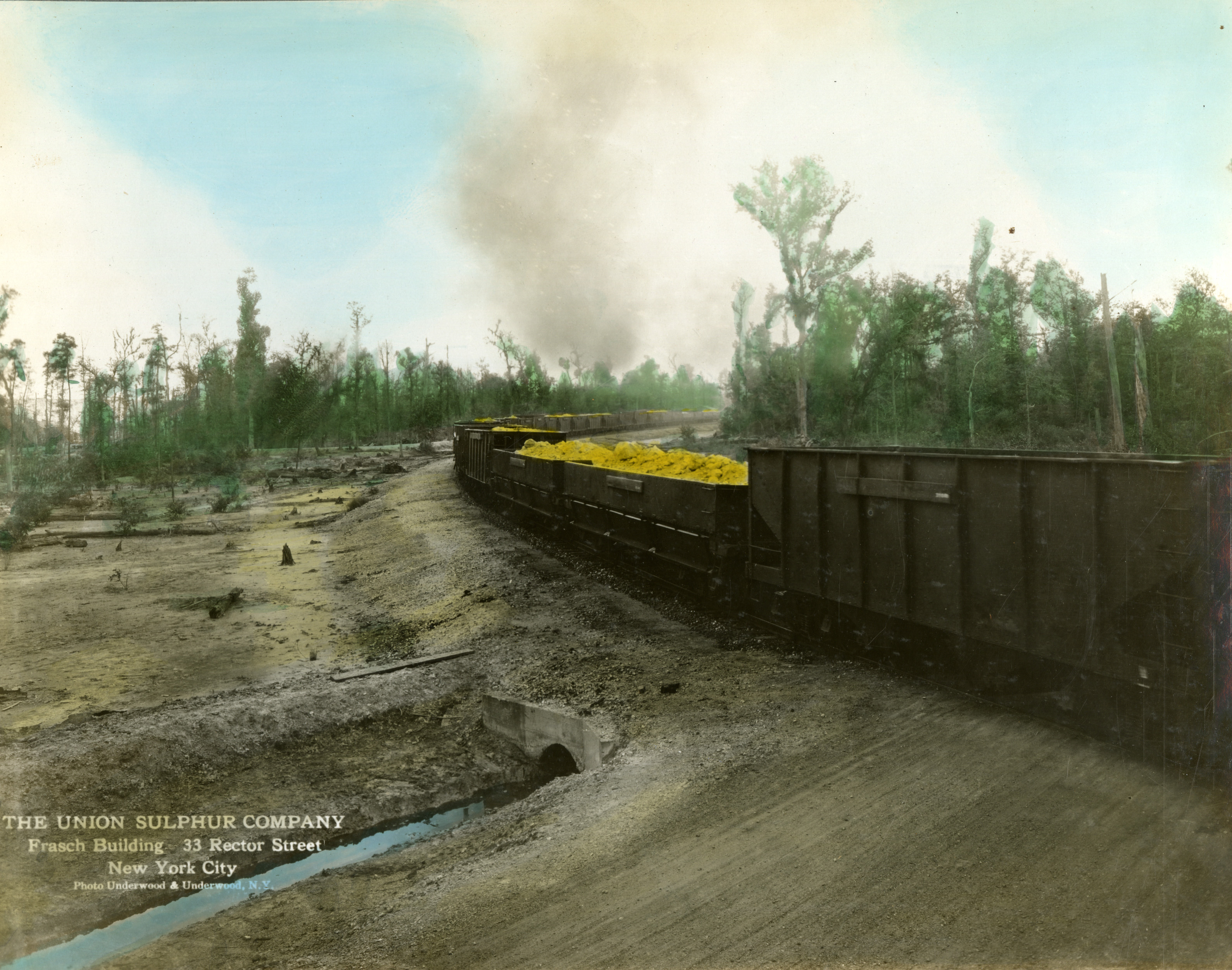
Railcars transporting sulphur from the mines.

On May 27, 1905, executives of the Union Sulphur Co. incorporated the Brimstone Railroad and Canal Company in Louisiana. The company was formed to build a railroad to run the seven miles from the mines to junctions that connected with the Southern Pacific Railway (now called the Southern Pacific Transportation Company) and the Kansas City Southern Railway. The Brimstone Railroad company had three locomotives and 106 cars. It also owned the Sabine River Canal, which provided a shipping channel to the Sabine River and Sabine Lake, and from there into the Gulf of Mexico.

== Statistics ==
Union Sulphur Co.
	Long Tons	Profits ($)
1903	23,715	
1904	79,187	
1905	218,950	
1906	287,590	
1907	185,882	
1908	367,896	2,284,480
1909	270,725	3,079,765
1910	246,510	3,326,480
1911	204,220	3,079,765
1912	786,605	4,285,792
1913	478,565	4,111,092
1914	804,470	4,034,846
1915	379,885	2,669,712
1916	383,465	6,613,842
1917	575,130	8,872,146
1918	978,700	13,033,265
1919	526,250	
