= SS Hewitt =

Ship that went missing in 1921

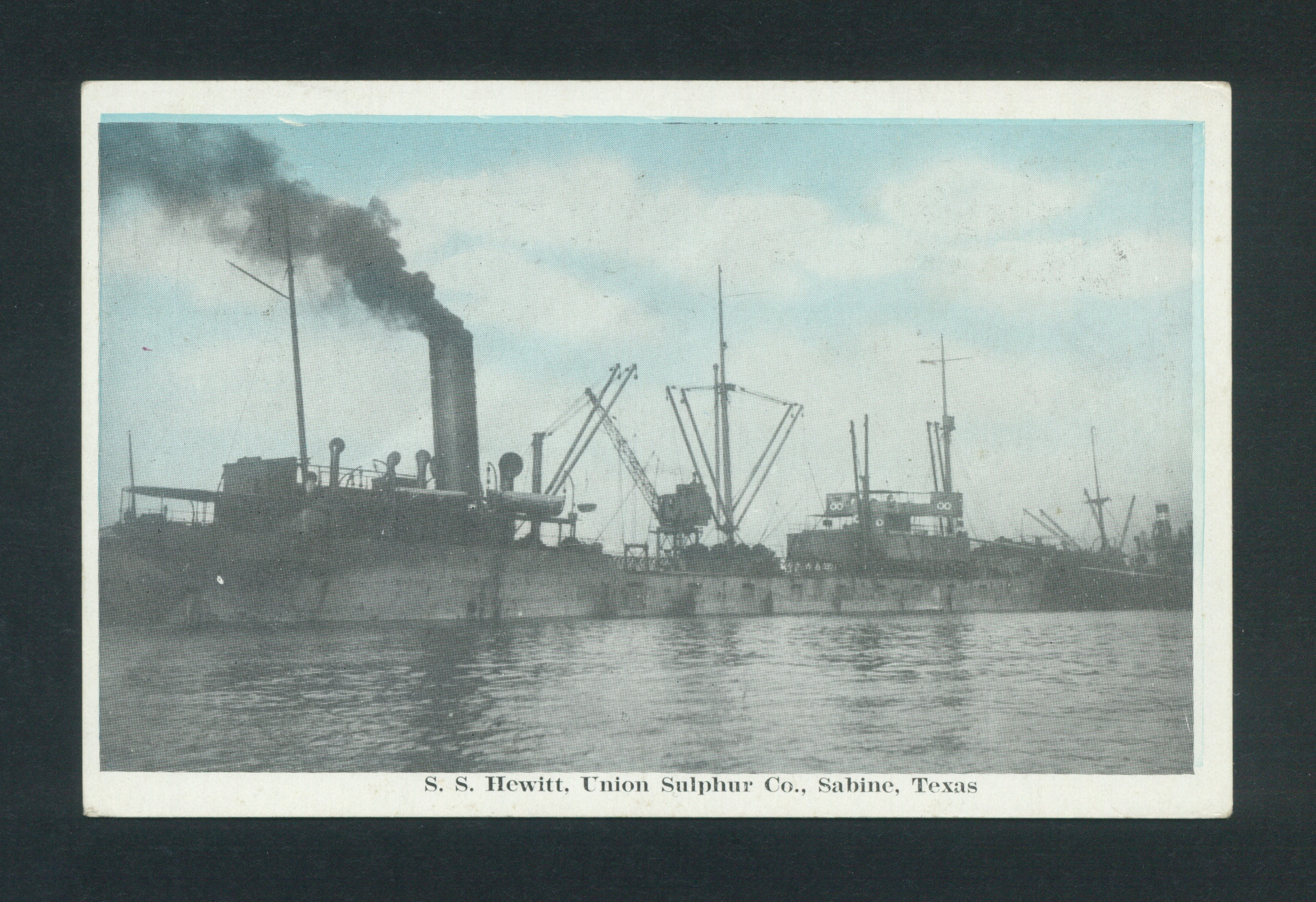

History
- Name: Pacific (1914–15); Hewitt (1915–21)
- Owner: J S Emery Steamship Co. (1914–15); Union Sulphur Company (1915–21)
- Port of registry: New York City, United States
- Builder: Fore River Shipbuilding Co
- Launched: 4 August 1914
- Completed: September 1914
- Out of service: January 1921
- Identification: United States Official Number 212560; Code Letters LDPG
- Fate: Missing since 26 January 1921

General characteristics
- Tonnage: 5,399 GRT, 3,395 NRT
- Length: 420 ft (128 m)
- Beam: 60 ft (18 m)
- Depth: 38 ft (12 m)
- Installed power: Triple expansion steam engine, 2,000 ihp
- Propulsion: Single screw propeller
- Speed: 12 knots (22 km/h)
- Crew: 42

The SS Hewitt was a steel welded and hulled bulk freighter built for the J. S. Emery Steamship Co. of Boston, Massachusetts, as the Pacific. (She had one sister ship named Atlantic.) She was sold to the Union Sulphur Company in 1915 and in 1921 she and her entire crew disappeared without a trace off the southeast coast of the United States.

== Description ==
The ship was 387 feet 7 inches (118.14 m) long, with a beam of 54 feet 3 inches (16.54 m) and a depth of 27 feet 7 inches (8.41 m). She was propelled by a triple expansion steam engine which had cylinders of 25 inches (64 cm), 41 inches (100 cm) and 68 inches (170 cm) diameter by 48 inches (120 cm) stroke. The engine was rated at 2,000 ihp. Steam was produced by three boilers, 13 feet 9 inches (4.19 m) diameter by 11 feet 11 inches (3.63 m) length, working at a pressure of 190 lb/in^{2}. The engine drove a single screw propeller, it could propel the ship at 12 knots (22 km/h). She was assessed at 5,399 GRT, 3,395 NRT.

== History ==
Pacific was built by the Fore River Shipbuilding Co. of Quincy, Massachusetts, for the J. S. Emery Steamship Co. Her port of registry was Boston, Massachusetts. She was delivered in September 1914. Pacific was purchased by the Union Sulphur Company in 1915. After a refit she was renamed Hewitt. The American Official Number 212560 was allocated. Her port of registry was changed to New York City. She was later allocated the Code Letters LDPG. Exactly what modifications, if any, Union Sulphur Co. made are unknown, but she probably remained mostly as she was built. The ship was described as "one of the largest bulk cargo carriers constructed in the United States."

Hewitt plied the route along the American east coast. During World War I she delivered sulfur to ammunition and chemical industries. Beginning on 9 August 1917, when the Navy requisitioned the ship in Newport News, Virginia and, continuing until the end of the war, she shipped war materials to various French Atlantic ports. During this time, she became the first U.S. merchant marine vessel fitted with a six-inch gun, designed for defense against German U-boats. Apparently, no war-related incidents were reported. After the war, she remained with Union Sulphur Co., returning to the company in Norfolk, Virginia on 26 February 1919.

In October 1920, the vessel was taken to Hoboken, New Jersey for an overhaul that lasted 45 days at a cost of $100,000. Following the overhaul, she was inspected and certified by the United States Steamboat Inspectors in Portland.

Under command of Capt. Hans Jakob Hansen, she left fully loaded from Sabine Pass, Port Arthur, Texas on 20 January 1921. She was bound for Portland, Maine with a stop in Boston, Massachusetts. She made her regular radio calls on 24 January and 25 January, and reported nothing unusual. She was last seen 250 nautical miles (460 km) north of Jupiter Inlet, Florida. From that time to this, she remains missing. No further radio signals from her were received. After the Hewitt failed to arrive in Boston on its expected due date of 29 January, Union Sulphur sent the ship's wireless call (K I L) through Atlantic coastal stations, and notified the United States Navy. A huge search along her route found nothing.

Initial hypotheses about the ship's disappearance were varied. Initially, Coast Guard officials in Atlantic City reported hearing an explosion and seeing a flash approximately 20 miles (32 km) offshore on the night of 3 February, and connected this event with the Hewitt. No further evidence linking this explosion to the Hewitt, however, was ever found. A British insurance company suggested that the Hewitt may have sunk in a collision with the Carroll A. Deering, another ship that vanished around the same time, but examinations of the Deering after it came ashore (without a crew) did not show damage consistent with a collision. Others speculated about piracy, perhaps connected with "Bolshevik raiders" in the aftermath of the Red Scare, although authorities discounted these suggestions. These concerns were fueled further because of the subsequent disappearance of several other vessels in nearby waters during 1921.

In the aftermath, families of the victims filed suit against Union Sulphur Co., seeking more than $100,000 in damages. In a representative case, two families in Portland received settlements of $2,500 each; the court deemed that the crew members were presumed drowned off Florida.

The Union Sulphur Company owned many ships. It eventually transitioned to oil and gas production and, through a series of transactions, became part of British multinational energy company BP.

== See also ==
- List of people who disappeared mysteriously at sea
