= Herman Frasch =

German chemist, mining engineer and inventor (1851–1914)

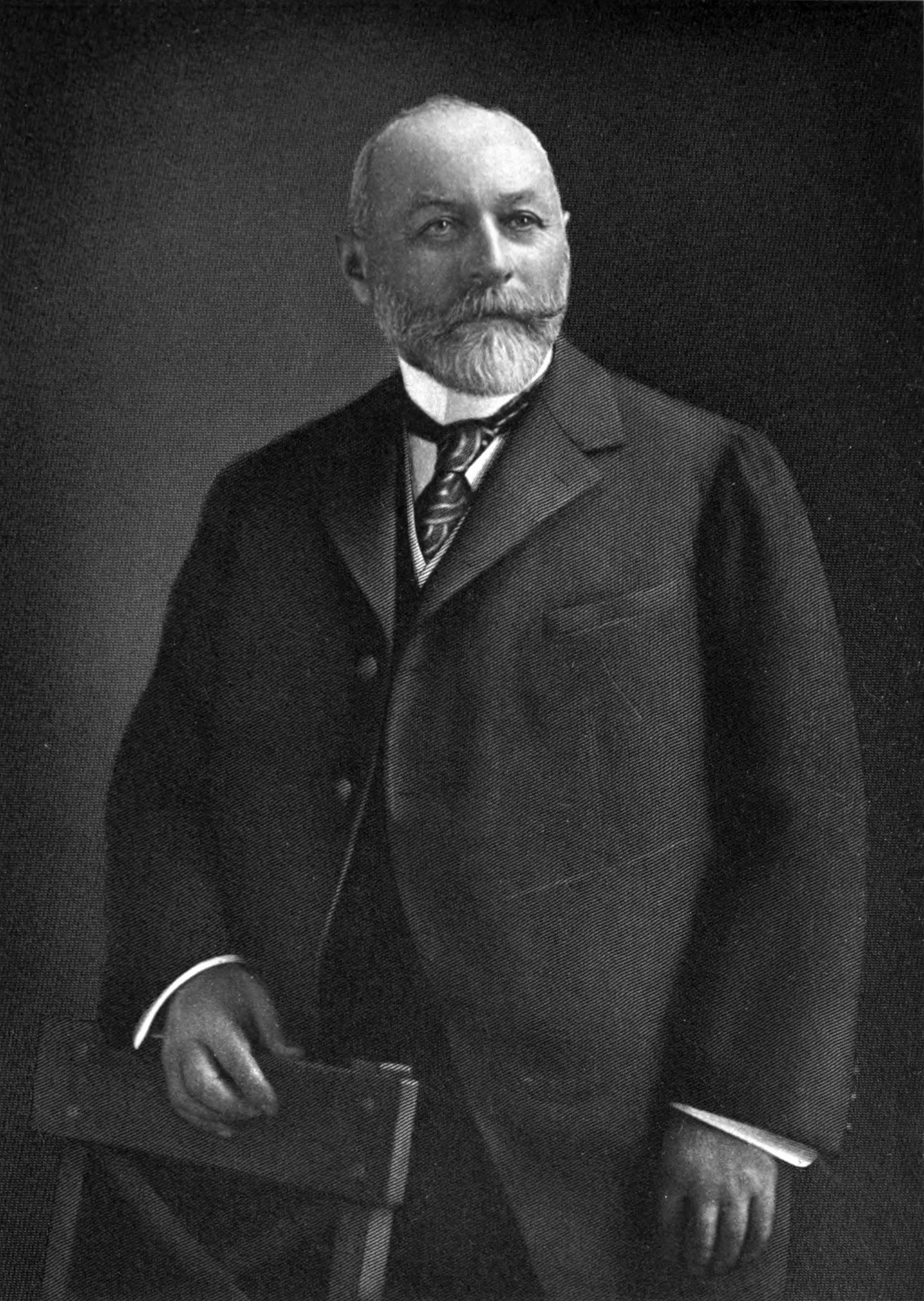
- Born: December 25, 1851; Oberrot bei Gaildorf, Württemberg
- Died: May 1, 1914 (aged 62); Paris
- Engineering career
- Projects: Frasch Process
- Awards: Perkin Medal (1912)

Herman Frasch (December 25, 1851 – May 1, 1914) was a Württemberger-born (German) American chemist, mining engineer and inventor known for his work with petroleum and sulfur.

== Biography ==
=== Early life ===
He was the son of Johannes and Frieda Henrietta (Bauer) Frasch. Both his parents were natives of Stuttgart. His father was burgomaster of Gaildorf. Herman attended the Latin school in Gaildorf and was then apprenticed to a bookseller in nearby Schwäbisch Hall. At the age of 16 or 19, he left the apprenticeship and sailed from Bremen to New York, then took the train to Philadelphia. After his arrival in the United States, he became a lab assistant to John Michael Maisch at the Philadelphia College of Pharmacy.

== Engineering career ==
=== Oil career ===
In 1875, Frasch invented a recovery process for tin scrap and process to make white lead from galena. He patented a process for refining paraffin wax in 1876, and sold the patent to Standard Oil, for whom he became a consulting chemist based in Cleveland.

In 1884, Frasch sold the exclusive use of his fractional distillation patent, which was more efficient at separating oil into by-products to Imperial Oil. Imperial then hired Frasch to assist them in retrofitting their Silver Star refinery with his refining process. Imperial offered Frasch a fee of $10,000, but he persuaded the company to provide him with a salary that matched the president of Imperial Oil, Frederick A. Fitzgerald. Once Frasch's completed his work on the refinery in February 1885, he resigned and joined Imperial board member John Minhinnick in founding the Empire Oil Company. The partners purchased a refinery in London, and Frasch began experimenting on a way to remove the sulfur in kerosene refined from Petrolia oil. The oil fields in Lambton County, Ontario, Canada had a high sulfur content, resulting in the kerosene producing excessive smoke and a pungent smell when burned. Canadians nicknamed the kerosene "skunk oil," and refiners had a difficult time marketing their products at home and abroad. Working from 1885 to 1887, Frasch determined that mixing copper oxide during the distillation process removed the sulfur content from the oil.

Around the same time as Frasch's discovery, Standard Oil began expanding into Lima, Ohio, and discovered that its oil, like Lambton County's, had a high sulfur content. Recognizing that any improvement in the Canadian oil could also be applied to the Ohio oil, Standard hired Frasch in July 1886, offering him "a salary higher than that of any other scientist in the country," and an exchange of his shares in the Empire Oil Company for Standard Oil shares. Once Frasch returned to the United States, he began working for the Solar Refining Company, a Standard Oil subsidiary in Lima, Ohio, and perfected his desulfurization method. Standard Oil held a patent monopoly on the desulfurization method until 1905, making its investments into the Lima oilfields extremely profitable for the company. Frasch became independently wealthy when he sold half his Standard stock after the price rose from $168 to $820 per share, while the dividend on the stock he retained increased from 7 to 40 percent.

=== Sulfur career ===
During the search for oil in Louisiana, near the present-day city of Sulphur, sulfur was found below a layer of quicksand. All attempts to get to the sulfur with conventional mining shafts ended in disaster. Herman Frasch drilled three dry holes nearby, but the sulfur was not on his property. Frasch concluded the sulfur was associated with a dome structure located on an island owned by the American Sulphur Company. On 20 Oct. 1890, he took out three patents for his Frasch Process. Frasch, and his business associates Frank Rockefeller and F.B. Squire, then entered into a 50-50 agreement with American Sulphur Company to form a new corporation called Union Sulphur Company.

In 1894, Frasch started drilling well No. 14 using a 10-inch pipe, finally getting through the quicksand to the caprock after three months. He then drilled an 8-inch bore to the bottom of the sulfur deposit. A strainer, consisting of perforated 6 inch casing, was placed at the bottom of the 623 feet long test tube. Above the strainer were larger holes acting as the hot water outlet. A 3-inch pipe inside the 6 inch casing descended to the strainer, and was connected to a sucker rod pump. Water, from the surrounding swamp, was heated in a 20 feet high cylinder 30 inches in diameter, from steam supplied by 4 boilers. The superheated water was poured into the well for 24 hours, and on Christmas Day, melted sulfur was pumped to the surface filling 40 barrels in 15 minutes. The excess was then directed to a levee, where it solidified. As Frasch himself said about the first demonstration of the first Frasch Process, "We had melted the mineral in the ground and brought it to the surface as liquid."

Frasch then eliminated the pump, by using air lift via compressed air. Bubbles form from the air, making the sulfur less dense than the surrounding water, thus raising the aerated column. Costs were also reduced by replacing wood and coal with oil. Then in 1911, he introduced bleed pumps to draw off excess cold water.

In 1908, Frasch entered into an agreement with the Italian Government dividing the world market outside the U.S., where Union Sulphur Company was guaranteed one-third. His costs were one-fifth that of Sicilian sulfur mined in Caltanissetta. That agreement ended in 1912.

Frasch was awarded 64 U.S. patents during his lifetime. Once his original patents expired, Frasch was unsuccessful in blocking Freeport Sulphur Company from using his process.

== Personal life ==
Frasch married Romalda Berkin (1854–1889) in 1869. There is no record of her death. They had 2 children. George Berkin Frasch was born in Philadelphia in 1873. Frieda Frasch (1871-1951) was born in Cleveland. Frieda went on to marry Henry Devereux Whiton, who went on to succeed his father-in-law as president of Union Sulphur Co.

Frasch married his second wife Elizabeth Blee (1858–1924) on June 16, 1890, shortly after his first wife died.

Herman Frasch died at his home in Paris on May 1, 1914, and was buried in Gaildorf. His body and that of his widow were brought to the United States and re-interred in the Sleepy Hollow Cemetery, Sleepy Hollow, New York, following the death of Elizabeth in Paris in 1924 .

== Honors ==
Frasch was awarded the Perkin Medal in 1912.

The Union Sulphur Company honored him by naming three of their ships Herman Frasch, in 1910, 1920 and 1947.

Frasch Elementary school, a public school in Calcasieu Parish, and Frasch Hall, a building at McNeese State University, were named after him. Frasch's surname is often misspelled Frash.

== See also ==
- Sulfur mining in Sicily

== Additional reading ==
- "Obituaries - Herman Frasch, Paul L. V. Héroult". Industrial & Engineering Chemistry. 6 (6): 505–507. 1914. doi:10.1021/ie50066a024.
- Herman Frasch (1912). "The Perkin's Medal Award - Address of Acceptance". Industrial & Engineering Chemistry. 4 (2): 134–140. doi:10.1021/ie50038a016.
- Herman Frasch (1918). "Unveiling of the Portrait of Herman Frasch". Industrial & Engineering Chemistry. 10 (4): 326–327. doi:10.1021/ie50100a038.
- History of Sulphur (Sulphur, Louisiana)
- Stuart Bruchey (1960). "Brimstone, The Stone That Burns: The Story of the Frasch Sulphur Industry by Williams Haynes". Journal of Economic History. 20 (2): 326–327. JSTOR 2114864.
- Walter Botsch (2001). "Chemiker, Techniker, Unternehmer: Zum 150. Geburtstag von Hermann Frasch". Chemie in unserer Zeit. 35 (5): 324–331. doi:10.1002/1521-3781(200110)35:5<324::AID-CIUZ324>3.0.CO;2-9.
- Oskison, John M. (July 1914). "A Chemist Who Became King Of An Industry: Herman Frasch, The Greatest Of Oil-Refining Experts and Master, Through His Researches And Inventions, Of The Sulphur Supply Of The World". The World's Work: A History of Our Time. XXVIII (2). Doubleday, Page & Co.: 310.

Attribution

- This article incorporates text from a publication now in the public domain: Homans, James E., ed. (1918). "Frasch, Herman" . The Cyclopædia of American Biography. New York: The Press Association Compilers, Inc.
- This article incorporates text from a publication now in the public domain: Rines, George Edwin, ed. (1920). "Frasch, Herman" . Encyclopedia Americana.
