= SS Russell A. Alger =

World War II Liberty ship of the United States

History

United States
- Name: Russell A. Alger
- Namesake: Russell A. Alger
- Builder: Oregon Shipbuilding Corporation, Portland, Oregon
- Yard number: 680
- Acquired: 3 March 1943 (delivered WSA)
- In service: 3 March 1943
- Out of service: 9 June 1952 (final layup)
- Fate: Sold for scrap 9 May 1973
- Notes: Official number: 242952; Signal: KFKG

General characteristics
- Type: Liberty ship
- Tonnage: 7,176 GRT, 10,844 DWT
- Length: 441 ft 6 in (134.57 m)
- Beam: 56 ft 11 in (17.35 m)
- Draft: 27 ft 9 in (8.46 m)
- Propulsion: Two oil-fired boilers; Triple-expansion steam engine; Single screw; 2,500 hp (1,864 kW)
- Speed: 11 knots (20 km/h; 13 mph)
- Capacity: 9,140 tons cargo
- Complement: 41
- Armament: 1 × Stern-mounted 4 in (100 mm) deck gun; AA guns

SS Russell A. Alger, (MC hull 1754), was a Liberty ship named after Russell A. Alger, a Michigan senator, governor and U.S. secretary of war.

The ship was a standard type EC2-S-C1 cargo ship ordered from the Oregon Shipbuilding Corporation, Portland, Oregon under contract number MA-6955 of 7,176 GRT, 10,844 DWT given the official number 242952, signal KFKG, and delivered to the War Shipping Administration (WSA) on 3 March 1943. (Note: The reference given in previous versions, ShipbuildingHistory, Oregon Shipbuilding, Portland OR, contains a rare error.) Russell A. Alger was placed under a standard WSA operating agreement with Union Sulphur Company at Portland, Oregon upon delivery. That operating agreement continued through the war until the ship was placed in the Reserve Fleet, Mobile on 18 October 1946.

On 19 February 1947 the ship was taken out of reserve pending bareboat charter to South Atlantic Steamship Line which took effect 14 June 1947 at New Orleans and was then converted to an agreement with the Maritime Commission (Note: WSA ceased to exist as operator after the war with ownership and operation reverting to the MC.) 9 September 1949 in preparation for layup 20 September 1949 at Beaumont, Texas. The ship was brought out of reserve a final time on for operation under an MC agreement by Pacific Far East Lines on 15 August 1951 before entering the reserve at Beaumont a final time on 9 June 1952. The ship was sold for $96,666 to Consolidated Steel for scrap on 9 May 1973 and physically withdrawn from the fleet on 16 May.
