= Frasch process =

Industrial method of sulfur extraction

Frasch process of Sulfur extraction
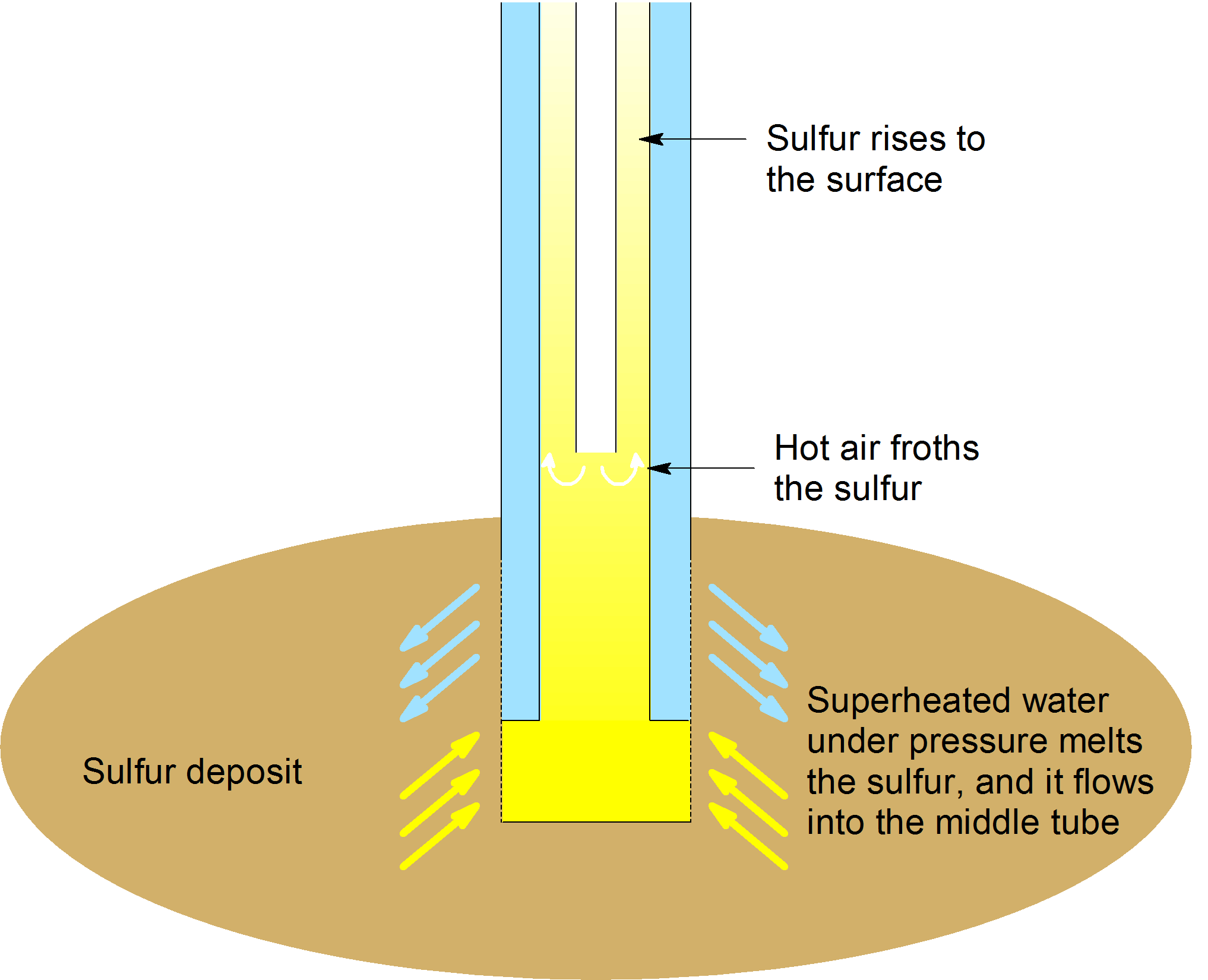
- b
- Process type: Superheated water
- Industrial sector(s): Mining
- Product(s): Sulfur
- Inventor: Herman Frasch
- Year of invention: 1894

The Frasch process is a method to extract sulfur from underground deposits by taking advantage of the low melting point of sulfur. It is the only industrial method of recovering sulfur from elemental deposits. Most of the world's sulfur was obtained this way until the late 20th century, when sulfur recovered from petroleum and gas sources became more commonplace (see Claus process).

In the Frasch process, superheated water is pumped into the sulfur deposit; the sulfur melts and is extracted. The Frasch process is able to produce high-purity sulfur of about 99.5%.

== History ==
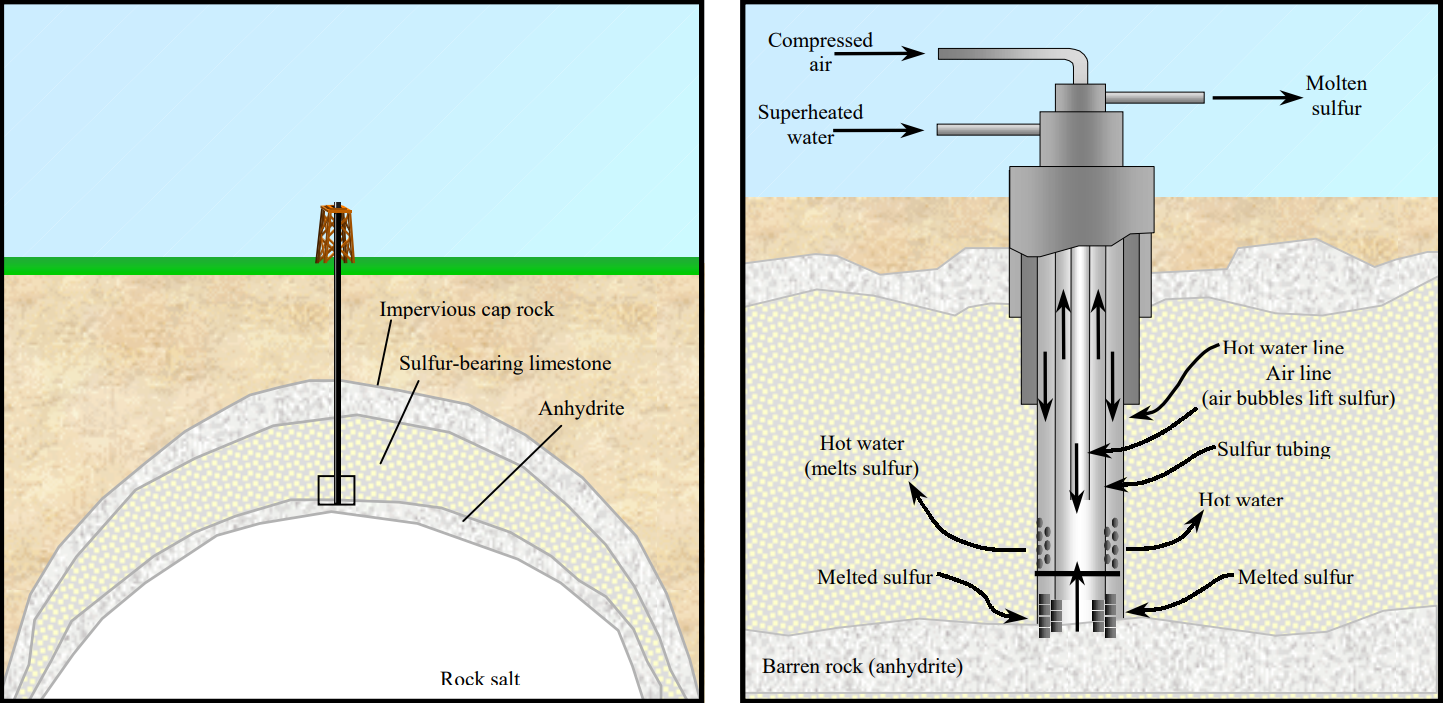
Illustration that shows the structure of a sulfur-containing salt dome and the details of the Frasch pump used to extract the sulfur from underground formations. Superheated water is pumped into the formation to melt the sulfur. The molten sulfur is lifted to the surface with compressed air.

In 1867, miners discovered sulfur in the caprock of a salt dome in Calcasieu Parish, Louisiana, but it was beneath quicksand, which prevented mining. In 1894 the German-born American chemist, Herman Frasch (1852–1914), devised his Frasch method of sulfur removal using pipes to bypass the quicksand. This replaced the inefficient and polluting Sicilian method. The process proved successful, on December 24, 1894, when the first molten sulfur was brought to the surface. The Union Sulphur Company was incorporated in 1896 to utilize the process. However, the high cost of fuel needed to heat the water made the process uneconomic until the 1901 discovery of the Spindletop oil field in Texas provided cheap fuel oil to the region. The Frasch process began economic production at Sulphur Mines, Louisiana in 1903.

When Frasch's patent expired, the process was widely applied to similar salt-dome sulfur deposits along the Gulf Coast of the United States. The second Frasch-process mine opened in 1912 in Brazoria County, Texas. The Gulf Coast came to dominate world sulfur production in the early and middle 20th century. However, starting in the 1970s, byproduct sulfur recovery from oil and natural gas lowered the price of sulfur and drove many Frasch-process mines out of business. The last United States Frasch sulfur mine closed in 2000. A Frasch mine in Iraq closed in 2003 due to the U.S. invasion of Iraq.

The Frasch process is still used to work sulfur deposits in Mexico, Ukraine and Poland.

== Process ==
The Frasch sulfur process works best on either salt domes or bedded evaporite deposits, where sulfur is found in permeable rock layers trapped in between impermeable layers. Bacterial alteration of anhydrite or gypsum, in the presence of hydrocarbons, produces limestone and hydrogen sulfide in the sulfur cycle. The hydrogen sulfide then oxidizes into sulfur, from percolating water, or through the action of anaerobic, sulfur-reducing bacteria

In the Frasch process, three concentric tubes are introduced into the sulfur deposit. Superheated water (165 °C, 2.5-3 MPa) is injected into the deposit via the outermost tube. Sulfur (m.p. 115 °C) melts and flows into the middle tube. Water pressure alone is unable to force the sulfur into the surface due to the molten sulfur's greater density, so hot air is introduced via the innermost tube to froth the sulfur, making it less dense, and pushing it to the surface.

The sulfur obtained can be very pure (99.7 - 99.8%). In this form, it is light yellow in color. If contaminated by organic compounds, it can be dark-colored; further purification is not economic, and usually unnecessary. Using this method, the United States produced 3.89 million tons of sulfur in 1989, and Mexico produced 1.02 million tons of sulfur in 1991.

The Frasch process can be used for deposits 50–800 meters deep. 3-38 cubic meters of superheated water are required to produce every tonne of sulfur, and the associated energy cost is significant. A working demonstration model of the Frasch process suitable for the classroom has been described.

== Economic impact ==
World Production of Sulphur (1900-1929) (long tons)
Year	United States	Italy	Japan	Chile	Spain	Total (Note: Not including other scattered production throughout the world)
1900	3,147	535,525	14,211	1,661	738	555,282
1901	6,867	554,203	16,287	2,037	600	597,994
1902	7,446	530,913	17,996	2,594	443	559,394
1903	35,097	545,005	22,513	3,504	1,653	607,772
1904	85,000	519,231	25,165	3,538	595	633,529
1905	220,000	559,942	24,264	3,417	600	808,223
1906	295,123	491,920	27,885	4,525	689	820,142
1907	188,878	420,229	32,803	2,859	3,555	648,324
1908	364,444	438,279	32,891	2,662	2,941	841,217
1909	273,983	428,189	36,317	4,437	3,375	746,301
1910	247,060	423,563	43,154	3,762	3,773	721,312
1911	205,066	407,620	49,481	4,380	6,476	673,023
1912	787,735	383,300	53,692	4,361	4,519	1,233,607
1913	491,080	380,209	58,509	6,542	7,381	943,721
1914	417,690	371,875	72,944	9,850	7,933	880,292
1915	520,582	352,451	71,066	9,615	9,517	963,231
1916	649,683	265,120	104,707	14,644	10,461	1,044,515
1917	1,134,412	208,501	116,224	17,787	12,681	1,489,605
1918	1,353,525	230,596	63,748	19,248	12,537	1,679,654
1919	1,190,575	222,555	49,831	18,611	11,263	1,492,835
1920	1,255,249	259,440	38,975	13,129	12,200	1,578,993
1921	1,879,150	269,547	36,013	9,517	5,170	2,199,397
1922	1,830,942	154,696	34,095	12,057	13,028	2,054,818
1923	2,036,097	252,293	36,825	11,200	8,382	2,344,797
1924	1,220,561	290,241	46,133	9,611	9,388	1,575,934
1925	1,409,262	259,428	46,962	8,929	7,859	1,732,440
1926	1,890,027	267,107	47,020	8,787	9,351	2,222,292
1927	2,111,618	300,888	60,371	12,303	10,065	2,495,245
1928	1,981,873	291,430	68,956	15,423	10,199	2,367,881
1929	2,362,389	323,000 (Note: estimate)	58,718	16,000	10,000	2,770,107

== List of Mines ==
Frasch Sulphur mines in the United States (1895-1966)
Dome	State	Company	From	Until	Total long tons	Dry land marsh/swamp/lake offshore
Sulphur Mine	La	Union	Dec 27, 1894	Dec 23, 1924	9,412,165	
Bryan Mound	Tx	Freeport	Nov 12, 1912	Sep 30, 1935	5,001,068	28.918°N 95.377°W
Big Hill	Tx	Texas Gulf	Mar 19, 1919	Aug 10, 1936	12,349,597	
Hoskins Mound	Tx	Freeport	Mar 31, 1923	May 26, 1955	10,895,090	29.136°N 95.231°W
Big Creek	Tx	Union	Mar 6, 1925	Feb 24, 1926	1,450	
Palangana	Tx	Duval	Oct 27, 1928	Mar 10, 1935	236,662	
Boling	Tx	Union	Nov 14, 1928	Aug 30, 1929	9,164	
Boling	Tx	Texas Gulf	Mar 19, 1929		>61,118,065	
Long Point	Tx	Texas Gulf	Mar 19, 1930	Oct 19, 1938	402,105	
Lake Peigneur	La	Jefferson Lake	Oct 20, 1932	Jun 7, 1936	430,811	29°59′19″N 91°58′59″W
Grand Ecaille	La	Freeport	Dec 8, 1933		>30,885,243	29.38°N 89.78°W
Boling	Tx	Duval	Mar 23, 1935	Apr 25, 1940	571,123	
Boling	Tx	Baker-Williams	Jun 2, 1935	Dec 18, 1935	1,435	
Clemens	Tx	Jefferson Lake	May 3, 1937	Dec 14, 1960	2,975,828	
Orchard	Tx	Duval	1938			
Orchard	Tx	Jefferson Lake	Jun 7, 1946		>4,551,472	
Moss Bluff	Tx	Texas Gulf	Jun 24, 1948		>5,081,343	
Starks Dome	La	Jefferson Lake	Jun 15, 1951	Dec 13, 1960	840,249	
Spindletop Mine	Tx	Texas Lake	May 12, 1952		>6,310,721	
Bay Ste. Elaine	La	Freeport	Nov 19, 1952	Dec 29, 1959	1,131,204	29°10′47″N 90°39′35″W
Damon	Tx	Standard Sulphur	Nov 11, 1953	Apr 20, 1957	139,618	
Garden Island Bay	La	Freeport	Nov 19, 1953	1991	>7,006,991	29.093°N 89.193°W
Nash	Tx	Freeport	Feb 3, 1954	Nov 23, 1956	153,115	29.308°N 95.655°W
Chacahoula	La	Freeport	Feb 25, 1955	Sep 28, 1962	1,199,015	29°45′0″N 90°55′48″W
Fannett	Tx	Texas Gulf	May 6, 1958		>1,773,737	
High Island	Tx	United States	Mar 25, 1960	Feb 8, 1962	36,708	
Grand Isle	La	Freeport	Apr 17, 1960	1991	>4,466,021	29.193°N 89.892°W
Lake Pelto	La	Freeport	Nov 26, 1960		>2,474,693	29.1°N 90.677°W
Big Hill	Tx	Texas Gulf	Oct 8, 1965		>107,830	
Sulphur Mine	La	Allied Chemical	Sep 18, 1966		>1,447	
Nash	Tx	Phelan Sulphur	Nov 7, 1966		>622	

=== Mexico ===
In 1955 Mexico became the world's second largest producer of sulfur behind the United States.

Native Sulfur production in Mexico (long tons)
	1948-1952 (avg)	1953	1954	1955	1956	1957
Total	8,452	5,900	52,407	475,487	758,415	1,007,915
Frasch						990,122
