= Carroll A. Deering =

Five-masted commercial schooner and ghost ship

Coordinates: 35.262440°N 75.491695°W

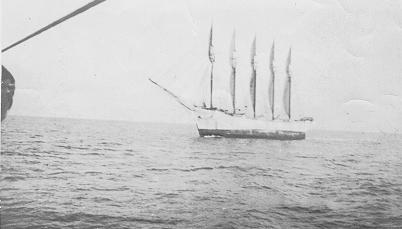
- Schooner Carroll A. Deering, as seen from the Cape Lookout lightship on January 28, 1921

History

United States
- Name: Carroll A. Deering
- Namesake: Carroll Atwood Deering (1882–1967)
- Operator: G.G. Deering Company
- Builder: G.G. Deering Company Yards, Bath, Maine
- Laid down: 1918
- Launched: April 4, 1919
- Completed: 1919
- Out of service: January 31, 1921
- Home port: Bath, Maine, United States
- Fate: Wrecked 1921

General characteristics
- Tonnage: 1,879 tons
- Tons burthen: 3500 tons
- Length: 255 ft (78 m)
- Beam: 44 ft (13 m)
- Sail plan: Five-masted schooner
- Boats & landing craft carried: 2
- Complement: 11

Carroll A. Deering was an American five-masted commercial schooner launched in 1919 and found run aground without its crew off Cape Hatteras, North Carolina, in January 1921.

== Overview ==
The Carroll A. Deering was built in Bath, Maine, in 1919 by the G.G. Deering Company for commercial use. The owner of the company named the ship after his son. One of the last large commercial sailing vessels, the ship was designed to carry cargo and had been in service for a year when it began its final voyage to Rio de Janeiro, Brazil.

== Carroll A. Deering's last voyage ==
On July 19, 1920, the Carroll A. Deering sailed from Puerto Rico, and arrived at Newport News to pick up a cargo of coal for delivery to Rio de Janeiro. The ship was captained by William H. Merritt, a hero of World War I who had been cited for bravery under fire for saving his entire crew when his previous command, the Deering-built five-masted schooner Dorothy B. Barrett, was sunk by the German submarine U-117 off Cape May, New Jersey in 1918. Merritt's son, Sewall, was his first mate and had a ten-man crew made up entirely of Scandinavians (mostly Danes). On August 26, 1920, the Carroll A. Deering cleared the Virginia Capes bound for Brazil, but Captain Merritt soon fell seriously ill and the schooner turned back and put into the port of Lewes, Delaware to drop off Merritt and his son. The Deering Company recruited Captain Willis B. Wormell, a retired 66-year-old veteran sea captain, to replace him on the voyage to Brazil. Charles B. McLellan was hired on as first mate.

The Carroll A. Deering, with Wormell in command, set sail for Rio de Janeiro on September 8, 1920, arriving there and delivering its cargo without incident. Wormell gave his crew leave and met with a Captain Goodwin, an old friend who captained another cargo vessel that was docked in the port. Wormell spoke of his crew with disdain, though he claimed to trust the engineer, Herbert Bates, with whom Goodwin was also acquainted. The Carroll A. Deering left Rio de Janeiro on December 2, 1920, and stopped for supplies at Barbados. First Mate McLellan got drunk in town and complained to Captain Hugh Norton of Snow that he could not discipline the crew without Wormell interfering, and that he had to do all the navigation owing to Wormell's poor eyesight. Later, Captain Norton, his first mate, and another captain were in the Continental Café and heard McLellan say, "I'll get the captain before we get to Norfolk, I will." McLellan was arrested in a drunken state, but on January 9 Wormell forgave him, bailed him out of jail, and set sail for Hampton Roads.

The ship was next sighted by the Cape Lookout lightship off North Carolina on January 28, 1921, when the Carroll A. Deering hailed it. The lightship's keeper, Captain Jacobson, reported that a tall thin man with reddish hair and a foreign accent speaking through a megaphone told him the vessel had lost its anchors in a storm off Cape Fear and asked that the ship's owners, the G.G. Deering Company, be notified. Jacobson took note of this, but his radio was out, so he was unable to report it. He also noticed that the crew seemed to be "milling around" on the quarterdeck of the ship, an area where they were usually not allowed. The following afternoon, the crew of another vessel transiting the area spotted the schooner sailing a course that would take it directly onto the Diamond Shoals. They, however, saw no one on the ship's decks and did not attempt to hail the vessel, assuming her crew would spot the Cape Hatteras Lighthouse or the Diamond Shoals Lightship and change course to avoid wrecking on the shoals.

== The wreck ==
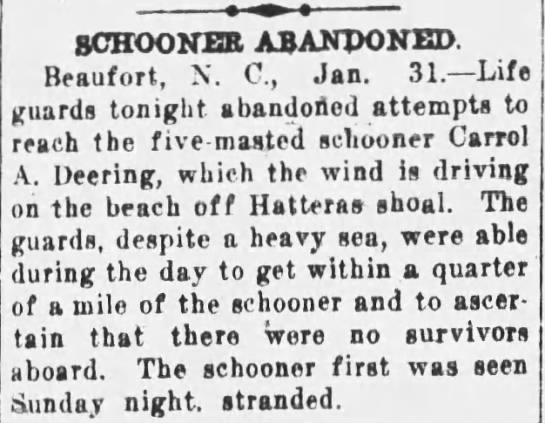
Article in the Arkansas Gazette of February 1, 1921

On January 31, 1921, the Carroll A. Deering was sighted at dawn by surfman C. P. Brady who was on lookout duty at the United States Coast Guard station at Cape Hatteras. The vessel was hard aground with all sails set on the outer edge of Diamond Shoals. The shoals that extend offshore from Cape Hatteras, North Carolina were notorious as a common site of shipwrecks for centuries and are known as the "Graveyard of the Atlantic." Rescue ships were unable to approach the vessel owing to bad weather. The ship was not boarded until February 4, after being battered by the surf for several days, and it became clear that the schooner had been completely abandoned. Her steering equipment was found to be damaged, with the wheel shattered, the binnacle box stove in, and the rudder disengaged from its stock. The ship's log and navigation equipment were gone, along with the crew's personal effects and the ship's two lifeboats. In the vessel's galley it appeared that certain foodstuffs were being prepared for the next day's meal at the time of the abandonment. The Coast Guard cutter USCGC Manning attempted to salvage Carroll A. Deering, but found this impossible. The vessel was declared a hazard to navigation, and was destroyed using dynamite on March 4 to prevent it from becoming a danger to other vessels.

A portion of the ship's bow later drifted ashore on Ocracoke Island. Wooden timbers from the wreck also washed ashore on Hatteras Island, and were used by local residents to build houses.

=== Forged message in a bottle ===
On April 11, 1921, a local fisherman claimed to have found a message in a bottle floating in the waters off the beach of Buxton, North Carolina; he swiftly turned it over to the authorities. The text of the message was as follows:

DEERING CAPTURED BY OIL BURNING BOAT SOMETHING LIKE CHASER. TAKING OFF EVERYTHING HANDCUFFING CREW. CREW HIDING ALL OVER SHIP NO CHANCE TO MAKE ESCAPE. FINDER PLEASE NOTIFY HEADQUARTERS DEERING.

The handwriting in the letter was identified as that of the ship's engineer, Henry Bates, by the widow of Captain Wormell, and the bottle was proven to have been manufactured in Brazil. This, along with a sighting of a "mysterious" steamer that arrived at the Cape Lookout lightship in the wake of Carroll A. Deering, suggested hostile action. The captain of the lightship had attempted to hail the steamer to get its crew to relay the message from the Carroll A. Deering but the steamer failed to respond and he could not make out the ship's name, as the crew had unfurled a canvas to cover the nameplate.

The message also raised skepticism: if a crew member did manage to get hold of paper, pen, and bottle and write a letter, why would he request that the company be notified, as opposed to the police or Coast Guard? Handwriting experts concluded later that the message was forged, and, after further questioning by federal agents, the fisherman admitted to the forgery. Gray apparently forged the note in hopes that the publicity he would garner from finding it would help him secure employment at the Cape Hatteras light station.

== Investigation ==
The U.S. government launched an extensive investigation into the disappearance of the crew of the Carroll A. Deering. Five departments of the government — Commerce, Treasury, Justice, Navy, and State — looked into the case. Herbert Hoover, then Secretary of Commerce, was intrigued by the fact that several other vessels of various nationalities — most notably the sulfur freighter Hewitt — had also disappeared in roughly the same area. Although most of these vessels were later revealed to have been sailing in the vicinity of a series of particularly powerful hurricanes, the Hewitt and Carroll A. Deering were proven to have been sailing away from the area of the storm at the time. Hoover's assistant, Lawrence Ritchey, was placed in charge of the investigation. Ritchey tried to chart what happened to the vessel between its last sighting at Cape Lookout and its running aground at Diamond Shoals by reading the log books of the Coast Guard lightships stationed in those areas.

When an Italian inquiry into the disappearance of the vessel Monte San Michele confirmed that there had been strong hurricanes in the vicinity, mutiny was then accepted as the explanation for the Carroll A. Deering incident. The investigation was closed in late 1922 without an official finding on the incident.

=== Theories ===
The following theories were considered by the U.S. government in its investigation:

- Hurricanes: The U.S. government, particularly the National Weather Bureau, strongly advocated a series of powerful hurricanes known to have been raging in the Atlantic as the cause of the disappearances. As mentioned above, however, both the Deering and the Hewitt were heading away from the path of these storms. In any case, several authors, including Larry Kusche and Richard Winer, have pointed out that the state of the ship indicates an orderly rather than panicked evacuation.
- Piracy: Captain O. W. Parker of the United States Marine Shipping Board certainly believed piracy responsible; he stated that, in his opinion, "Piracy without a doubt still exists as it has since the days of the Phoenicians". Captain Wormell's widow was a particularly strong advocate of this theory. It was believed that a group of pirates were responsible for the various disappearances; however, no real evidence of this theory emerged, and no suspected pirates were ever caught.
- Russian/Communist piracy: During a police raid on the headquarters of the United Russian Workers Party (a Communist organization) in New York City, officers allegedly found papers that called on members of the organization to seize American ships and sail them to the Soviet Union. This was widely believed to be relevant to the Carroll A. Deering incident at the time, particularly by hardline anti-communists in the government. However, no evidence has surfaced that any of these allegedly planned activities were actually carried out.
- Rum runners: A similar speculation to the above speculates that a group of liquor smugglers working out of the Bahamas stole the ship to use as a rum-running vessel (this was during the Prohibition era). The Carroll A. Deering was large enough, according to Richard Winer's Ghost Ships, to carry roughly a million dollars' worth of liquor in her hold. On the other hand, it is doubtful that such a conspicuous, easily identifiable and comparatively slow vessel would constitute a choice target for smugglers. No evidence supporting this speculation has ever emerged.
- Mutiny: Wormell's known conflict with his first mate and derisive comments towards his crew while in Rio de Janeiro suggested that something may have been amiss between the captain and his men on the voyage. Captain Jacobson at Cape Lookout certainly thought it odd; the man who hailed his vessel was definitely not Captain Wormell, and he was not an officer by all accounts. Senator Frederick Hale of Maine advocated this theory, stating it was "a plain case of mutiny". Discontent with the captain could certainly have caused a mutiny of the crew, but once again, nothing definitive has ever been proven.

== Aftermath ==
No official explanation for the disappearance of the crew of the Carroll A. Deering was ever offered. In September 1955, the remaining hull of the Carroll A. Deering was moved about 9 miles (14 km) by Hurricane Ione, from Ocracoke Island to Hatteras.

Carroll A. Deering, for whom the ship was named, died in March 1967, aged 84.

As of April 2016, the ship's bell and capstan from the Carroll A. Deering were on display at the Graveyard of the Atlantic Museum in Hatteras.

== See also ==
- List of people who disappeared mysteriously at sea
