= A Man to Remember =

1938 film by Garson Kanin

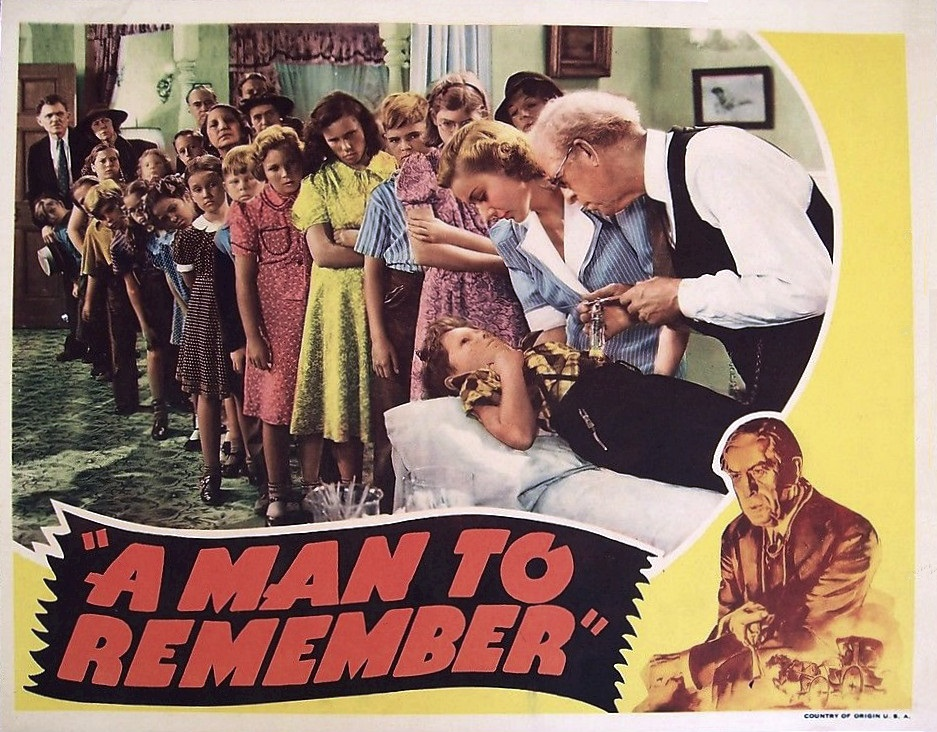
- Theatrical release lobby card
- Directed by: Garson Kanin
- Screenplay by: Dalton Trumbo
- Based on: Failure; 1932 short story by Katherine Haviland Taylor
- Produced by: Robert Sisk
- Starring: Anne Shirley; Edward Ellis; Lee Bowman
- Cinematography: J. Roy Hunt
- Edited by: Jack Hively
- Music by: Roy Webb
- Distributed by: RKO Radio Pictures
- Release date: October 14, 1938 (United States)
- Running time: 80 minutes
- Country: United States
- Language: English
- Budget: $118,000
- Box office: $416,000

A Man to Remember is a 1938 American drama film directed by Garson Kanin, his first film credit as a director. The picture was based on the short story Failure, written by Katharine Haviland-Taylor, and the screenplay was penned by Dalton Trumbo. The story tells of a saintly small-town doctor working under difficult circumstances somewhere in the United States after World War I. The movie is a remake of One Man's Journey (1933) starring Lionel Barrymore.

== Plot ==
Under the grieving eyes of most of a town, the funeral procession of Doctor John Abbott passes a lawyer's office. The lawyer opens Abbott's strongbox for the deceased man's impatient creditors, local banker George Sykes, newspaper editor Jode Harkness and store owner Homer Ramsey. Flashbacks begin as they peruse Dr. Abbott's papers.

Widowed, Dr. Abbott arrives in Westport with his son Dick after World War I. He borrows money in order to set up his medical practice. He delivers a healthy baby, Jean, but the mother dies. When her father does not want her, the doctor adopts the child.

Later, Ramsey tries to collect what he is owed from Abbott, only to find that Abbott has a hefty $100 bill for him for a life-saving operation. When Ramsey complains about the amount, the good-natured doctor settles for a mere $2.

As time goes on, Dr. Abbott seeks to convince the town leaders of the need for a hospital. Sykes, Harkness, and Ramsey refuse to consider it. However, when Sykes's son Howard accidentally shoots Jean in the arm, the doctor informs Sykes that he is required by law to report all gunshot wounds. Sykes is blackmailed into building the hospital and donating it to the town to avoid the legal problems. However, Dr. Abbott finds that Sykes has spitefully stipulated that only doctors who have had graduate studies within the last twenty years can register, and he is turned away.

Meanwhile, Dick goes to Paris to train to become a doctor. When he graduates and returns to Westport, he tells his father that he is going into partnership with Dr. Robinson because he is more interested in making money than in helping people. This hurts the father deeply, but he never shares this with his son.

When Abbott fears that an outbreak of infantile paralysis (polio) among the children is imminent, he tries to get an upcoming county fair canceled. However, Sykes and Ramsey refuse his request. They phone Jode Harkness to get him to refuse to publish Abbott's urgent warning. Undaunted, the doctor has handbills printed and distributed by some young boys. He and Jean then visit all the children in Westport. This is brought to the attention of the county medical association, which votes to suspend him. Dick defends his father and resigns in protest. Then, Abbott is proved right. An epidemic erupts everywhere...except Westport. The association reverses itself and elects him its president.

Abbott is finally recognized for his humanitarian work by the community. His son sees the light and agrees to join Abbott's small medical practice. However, after Dick and Jean leave, he dies peacefully in his sleep. Returning to the present, Harkness, Sykes, and Ramsey finally acknowledge the goodness of the man who had been a thorn in their sides for so long.

== Cast ==
- Anne Shirley as Jean
- Edward Ellis as John Abbott
- Lee Bowman as Dick Abbott
- William Henry as Howard Sykes
- Granville Bates as George Sykes
- Harlan Briggs as Homer Ramsey
- Frank M. Thomas as Jode Harkness
- Charles Halton as Perkins
- John Wray as Johnson
- Gilbert Emery as Dr. Robinson
- Dickie Jones as Dick Abbott, as a child
- Carole Leete as Jean, as a child
- Joe DeStefani as Jorgensen

== Production ==
The film was based on a story called Failure which had been bought by RKO. Garson Kanin had been assigned to direct a Western but Dalton Trumbo told him about Failure. Kanin read it and became enthusiastic and asked Robert Sisk if he could do that story instead. The studio agreed, although Kanin had to use a mostly unknown cast and a budget of only $119,000.

== Preservation status ==
In April 2007, Turner Classic Movies (TCM) premiered six films produced by Merian C. Cooper at RKO which had been out of distribution for more than 50 years. (A retired RKO executive stated in an interview used as a promo on TCM for the premiere that Cooper did allow the films to be shown in 1955–1956 in a limited re-release and only in New York City.)

According to TCM host Robert Osborne, Cooper agreed to a legal settlement in 1946, after accusing RKO of not giving him all the money due him from his producer's contract in the 1930s. The settlement gave Cooper complete ownership of six titles:

- Rafter Romance (1933)
- Double Harness (1933)
- The Right to Romance (1933)
- One Man's Journey (1933)
- Living on Love (1937)
- A Man to Remember

When Turner Broadcasting bought the RKO film library in 1987, the six films were not included and the rights had to be purchased separately.

The original copies of the film's negative were destroyed due to negligence. The only known surviving copy is a 35mm, original nitrate print with Dutch subtitles, which was restored by TCM.

In 2000, it was preserved by the Netherlands Film Museum.

== Critical reception ==
The film was well received. In fact, it was named by The New York Times as one of the ten best films of 1938. Times film critic Frank S. Nugent wrote, "Our admiration for A Man to Remember is so ungrudgingly complete...a picture of this one's competence so looms out of all proportion to its physical size."

The film made a profit of $146,000.

== Radio adaptations ==
A Man to Remember was presented in a one-hour radio adaptation on Lux Radio Theatre on December 4, 1939, starring Bob Burns and Anita Louise, and on May 18, 1942, starring Anita Louise and Lionel Barrymore. It was also presented as a half-hour play on Philip Morris Playhouse on September 26, 1941.
