= Living on Love =

1937 film by Lew Landers

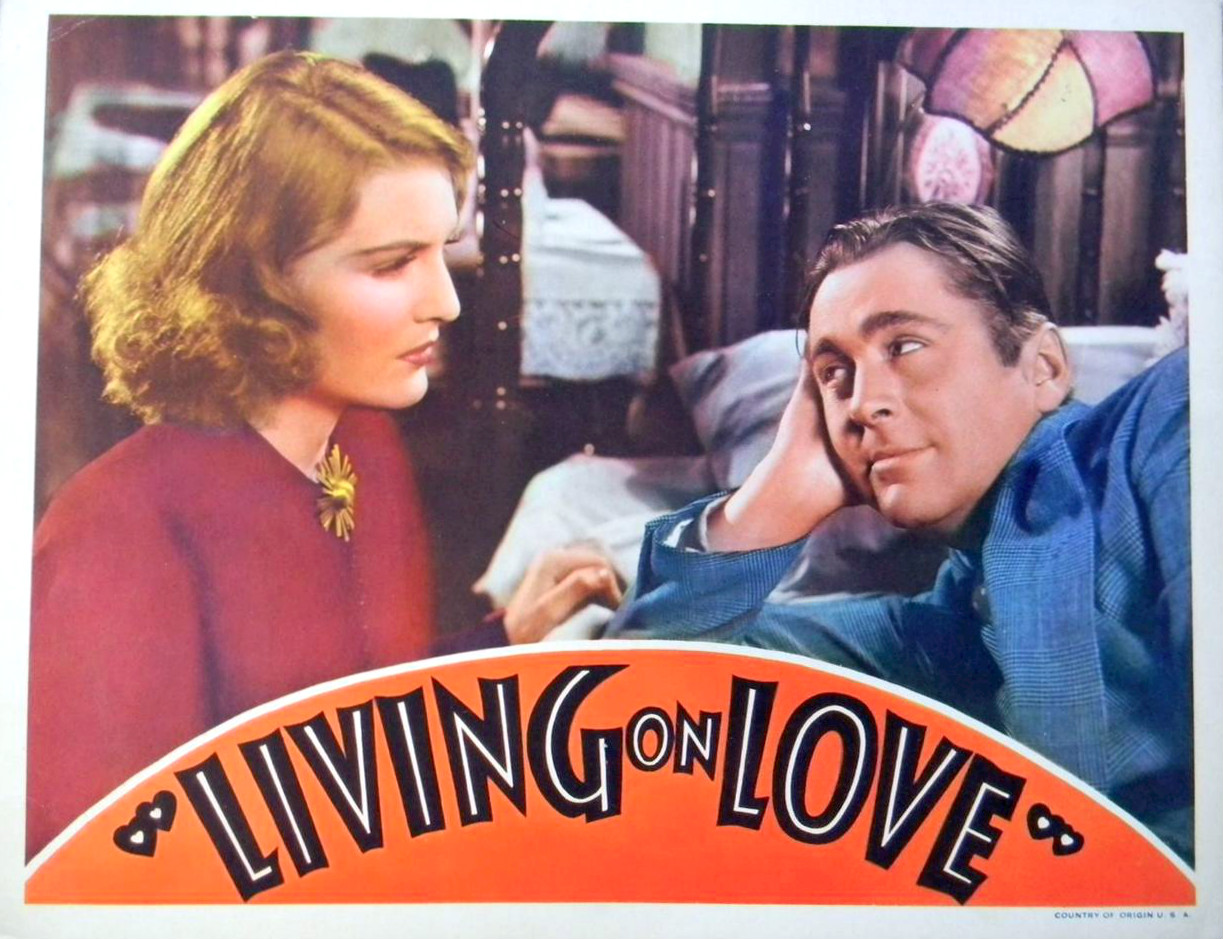
- Lobby card
- Directed by: Lew Landers
- Screenplay by: Franklin Coen
- Based on: Rafter Romance; 1932 novel by John Wells
- Produced by: Maury M. Cohen
- Starring: James Dunn; Whitney Bourne; Joan Woodbury
- Cinematography: Nicholas Musuraca
- Edited by: Harry Marker
- Production company: RKO Radio Pictures
- Distributed by: RKO Radio Pictures
- Release date: November 12, 1937
- Running time: 61 minutes
- Country: United States
- Language: English
- Budget: $112,000
- Box office: $135,000

Living on Love is a 1937 American romantic comedy film released by RKO Radio Pictures. Directed by Lew Landers, it stars James Dunn, Whitney Bourne, and Joan Woodbury. The film is a remake of the RKO film Rafter Romance (1933). It is one of the "lost RKO films" owned by Merian C. Cooper and only re-released in April 2007 when Turner Classic Movies acquired the rights and aired all six films on its channel.

== Plot ==
Gary Martin is a struggling artist living in the Venus de Milo Arms, a shabby apartment building in Greenwich Village. Another tenant, Mary Wilson, is also having trouble keeping up with her rent. The two do not know one another, but building manager Eli West arranges for them to live in the same basement apartment, him by day and her by night, at a reduced rate so he can re-rent Mary's apartment to the paying Ghonoff brothers, a Russian acrobatic team. Though they never see one another, Gary and Mary find plenty of traces of one another in the room, and begin leaving each other nasty notes asking the other to be more considerate. Their hostility for their unseen roommate escalates to the point that Mary fills Gary's tube of toothpaste with white paint, Gary sets alarm clocks all over the room to wake her up repeatedly at 3 a.m., and Mary puts Gary's paintings out for sale on the sidewalk, including a portrait he drew of her but did not allow her to see. The wind blows many of the paintings away before Gary can retrieve them.

Meanwhile, Gary has met Mary in a local diner and the two become interested in one another. Using assumed names, they get along wonderfully on their dates, while back in the apartment they plan more and more sinister ways to get back at their unseen roommate. Eventually, their identities are revealed after Gary's ex-girlfriend Edith Crumwell and Mary's new boss Ogilvie O. Oglethorpe show up at the apartment building to see them and end up falling in love. Unable to enter the same building with the other watching, Mary and Gary end their date by going to another café, where Mary sees the portrait Gary made of her in a window display for Crumwell's Sausages. Seeing her rage, Mary's friend Pete Ryan punches Gary, and Mary has him taken back to her room to recover. Gary wakes up in his own room and puts two and two together. When Mary realizes they have been each other's roommate all along she is at first angry, but then agrees to marry Gary.

== Cast ==
- James Dunn - Gary Martin
- Whitney Bourne - Mary Wilson
- Joan Woodbury - Edith Crumwell
- Solly Ward - Eli West
- Tom Kennedy - Pete Ryan
- Franklin Pangborn - Ogilvie O. Oglethorpe
- Ken Terrell - Ghonoff Brother (as Kenneth Terrell)
- James Fawcett - Ghonoff Brother
- Chester Clute - Jessup
- Evelyn Carter Carrington - Madame La Valley (as Evelyn Carrington)
- Etta McDaniel - Lizbeth (as Etta McDaniels)

== Production ==
Living on Love was based on the 1932 novel Rafter Romance by John Wells. It was a remake of RKO's pre-Code 1933 film Rafter Romance. The present film's working titles were Love in a Basement and The Sky's the Limit.

The film was one of the first assignments for costume designer Renié.

Filming took place in August 1937.

== Release ==
The film was released on November 12, 1937. It recorded a loss of $28,000 in its original release. It eventually grossed $135,000.

== Critical reception ==
The Cedar Rapids Gazette called the film "easy to watch and amusing". However, it did not see it as a vehicle to help James Dunn "regain that carefree, happy screen personality which hit its highest peaks when teamed with Sally Eilers". The Chicago Tribune praised the acting by Dunn and Bourne, but found little else to recommend the film. It called the dialogue "fast and unfunny". A modern review by AllMovie felt the earlier film, Rafter Romance, had more charm and better character development, but said this film "treats the same material in a more broadly comedic manner, sometimes moving into downright screwy territory". This review also noted the unusual casting of Franklin Pangborn, who usually played effeminate characters, as Mary's lascivious boss.

== Preservation status ==
Living in Love is one of six "lost RKO films" owned by producer Merian C. Cooper and only re-released in April 2007 when Turner Classic Movies acquired the rights and aired all six films on its channel. Cooper had accused RKO of not paying him all the money contractually due for the films he produced in the 1930s. A settlement was reached in 1946, giving Cooper complete ownership of six RKO titles:

- Rafter Romance (1933) with Ginger Rogers
- Double Harness (1933) with Ann Harding and William Powell
- The Right to Romance (1933) with Ann Harding and Robert Young
- One Man's Journey (1933) with Lionel Barrymore
- Living on Love (1937)
- A Man to Remember (1938)

According to an interview with a retired RKO executive, shown as a promo on TCM, Cooper withdrew the films, only allowing them to be shown on television in 1955–1956 in New York City.

In 2006, Turner Classic Movies, which had acquired the rights to the six films after extensive legal negotiations, broadcast them on TCM in April 2007, their first full public exhibition in over 70 years. TCM, in association with the Library of Congress and the Brigham Young University Motion Picture Archive, had searched many film archives throughout the world to find copies of the films in order to create new 35mm prints.
