= 7th Air Escadrille =

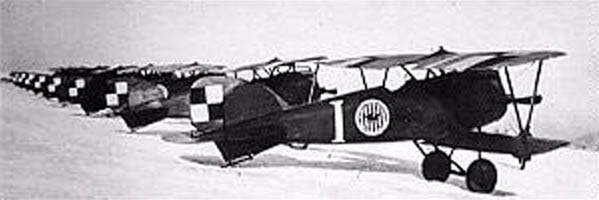
Albatros D.III (Oeffag) series 253 fighters of the escadrille at Lewandówka airfield in the winter of 1919-1920; the plane marked with a large I sign was flown by the escadrille's commanding officer, Cedric Faunt-le-Roy

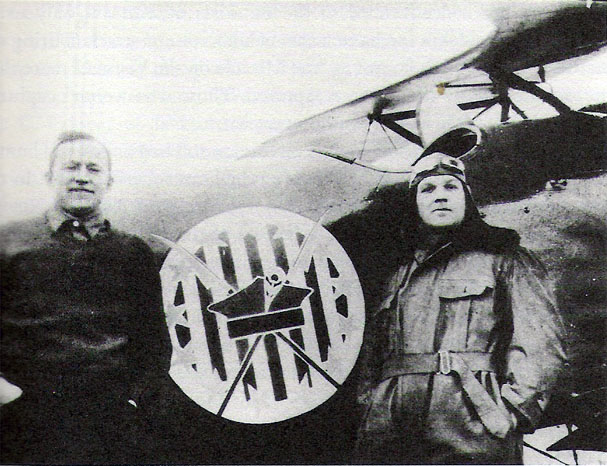
American volunteers, Merian C. Cooper and Cedric Fauntleroy, fighting in the Polish Air Force.

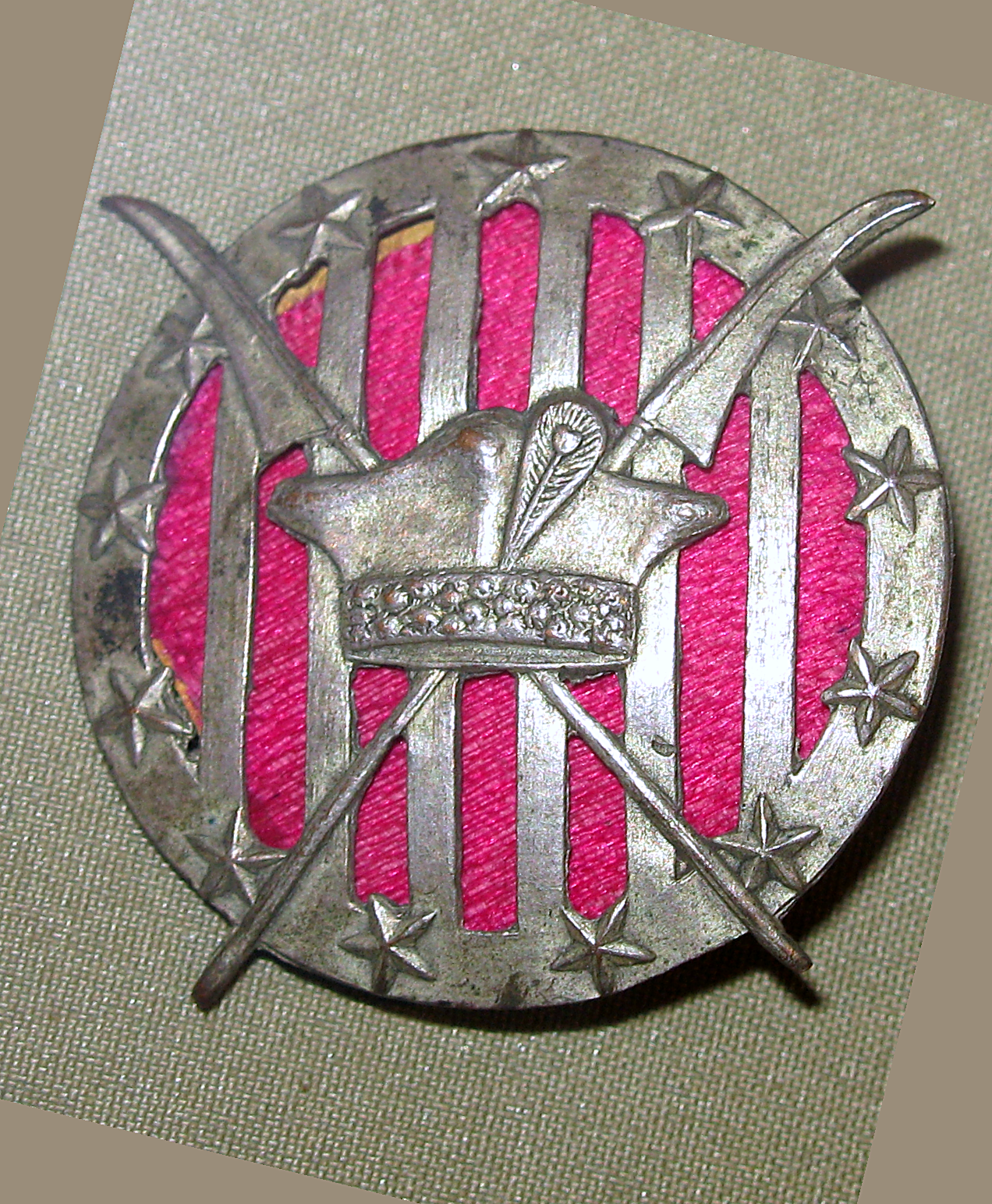
Polish 7th Air Escadrille emblem

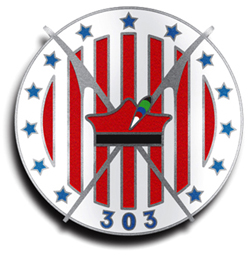
Insignia of the 303 Polish Squadron, during World War II, would be identical with that of the Kościuszko Squadron. The 303 Squadron honour badge had "303" added to the original Kościuszko Squadron emblem.

Polish 7th Air Escadrille (Polish: 7. Eskadra Lotnicza), better known as the Kościuszko Squadron, was one of the units of the Polish Air Force during the Polish-Soviet War of 1919-1921. Formed in late 1918, it was re-formed in late 1919 from US volunteers. It was one of the most active Polish squadrons in the war.

== Operational history ==
The unit was formed when Poland regained independence, on 7 November 1918 in Kraków, as the 3rd Air Escadrille, utilizing mostly bomber and reconnaissance aircraft left by Austro-Hungarian forces. On 25 November 1918 it was moved to Lwów (current Lviv), where it took active part in fighting of the Polish-Ukrainian War until June 1919. On 21 December 1918, after unification of Polish air units' names, its name was changed to the 7th Air Escadrille. It was commanded by Jerzy Boreysza, from April 1919 by Stefan Stec. Among pilots was World War I Ace Mieczysław Garsztka and Harvard graduate Edmund Pike Graves. Number of aircraft was variable, in May 1919 it possessed 3 fighters Fokker D.VIII (E.V), 3 reconnaissance Hansa-Brandenburg C.I and 1 LVG C.V. In June 1919 the escadrille was converted into fighter unit, then in September it was withdrawn into reserve. In October 1919 the commander became Ludomił Rayski.

In late 1919 eight American volunteers, including Major Cedric Fauntleroy and Captain Merian C. Cooper, arrived in Poland from France where in September 1919 they had been officially named the Kościuszko Squadron (after the Polish American hero Tadeusz Kościuszko) with Major Fauntleroy as its commander. After reaching Poland the men from Kościuszko Squadron joined the 7th Squadron. More pilots arrived during the following weeks - in all, there served 21 American pilots, along with several Polish pilots, including Ludwik Idzikowski, the ground crew was all Polish. In November 1919 Major Fauntleroy took the command and on 31 December 1919 the escadrille took the name Kościuszko Squadron. Meanwhile, the Polish Air Force underwent reorganization. Even though most volunteers asked to be sent to the frontlines as soon as possible, the Polish high command delayed their deployment in view of the coming Polish offensive.

The Kościuszko Squadron was the first air squadron to use a railway train as a mobile flying base with specially designed railroad cars that could transport their aircraft as the front moved and developed. The train also included the squadron's operational headquarters, aircraft spares and repair workshops and living quarters.

The Kościuszko Squadron was first used in the Kiev offensive in April 1920, rebasing from Lwów to Połonne. Its aircraft were Albatros D.III (Oef) fighters, supplemented by Ansaldo A.1 Balilla. Since there were no air encounters, primary missions became reconnaissance and ground attack. Most of the Squadron's flights were directed against Semyon Budionny's First Cavalry Army. The Squadron developed a tactic of low-altitude machine-gun strafing runs. Polish land commanders highly valued the contribution of the Kościuszko Squadron. General Puchucki of the 13th Infantry Division wrote in a report: "The American pilots, though exhausted, fight tenaciously. During the last offensive, their commander attacked enemy formations from the rear, raining machine-gun bullets down on their heads. Without the American pilots' help, we would long ago have been done for."

Merian Cooper was shot down but survived. Budionny had put half a million rubles on Captain Cooper's head, but when he was caught by the Cossacks he managed to convince them that he was a corporal. A few months later he escaped from a POW camp near Moscow to Latvia.

In August 1920 the Kościuszko Squadron took part in the defense of Lwów, and after the Battle of Warsaw it participated in the Battle of Komarów which crippled Budionny's cavalry. Most active days were August 16 and 17, when Escadrille, reduced to 5 uninjured pilots, fulfilled 18 ground attack missions each day.

After the Polish-Soviet War, in 1925 the 7th Kościuszko Squadron was reorganized as the 121st Fighter Squadron, eventually renamed as the Polish 111th Fighter Escadrille, each bearing the "Kościuszko" eponym. The 111th Squadron fought in the Invasion of Poland. Perhaps the most famous successor to the original Kościuszko Squadron would be the World War II No. 303 "Kościuszko" Polish Fighter Squadron (Warszawski im. Tadeusza Kościuszki), the most successful fighter squadron in the Battle of Britain.

== Squadron statistics ==
Faunt-le-Roy i jego eskadra w Polsce : dzieje Eskadry Kościuszki book cover

In 1920 the Kościuszko Squadron made over 400 combat flights.

Colonel Cedric E. Fauntleroy and Lt.- Col. Merian C. Cooper received Poland's highest military decoration: the Virtuti Militari. Other Kociuszko Squadron recipients of the Virtuti Militari included Major George M. Crawford, Captain Edward C. Corsi, Captain Władysław Konopka, 1st Lieut. Elliot W. Chess, 1st Lieut. Carl H. Clark, 1st Lieut. E. H. Noble, 1st Lieut. H. C. Rorison, 1st Lieut. K. O. Shrewsbury, 1st Lieut. Jerzy A. Weber and 2nd Lieut. A. Senkowski. Mieczyslaw Garsztka was to be awarded the Virtuti Militari posthumously.

== See also ==
- Antoni Mroczkowski of the 19th Escadrille
- No. 164 Squadron RAF—Argentine volunteers in the RAF during World War II
- Eagle Squadrons—American volunteers in the RAF during World War II
- Flying Tigers—American volunteers who fought for the ROC in the World War II (1941–1945)
- Soviet Volunteer Group—early volunteers who fought for the ROC in the Sino-Japanese War (1937–1945)
- Lafayette Escadrille—American volunteers in the French Air Service during World War I
