= Mieczysław Garsztka =

Polish flying ace

Mieczysław Sylwester Garsztka
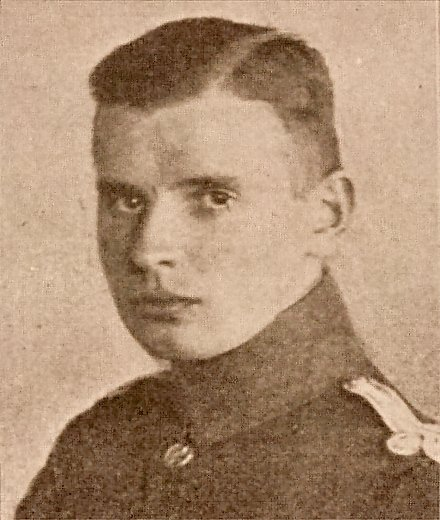
- Born: 31 December 1896; Bromberg, Province of Posen Imperial Germany (now Bydgoszcz, Poland)
- Died: 10 June 1919 (aged 22); Lwów, Poland (now Lviv, Ukraine)
- Burial place: Łyczakowski Cemetery
- Military career
- Allegiance: (German Empire) Germany; Poland
- Branch: German Air Force (Luftstreitkräfte); Polish Air Force
- Service years: 1915-1919
- Rank: Lieutenant; Podporucznik (Second Lieutenant)
- Nickname: Sylvester
- Units: Grenadier Regiment 110; 1st Nassau Infantry Regiment 87; Jagdstaffel 31 fighter squadron; 7th Air Escadrille
- Commands: 1st BN, 1st Nassau Infantry Regiment Nr. 87
- Conflicts: World War I 1915-1918; Polish–Ukrainian War 1918-1919
- Awards: Virtuti Militari (V class); Iron Cross (1st Class); Iron Cross (2nd Class)

Mieczysław Sylwester Garsztka (31 December 1896 - 10 June 1919) was a Polish pilot and a flying ace of the German air force during World War I and later the Polish air force during the Polish-Ukrainian War.

== World War I German service ==
He was born to a Polish family in Bromberg (Bydgoszcz). Some sources state his forename as Sylvester, but Mieczysław was his first name and was the one used by him. He intended to study medicine, but in November 1915 he was mobilized into the German army. Initially he served in the infantry on the Western Front with Grenadier Regiment 110 and Infantry Regiment 87. After completing officer training in April 1917 he became a Leutnant.

He was slightly injured commanding a company in the 1st battalion of the 1st Nassau Infantry Regiment Nr. 87, and was awarded the German Iron Cross 2nd class. Then he asked to be transferred to the air service, and in November 1917 he was sent to flying school.

After completing his flying training in Posen (Poznań), and then a fighter pilot course in Nivelles, he was assigned to Jagdstaffel 31 (Jasta 31) in St. Loup in Champagne on 7 June 1918. Initially he flew the Albatros D.V and later the Fokker D.VII fighter.

His combat career was short but successful. He shot down his first claim, a SPAD fighter, on 16 July 1918 and was given a fighter pilot badge. On 18 September he shot down an S.E.5a and a DH.9 bomber, then another DH.9 on 25 September. The following day he shot down a Sopwith Camel of No. 208 Squadron, and on 30 September he claimed his sixth (and last) kill, an S.E.5a. from No. 92 Squadron.

On 2 October he was wounded during combat with Camels of No. 46 Squadron RAF, but managed to land and was hospitalised. His probable victors were Captain Donald MacLaren, James Leith and Cyril H. Sawyer. Garsztka was the only pilot of Jasta 31 to become a fighter ace. On 25 September 1918 he was awarded the German Iron Cross 1st Class.

== Polish service ==
After the war, when Poland regained independence, Garsztka broke through the border to Poland and on 7 December 1918 joined the Polish Air Force. At first he was made an instructor pilot in Warsaw as he was skilled in German aircraft pilotage, but he asked to be sent to the front. At that time, the Polish forces were fighting with Ukrainian forces for control of Lwów (Lviv) and the surrounding area. On 9 May 1919 Garsztka was sent to the 7th Air Escadrille (later known as the Kościuszko Squadron) in Lwów. From 10 May to 7 June he undertook sixteen combat missions, mostly as a pilot of a bomber-reconnaissance LVG C.VI. Among others on 14 May, he flew three times bombing Ukrainian positions.

On 10 June 1919, Mieczysław Garsztka was killed in an air crash, flying a newly reconstructed SPAD S.VII fighter in Lwów. The cause of the crash was wing fabric failure. He was posthumously awarded the Virtuti Militari 5th Class. He was buried in Łyczakowski Cemetery.
