= Doctor Bull =

1933 film directed by John Ford

- Film poster
- Directed by: John Ford
- Written by: James Gould Cozzens; Paul Green; Philip Klein; Jane Storm
- Produced by: Winfield R. Sheehan
- Starring: Will Rogers; Vera Allen
- Cinematography: George Schneiderman
- Edited by: Louis R. Loeffler
- Distributed by: Fox Film Corporation
- Release date: September 22, 1933
- Running time: 77 minutes
- Country: United States
- Language: English

Doctor Bull is a 1933 American pre-Code comedy film directed by John Ford, based on the James Gould Cozzens novel The Last Adam. Will Rogers portrays a small-town doctor who must deal with a typhoid outbreak in the community.

The film was well praised by The New York Times, which noted that the story is similar to that of Lionel Barrymore's film One Man's Journey when it premiered at the Radio City Music Hall in New York City. Andy Devine met his future wife during the making of this picture. The film was one of Fox's biggest hits of the year.

== Plot ==
George Bull is a doctor in the small country town of New Winton. Dr. Bull spends most of his waking hours going from one house call to the next. What little free time he has is spent with his best friend Janet, a widow of five years, leading to much gossip amongst the townspeople.

Dr. Bull discovers a typhoid epidemic in New Winton and vaccinates the schoolchildren. This leads to the parents holding a town meeting to recall Dr. Bull. Fed up with the long hours and constant complaints, Dr. Bull tells them he doesn't care if he gets kicked out of town. However, the town meeting is adjourned without dismissing Dr. Bull.

After a serum he whipped up cures a cow of its paralysis, Dr. Bull tries it on a paralyzed man. The man walks again. Dr. Bull confesses his love toward Janet. They get married, and as they board the train to their honeymoon, they receive news that the medical community is astonished at Dr. Bull's new paralysis cure.

== Cast ==
- Will Rogers as Dr. George "Doc" Bull
- Vera Allen as Mrs. Janet "Jane" Cardmaker, widow of Charles Edward Cardmaker and Bull's girlfriend
- Marian Nixon as May Tupping, telephone operator
- Howard Lally as Joe Tupping
- Berton Churchill as Herbert Banning, Janet's brother
- Louise Dresser as Mrs. Herbert Banning
- Andy Devine as Larry Ward, soda jerk
- Rochelle Hudson as Virginia (Muller) Banning
- Tempe Pigott as Grandma Banning
- Elizabeth Patterson as Aunt Patricia Banning
- Nora Cecil as Aunt Emily Banning
- Ralph Morgan as Dr. Verney, owner of Verney Laboratory
- Effie Ellsler as Aunt Myra Bull
- Helen Freeman as Helen Upjohn, New Winton postmistress
- Francis Ford as Mr. Herring (uncredited)
- Charles Middleton as Mr. Upjohn (uncredited)
