= Double harness =

Double harness may refer to:

- Double Harness, 1933 movie
- Double Harness, play by Edward Poor Montgomery; see Double Harness
- Double Harness, 1904 novel by Anthony Hope
- Double harness, a horse harness for two horses side by side
