= Edmund Pike Graves =

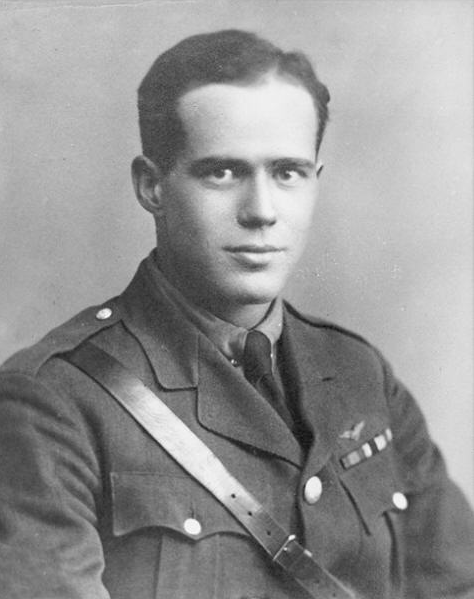
- Born: Edmund Pike Graves; March 13, 1891; Newburyport, Massachusetts, United States
- Died: November 22, 1919 (aged 28); Lwów, Poland
- Education: Harvard University
- Occupation: Military officer
- Military career
- Allegiance: United States; Poland
- Branch: Royal Air Force; Polish Air Force
- Service years: 1917–1919
- Rank: 1st Lieutenant (Royal Flying Corps); Poruchik (Polish Air Force)
- Conflicts: World War I; Polish-Soviet War
- Awards: Cross of Valour

Edmund Pike Graves (March 13, 1891 – November 22, 1919) was an American aviator, and Royal Flying Corps and Polish Air Force officer, the latter as a member of the Polish 7th Air Escadrille "Kościuszko Squadron", who served as an instructor and a fighter pilot during World War I and the Polish-Soviet War.

== Early life ==
Edmund Pike Graves was born in Newburyport, Massachusetts, United States, to Edmund Pike and Mary Warner (Caldwell) Graves. He graduated from the Middlesex School in Concord, Massachusetts, class of 1907 and from Harvard University, class of 1913.

== Military career ==
=== World War I ===
On July 9, 1917, Graves enlisted as a cadet in the Royal Flying Corps in Canada to avoid a delay in getting into a US Army's flying program. He was commissioned as a second lieutenant on October 29, 1917. Later, he was assigned as an instructor in aerial gunnery at the United States Army Air Service training facility at Camp Taliaferro, Hicks Field, Fort Worth, Texas. While station at Hicks Field, he became one of the first pilots to execute elaborate stunts in a Curtiss airplane. In early spring 1918, he was transferred to the Officers' School of Special Flying at Armour Heights, Toronto, Ontario, where he was promoted to first lieutenant in May, 1918. After spending most of his time during the war serving in Canada and stateside, Graves was finally posted overseas and arrived in France on November 5, 1918, just a few days before the signing of the Armistice agreement, which ended the war.

=== Service in Poland ===
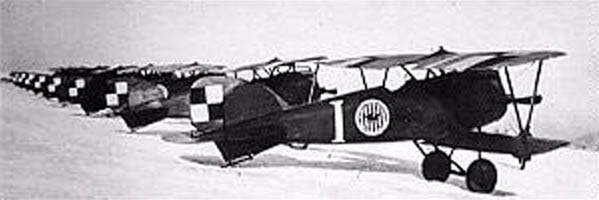
Polish Air Force Albatross aircraft in the "Kościuszko Squadron" at the Lewandówka Airfield in Lwów

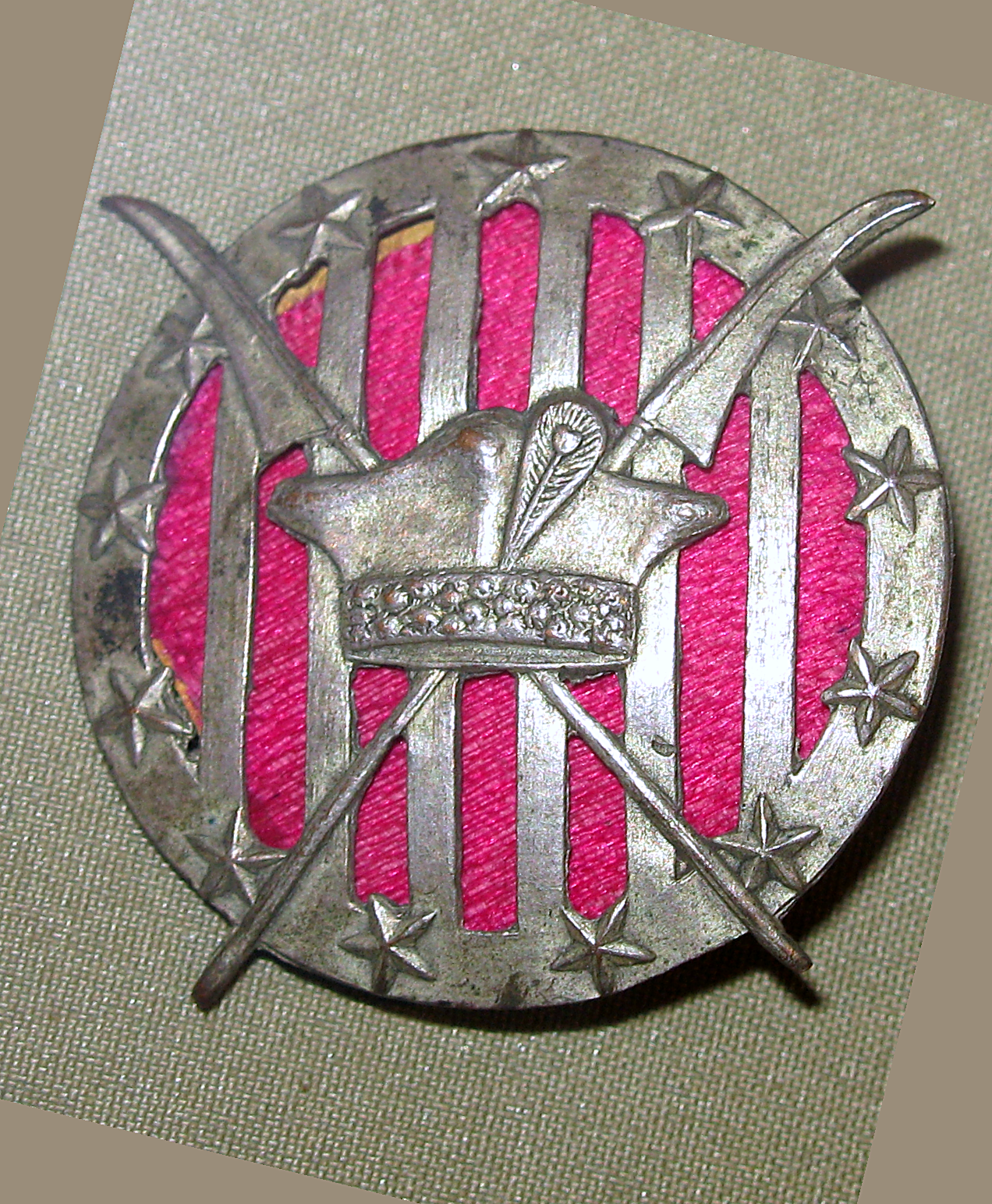
Polish 7th Air Escadrille emblem

After being demobilized from the Canadian RFC in July, 1919, he volunteered for the Kościuszko Squadron in the newly established Polish Air Force on October 12, 1919, and flew Albatross aircraft based out of the Lewandówka Airfield in Lwów (now Lviv, Ukraine), on patrols and scouting missions, over the front lines during the Polish-Soviet War.

He was considered an excellent pilot, but known for his risky flying. Merian C. Cooper, another American member of the Kosciuszko Squadron (and later famous film director) described him in his book as:

Lieutenant Graves took off into the sky. I remember it like it was yesterday. He accelerated the aircraft to an insane speed on the ground and then began to make a circle. Circling in this way he was making smaller and smaller circles until the lower wing of his plane was almost touching the ground. After finishing the circle, he took off and made the most difficult and the best air show I have ever seen.

Other members of the squadron pointed out his bravado and unnecessary risk associated with his airplane acrobatics, among them their commander, Cedric Fauntleroy. Merian Cooper himself wrote in his book, "He was undeniably the best pilot of us".

On November 22, 1919, the Polish inhabitants of Lwów celebrated the first anniversary of their successful defense of the city. On this occasion, four pilots of the Kosciuszko Squadron participated in an air show. One of them was Edmund Graves. Unfortunately, while performing acrobatics over the city in an Albatros D.III fighter, he had an accident; his aircraft lost its right wing during a double roll at 150 feet (46 m). Merian Cooper described it:

Graves was circling over the city, showing off his aviatic art, but was circling too low. Being over Potocki Palace, at an altitude of 200 feet, he performed a so-called “double barrel”. This is one of the most difficult maneuvers acrobatic pilots do. Aircraft was too weak for such performances; right wing of the airplane broke up and fell to the ground. Graves never lost his presence of mind in danger. In the blink of an eye, he could still grab a parachute and jump out of the falling machine. However, he was too low - the parachute failed to open and unfortunate Graves fell on his head and was killed instantly.

The funeral of Lieutenant Edmund Graves was held on November 24, 1919, and given high honors by the Polish government. The procession was attended by thousands of people, included military attachés form the French Military Mission to Poland. He is buried in Lviv in the Cemetery of the Defenders of Lwów (a part of Lyczakowski Cemetery), he was posthumously awarded the Cross of Valour.
