= Rafter Romance =

1933 comedy film directed by William A. Seiter

- Theatrical release poster
- Directed by: William A. Seiter
- Written by: Glenn Tryon (adaptation); H.W. Hanemann; Sam Mintz
- Based on: Rafter Romance; 1932 novel by John Wells
- Produced by: Merian C. Cooper; Kenneth Macgowan; Alexander McGaig (uncredited)
- Starring: Ginger Rogers; Norman Foster; George Sidney
- Cinematography: David Abel
- Edited by: James B. Morley
- Music by: Max Steiner
- Distributed by: RKO Radio Pictures
- Release date: September 1, 1933
- Running time: 72 minutes
- Country: United States
- Language: English

Rafter Romance is an American 1933 pre-Code romantic comedy film directed by William A. Seiter and released by RKO Radio Pictures. The film, which was based on the 1932 novel of the same name by John Wells, stars Ginger Rogers, Norman Foster and George Sidney, and features Robert Benchley, Laura Hope Crews and Guinn Williams.

== Plot ==
Mary Carroll is a young woman from upstate who came to New York City to find a job and a career, but whose money has almost run out. Both she and Jack Bacon, an aspiring artist who lives in the same Greenwich Village building, are behind on their rent and their landlord, Max Eckbaum, a good-natured soul who nevertheless has expenses to meet, comes up with a solution: Move Mary into Jack's loft and have them share the apartment on a shift basis. They would never see each other or know who the other is, since Jack is out all night and sleeps during the day, and Mary is taking a job selling refrigerators by telephone, which keeps her out all day.

However, both manage to get a very bad impression of each other after realizing the other is of the opposite sex from articles of clothing lying about. A series of misunderstandings leads to a series of pranks aimed at each other: Jack places a bucket in the shower, and when Mary goes in it falls on her head. Then she places Jack's suit in the shower, so that it gets wet. In retaliation, he saws Mary's bed in half so that it would come apart when she sits on it.

The situation gets complicated when the couple accidentally meet outside their apartment and, not knowing who the other is, begin to fall in love. Matters get worse when Mary's boss, lecherous H. Harrington Hubbell, tries to invite her out for dinner, while Jack's would-be "patron", a lonely, libidinous, rich older woman, Elise Peabody Willington Smythe, tries to maintain her monopoly over Jack.

When Jack accompanies Mary to a company picnic, they slip away from the group together and miss the bus back to town, forcing them to take a taxi. When they arrive at Jack's home, Mary realizes that Jack is her roommate. Trying to allay what he assumes are her suspicions about the arrangement, and unaware Mary is the person with whom he has been sharing the attic loft, Jack strongly denounces his co-tenant to her until the landlord comes and explains all.

Elise and Hubbell also arrive at the apartment, where Elise tries to bribe Mary, while a protective cabdriver, Fritzie, punches Hubbell, mistaking him for Jack. Realizing his mistake, Fritzie then goes to his cab where Jack is pleading with Mary. Fritzie is about to punch Jack when Mary intervenes, and the cab drives off with Jack and Mary kissing in the backseat. Asked if they will get married, the landlord says, "I arranged it."

== Cast ==
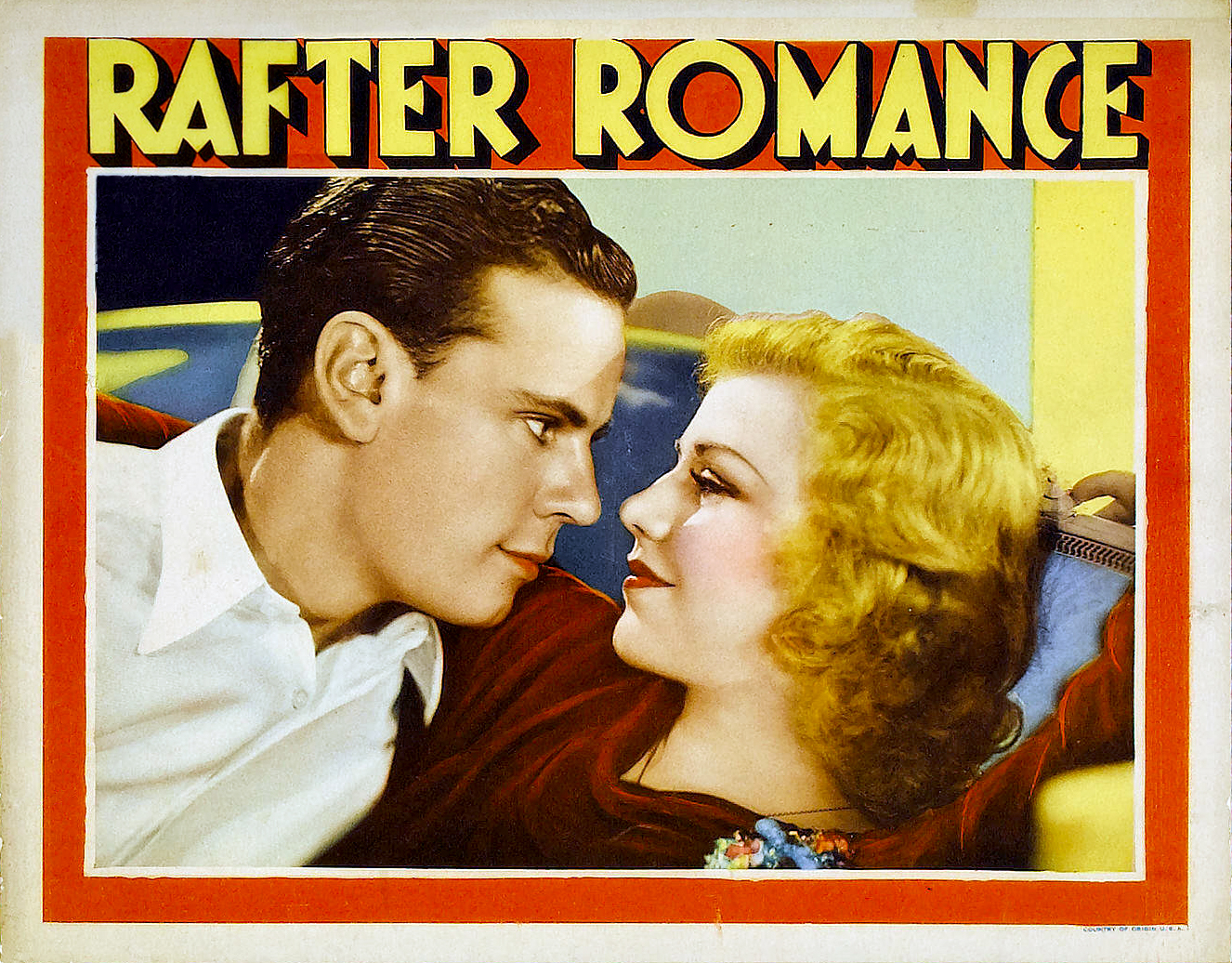
Norman Foster and Ginger Rogers in Rafter Romance

- Ginger Rogers as Mary Carroll
- Norman Foster as Jack Bacon
- George Sidney as Max Eckbaum
- Robert Benchley as H. Harrington Hubbell
- Laura Hope Crews as Elise Peabody Whittington Smythe
- Guinn Williams as Fritzie
- Sidney Miller as Julius Eckbaum

== Production ==
Production on Rafter Romance began in mid-June 1933. RKO initially announced that Joel McCrea and Dorothy Jordan would star in the film, and then paired Lew Ayres with Ginger Rogers, before casting Norman Foster as the male lead. Foster and Rogers had been teamed before on Young Man of Manhattan in 1930, and also made Professional Sweetheart together earlier in 1933.

Four years after the release of Rafter Romance, producer Merian C. Cooper re-made it as Living on Love, with James Dunn and Whitney Bourne, also for RKO. The plots of other films, including the German film Ich bei Tag und du bei Nacht (1932), the French film A Moi le jour, à toi nuit (1932) and the British Early to Bed (1933) have similarities to Rafter Romance, but are actually based on a completely separate screenplay by Robert Liebmann and János Székely.

Merian C. Cooper accused RKO of not paying him all the money contractually due for the films he produced in the 1930s. A settlement was reached in 1946, giving Cooper complete ownership of six RKO titles:

- Rafter Romance
- Double Harness (1933) with Ann Harding and William Powell
- The Right to Romance (1933) with Ann Harding and Robert Young
- One Man's Journey (1933) with Lionel Barrymore
- Living on Love (1937)
- A Man to Remember (1938)

According to an interview with a retired RKO executive, Cooper withdrew the films, only allowing them to be shown on television in 1955-1956 in New York City. In 2007 the films were shown at the Film Forum in New York, and Turner Classic Movies, which had acquired the rights to the six films after extensive legal negotiations, broadcast them, their first full public exhibition in over 70 years. TCM, in association with the Library of Congress and the Brigham Young University Motion Picture Archive, had searched many film archives throughout the world to find copies of the films in order to create new 35mm prints.
