= Helen Freeman (actress) =

American actress (1886–1960)

Helen Freeman Corle
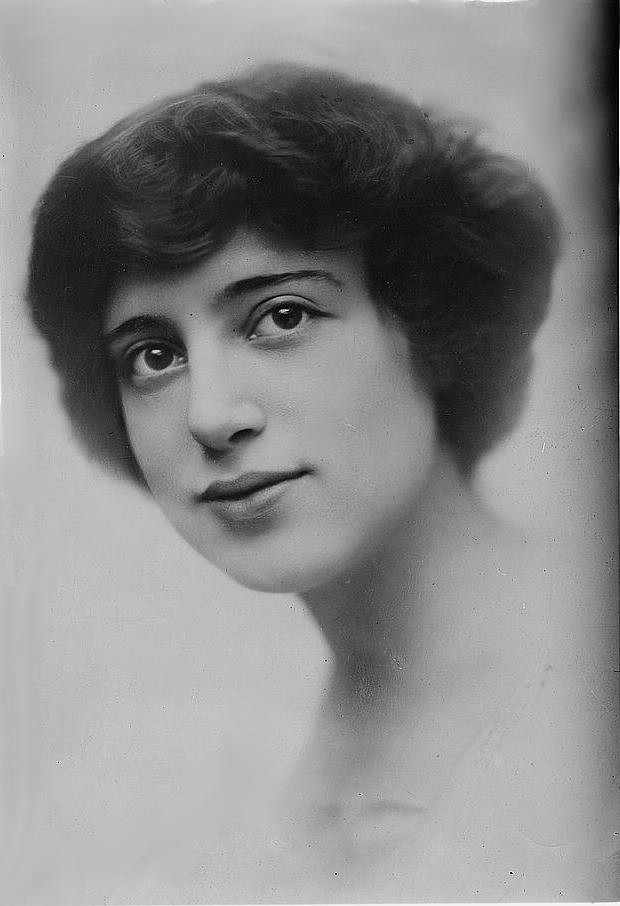
- Freeman circa 1913
- Born: Helen Freeman Corle; August 3, 1886; St. Louis, Missouri, U.S.
- Died: December 25, 1960 (aged 74); Los Angeles, California, U.S.
- Resting place: Grand View Memorial Park Cemetery, Glendale, California
- Occupation: Actress
- Years active: 1908–1947
- Spouse: Edwin Corle (m. 1932)

Helen Freeman Corle (August 3, 1886 – December 25, 1960) was an American actress.

== Biography ==
Freeman was born in St. Louis to Benjamin N. Freeman, a banker. In 1932, she married Edwin Corle in Ensenada, Mexico.

She died in Los Angeles at the age of 74, and was cremated. A plaque for Corle is at Grand View Memorial Park Cemetery in Glendale, California.

== Filmography ==
Year	Title	Role	Notes
1915	The Morals of Marcus	Dora	Lost film
1915	Are You a Mason?	Helen Perry	Lost film
1930	Abraham Lincoln	Nancy Hanks Lincoln	
1932	Symphony of Six Million	Miss Spencer - Felix's Nurse	
1932	Rasputin and the Empress	Hysterical Woman About to Be Shot	Uncredited
1933	Hold Your Man	Miss Davis	
1933	The Song of Songs	Fräulein Von Schwertfeger	
1933	Doctor Bull	Helen Upjohn, New Winton Postmistress	
1933	Chance at Heaven	Franklyn's Guest	Uncredited
1933	Fog	Madame Alva	
1933	The Right to Romance	Mrs. Preble	
1934	Nana	Sabine Muffat	
1934	Fashions of 1934	Mme. Margot—Paris Model Supervisor	Uncredited
1934	Finishing School	Dr. Hewitt	
1934	Sadie McKee	Brennan's Maid	Uncredited
1934	Stamboul Quest	Sister Ursula	Uncredited
1935	Spring Tonic	Mrs. Ingalls	
1935	Doubting Thomas	Mrs. Sheppard	
1935	Anna Karenina	Barbara	Uncredited
1935	The Last Days of Pompeii	Martha	Uncredited
1935	Ah, Wilderness!	Miss Hawley	
1937	Bulldog Drummond Comes Back	Irena Soldanis	
1937	Madame X	Nurse	Uncredited
1938	Safety in Numbers	Mrs. Stewart	
1938	Always in Trouble	Miss Penny	Uncredited
1944	The Heavenly Body	Stella	
1944	Mademoiselle Fifi	The Countess de Breville	
1944	Our Hearts Were Young and Gay	Mrs. Smithers	Uncredited
1944	Mrs. Parkington	Helen Stilham	
1945	Don Juan Quilligan	Mrs. John Blake	Uncredited
1945	Saratoga Trunk	Mrs. Nicholas Dulaine	
1946	The Unknown	Phoebe Martin	
1946	Monsieur Beaucaire	Queen of Spain	Uncredited
1946	So Dark the Night	Widow Bridelle	
1947	The Pilgrim Lady	Aunt Phoebe	
1947	The Late George Apley	Lydia	Uncredited
1947	The Ghost and Mrs. Muir	Author Displaced by Lucy	Uncredited
1948	The Loves of Carmen	Shopkeeper	Uncredited
