= Edwin Corle =

American writer (1906–1956)

Edwin Corle (May 7, 1906 – June 11, 1956) was an American writer.

== Biography ==
He was born in Wildwood, New Jersey, and educated at the University of California, Berkeley, where he received his A.B. in 1928. For the next two years, he was a graduate student at Yale University.

In 1932 he married Helen Freeman in Ensenada, Mexico.

He served in World War II, and in 1944, married Jean Armstrong. His prolific writing career led to a final residence at Hope Ranch, Santa Barbara, where he died on June 11, 1956.

== Writing ==
His writing is noted for realistic portrayals of American Indian life in the early 20th century. After a brief stint at writing for radio, Corle began writing numerous short stories and non-fiction pieces for magazines. In 1934 his Mojave: A Book Of Stories was published. This was followed a year later by his first and most successful novel, Fig Tree John, based on a Cahuilla Indian from southern California. In addition to other novels, Corle also wrote non-fiction, including books on the Grand Canyon and the Gila River. His sophisticated interest in the arts is reflected in his works on Igor Stravinsky and the artist Merle Armitage. In the 1950s, Corle began what was to be his most important effort, a multi-volume novel called "The Californians". The work was left uncompleted upon his death and is included in his extensive papers, letters and manuscripts donated by Ralph B. Sipper of Santa Barbara to Indiana University in 1997. Another important collection of his papers, including correspondence with Lawrence Clark Powell, is in the Special Collections of UCLA.

== Legacy ==
For many years, the Library of the University of California at Santa Barbara has sponsored an Edwin and Jean Corle Lecture Series.

== Bibliography ==
=== Novels ===
- Fig Tree John (Liveright, 1935)
- People on the Earth (Random House, 1937)
- Burro Alley (Duell, Sloan & Pearce, 1938)
- Solitaire (E. P. Dutton, 1940)
- Coarse Gold (E.P. Dutton, 1942)
- Three Ways to Mecca (Duell, Sloan and Pearce, 1947)
- In Winter Light (Duell, Sloan and Pearce, 1949)
- Billy the Kid (Duell, Sloan and Pearce, 1953)

=== Stories ===
- Mojave (Liveright, 1934)

=== "Americana", Biography and Nonfiction ===
- Desert Country (Duell, Sloan and Pearce, 1941) — American Folkways series, edited by Erskine Caldwell
- Listen, Bright Angel: A Panorama of the Southwest (Duell, Sloan and Pearce, 1946)
- John Studebaker: An American Dream (E. P. Dutton, 1948)
- The Royal Highway (El Camino Real) (Bobbs-Merrill, 1949)
- The Gila: River of the Southwest (Rinehart, 1951) — Rivers of America series
- The Story of the Grand Canyon (Duell, Sloan and Pearce, 1951)
- Death Valley and the Creek Called Furnace (Ward Ritchie Press, 1962) — Photographs by Ansel Adams
