= Kościuszko's Squadron =

Kościuszko Squadron
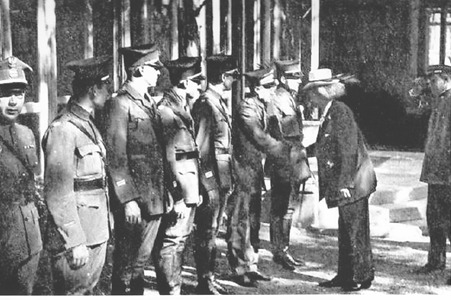
- American aviators in Paris meet Ignacy Jan Paderewski, prime minister of Poland, in 1919
- Active: December 1919
- Allegiance: Second Polish Republic
- Branch: Polish Air Force
- Type: Fighter squadron
- Patron: Tadeusz Kościuszko
- Engagements: Polish–Soviet War

Insignia
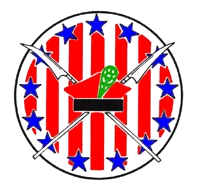
- Roundel

Aircraft flown
- Fighter: Albatros D.III (Oeffag), Ansaldo A.1 Balilla

The Kościuszko Squadron (officially: Polish 7th Air Escadrille) was a Polish Air Force fighter squadron established in late 1919 by Merian C. Cooper, an American aviator who would go on to direct the film King Kong in 1933, then to advocate for McCarthyism in 1950s.

The unit was named after Tadeusz Kościuszko, and Major Cedric Fauntleroy became its commander. The squadron's insignia was designed by Elliot William Chess (1899–1962), an American pilot serving with the Polish Army during the Polish–Soviet War.

To encourage the recruitment of Americans of Polish descent, the Polish military set up a unit called the Polish–American Air Group.

The most famous successor to this original Kościuszko Squadron was the World War II No. 303 "Kościuszko" Polish Fighter Squadron (Warszawski im. Tadeusza Kościuszki), the most successful fighter squadron in the Battle of Britain.

== Formation ==
First formed after Poland regained independence following World War I, it consisted of a small group of American volunteers independent of the United States State Department or the American Expeditionary Forces. The fliers came from a number of militaries. Members included Ludomił Rayski (commander and of the Turkish Air Force), Jerzy Weber (of the Imperial Russian Air Service), Władysław Konopka , Aleksander Seńkowski (of the Austrian Air Service), and Ludwik Idzikowski (of the Imperial Russian Air Service).

One of the most famous pilots was Merian C. Cooper, producer of the 1933 movie King Kong, who was decorated for valor by Polish commander-in-chief Józef Piłsudski with the highest Polish military decoration, the Virtuti Militari. During World War II the Kościuszko Squadron was formed by refugee Polish pilots who joined the Royal Air Force and played an essential role during the Battle of Britain.

The Kościuszko Squadron emblem depicts the distinctive four-cornered Polish peasant cap characteristic to the Małopolska region with a peacock feather inside, set against a field of seven red vertical stripes on a white background (forming six white stripes as a result) from the flag of the United States, red and white also being two colors contained in both the Polish and American flags as well as representing the striped trousers of traditional małopolska men's folk dress. Behind the red cap is a pair of crossed war scythes. Thirteen blue stars encircle the badge, representing the thirteen original American states. The rogatywka cap and scythes commemorate the Kościuszko Uprising of 1794: ten years after General Tadeusz Kościuszko returned to Poland from America, and led a Polish insurgency marked by peasant participation (himself donning the traditional folk dress of the peasants in the region of Kraków, where the uprising was proclaimed) in an attempt to liberate Poland from Russia and Prussia. This later led to a mistaken belief that the simple to make polearms used by many footmen in the uprising were in fact actual scythes used for shearing wheat.

== See also ==
- Blue Army – Polish Army unit partly made up of North Americans of Polish ancestry
- Lafayette Escadrille – French squadron of American pilots
