= Cedric Fauntleroy =

Polish air force officer

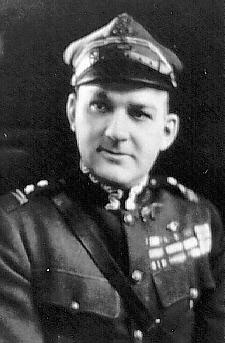
- Cedric E. Fauntleroy in his Polish Air Service uniform. (U.S. Air Force photo)
- Born: 1891
- Died: 1963 (aged 71–72)

Cedric Errol Fauntleroy (1891–1963) was an American pilot who in 1919 volunteered to serve in the Polish Air Force during the Polish-Soviet War of 1919–1921.

Born near Natchez, Mississippi, Fauntleroy served with Eddie Rickenbacker's 94th Fighter Squadron on the Western Front in World War I.

Recruited by his fellow veteran Merian C. Cooper in 1919, he became one of the best pilots of the Polish 7th Air Escadrille, dubbed the Kościuszko Escadrille (the Kosciuszko Squadron, named for Polish and American national hero Tadeusz Kościuszko). He was promoted to colonel and he received Poland's highest military decoration: the Virtuti Militari, besides being awarded the Cross of Valour four times.
