= The Right to Romance =

1933 film by Alfred Santell

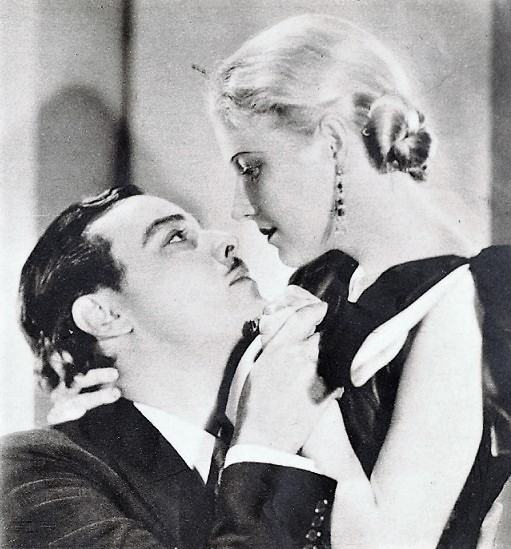
- Still with Nils Asther and Ann Harding
- Directed by: Alfred Santell
- Screenplay by: Sidney Buchman; Henry McCarty
- Story by: Myles Connolly
- Produced by: Merian C. Cooper
- Starring: Ann Harding; Robert Young; Nils Asther
- Cinematography: Lucien Andriot
- Edited by: Ralph Dietrich
- Music by: Max Steiner
- Production company: RKO Radio Pictures
- Distributed by: RKO Radio Pictures
- Release date: November 17, 1933
- Running time: 65, 67 or 70 minutes
- Country: United States
- Language: English

The Right to Romance is a 1933 American pre-Code drama film starring Ann Harding and Robert Young and released by RKO Radio Pictures.

== Plot ==
A successful plastic surgeon meets a local playboy and impulsively marries him.

== Cast ==
- Ann Harding as Dr. Peggy Simmons
- Robert Young as Bobby Preble
- Nils Asther as Dr. Helmuth Heppling
- Sari Maritza as Lee Joyce
- Irving Pichel as Dr. Beck
- Helen Freeman as Mrs. Preble
- Alden Chase as Bunny Allen
- Delmar Watson as Bill
- Louise Carter as The dowager
- Bramwell Fletcher as The boy
- Patricia O'Brien as Eve Lane
- Howard Hickman as Dr. Macey
- Thelma Hardwick as Sister Elizabeth

== Preservation status ==
This is one of the "lost RKO films" owned by Merian C. Cooper and only re-released in April 2007 when Turner Classic Movies acquired the rights and showed all six films on TCM.

Cooper accused RKO of not paying him all the money contractually due for the films he produced in the 1930s. A settlement was reached in 1946, giving Cooper complete ownership of six RKO titles:

- Rafter Romance (1933) with Ginger Rogers
- Double Harness (1933) with Ann Harding and William Powell
- The Right to Romance (1933)
- One Man's Journey (1933) with Lionel Barrymore
- Living on Love (1937)
- A Man to Remember (1938)

According to an interview with a retired RKO executive, shown as a promo on TCM, Cooper withdrew the films, only allowing them to be shown on television in 1955–1956 in New York City.

In 2006, Turner Classic Movies, which had acquired the rights to the six films after extensive legal negotiations, broadcast them on TCM in April 2007, their first full public exhibition in over 70 years. TCM, in association with the Library of Congress and the Brigham Young University Motion Picture Archive, had searched many film archives throughout the world to find copies of the films in order to create new 35mm prints.
