= One Man's Journey =

1933 film by John S. Robertson

- lobby card
- Directed by: John S. Robertson; Charles Kerr (assistant)
- Screenplay by: Lester Cohen; Sam Ornitz
- Based on: Failure; 1932 story in American Magazine by Katharine Haviland-Taylor
- Produced by: Pandro S. Berman; Merian C. Cooper
- Starring: Lionel Barrymore; May Robson; Dorothy Jordan; Joel McCrea; Frances Dee; David Landau
- Cinematography: Jack MacKenzie
- Edited by: Arthur Roberts
- Music by: Max Steiner
- Distributed by: RKO Radio Pictures
- Release date: September 8, 1933
- Running time: 72 minutes
- Language: English

One Man's Journey is a 1933 American pre-Code drama film starring Lionel Barrymore as Dr. Eli Watt. The picture was based on the short story Failure written by Katharine Haviland-Taylor. It was remade by RKO as A Man to Remember (1938). The story tells of a small-town doctor working under difficult circumstances in a rural area somewhere in the United States.

== Plot ==
A kind selfless doctor maintains his practice in a small town over 19 yrs. Despite opportunities to chart a bigger career path, his commitment to his patients continually keeps him where he is.

He is eventually offered a prestigious position in New York at the same time his son, also to practice medicine, heads off to Vienna. A near fatal dose of iodine taken by the despaired woman (Letty) he helped raise, again keeps him where he is.

The years go by as he writes short notes reflecting on his situation. One reads, "an old country plug, That's all I was meant to be - ".

Letty falls ill again, this time from heartache and fatigue due to her husband's infidelity. Sensing something beyond the physical is ailing Letty, he confronts the husband and receives his confession. He adjusts his care to include allowing Bill to visit his wife Letty.

After her recovery, great physicians from New York are meeting nearby when he receives an invitation. To his surprise, the Honouree honours him instead and he's so humbled he tears up resting his head on his dinner plate. Later a scene shows him being escorted by his housekeeper Sarah to Niagara Falls. Her doing, not his. A funnier note for the good doctor.

== Cast ==
- Lionel Barrymore as Dr. Eli Watt
- May Robson as Sarah
- Dorothy Jordan as Letty McGinnis
- Joel McCrea as Jimmy Watt
- Frances Dee as Joan Stockton
- David Landau as McGinnis
- Buster Phelps as Jimmy Watt (at age 6)
- June Filmer as May Radford
- James Bush as Bill Radford
- Oscar Apfel as John Radford
- Samuel S. Hinds as Dr. Babcock (as Sam Hinds)
- Hale Hamilton as Dr. Tillinghast
- Colin Kenny as Doctor at Banquet
- John Ince as Dr. James Carson
- Lloyd Ingraham as Townsman at Farewell Meeting
- Dave O'Brien as Dance Extra
- Frank O'Connor as Patient on Telephone
- Russ Powell as Townsman in Front of Post Office
- Forrest Taylor as Doctor at Banquet
- Lucille Ward as Sick Boy's Mother

== Reception ==
The film was popular at the box office.

== Preservation status ==
In April 2007, Turner Classic Movies (TCM) premiered six films produced by Merian C. Cooper at RKO which had been out of distribution for more than 50 years. (A retired RKO executive stated in an interview used as a promo on TCM for the premiere that Cooper did allow the films to be shown in 1955–1956 in a limited re-release and only in New York City.)

According to TCM host Robert Osborne, Cooper agreed to a legal settlement in 1946, after accusing RKO of not giving him all the money due him from his producer's contract in the 1930s. The settlement gave Cooper complete ownership of six titles: Rafter Romance (1933), Double Harness (1933), The Right to Romance (1933), One Man's Journey (1933), Stingaree (1934), Living on Love (1937), and A Man to Remember (1938).

When Turner Broadcasting bought the RKO film library in 1987, the six films were not included[4] and the rights had to be purchased separately. The film's remake, A Man To Remember, was unable to be found. The original copies of the film's negative were destroyed due to negligence and the film was thought to have been lost forever. However, a 35mm, original nitrate print with Dutch subtitles was discovered in the Netherlands. It is the only known surviving copy and was restored by TCM.

In 2000, A Man to Remember was preserved by the Netherlands Film Museum.
