= Double Harness =

1933 film

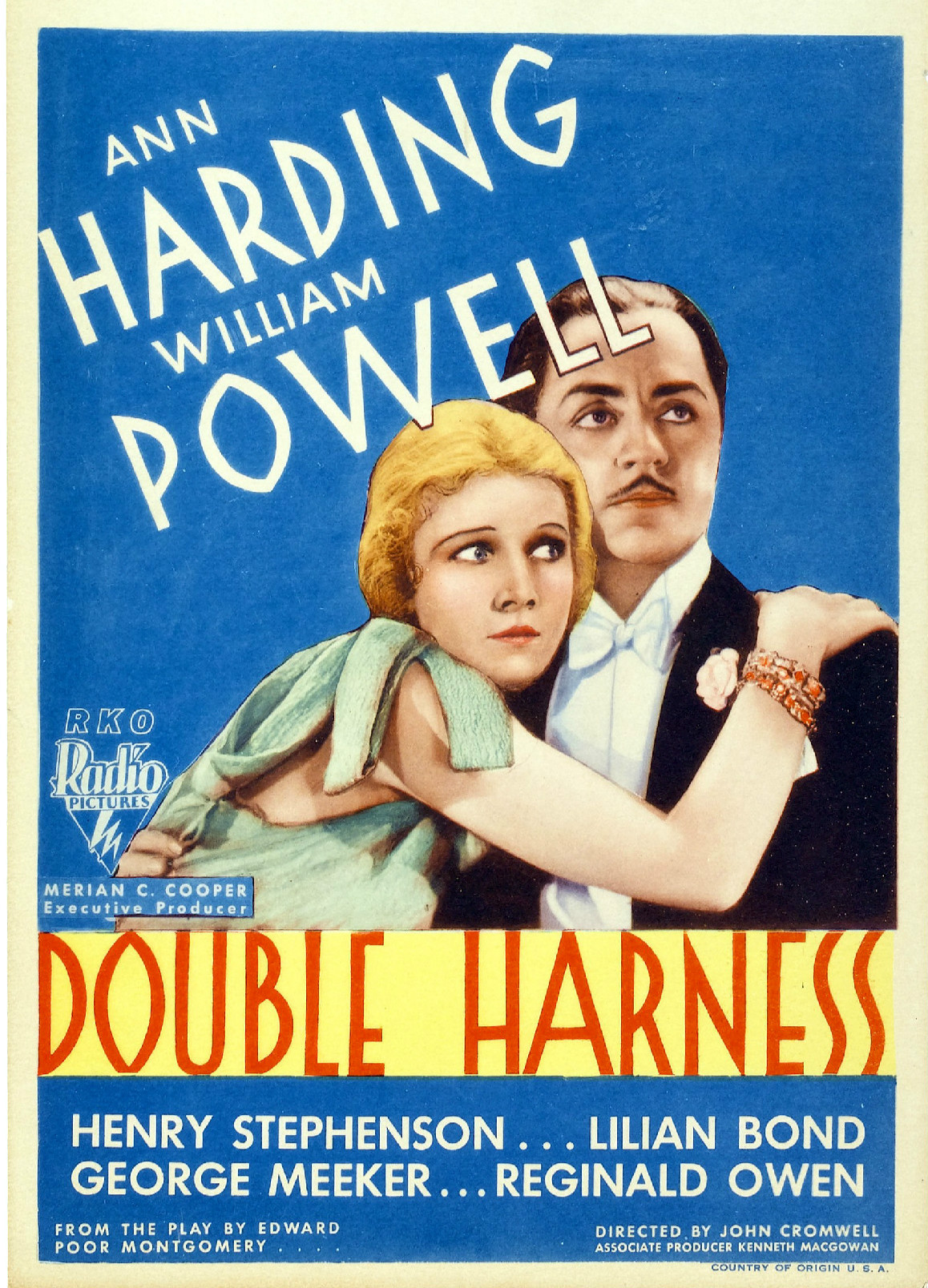
- Theatrical Film Poster
- Directed by: John Cromwell
- Written by: Jane Murfin
- Based on: Double Harness; 1933 play by Edward Poor Montgomery
- Produced by: Kenneth Macgowan; Merian C. Cooper (exec. producer)
- Starring: Ann Harding; William Powell
- Cinematography: J. Roy Hunt
- Edited by: George Nicholls, Jr.
- Music by: Max Steiner
- Distributed by: RKO Radio Pictures
- Release date: July 21, 1933
- Running time: 69-70 minutes
- Country: United States
- Language: English
- Budget: $329,000
- Box office: $493,000

Double Harness (1933) is an American pre-Code drama film starring Ann Harding and William Powell. It was based on the play of the same name by Edward Poor Montgomery. A young woman maneuvers a lazy playboy into marrying her.

This was one of several films, all produced by Merian C. Cooper at RKO, that were out of distribution for more than 50 years as a result of a legal settlement that gave Cooper complete ownership of the films. Turner Classic Movies eventually acquired the rights to the films.

== Plot ==
When spoiled younger sister Valerie Colby becomes engaged to Dennis Moore, a more level-headed Joan decides to follow her example, not because she is in love, but in order to make something of herself. She chooses unambitious, wealthy playboy John Fletcher, who owns a struggling shipping line.

She eventually spends the night in his apartment. To Joan's annoyance, she finds herself falling in love with him. When he shows no interest in marrying her, she forces the issue. She arranges for her father, Colonel Sam Colby, to find them in a compromising position. John graciously agrees to do the honorable thing and marry her. However, on their honeymoon cruise, he lets her know that he expects her to grant him a divorce after a decent interval. They settle on six months.

Joan prods her husband into taking an interest in his family business. To his surprise, he finds that he enjoys it. As the new Postmaster General is a good friend of her father's, Joan invites him to dinner, hoping to land a government contract for John's company.

Meanwhile, Valerie goes into debt due to her extravagant spending habits and borrows from her big sister over and over again. Joan gives Valerie all she can afford without touching John's money. Finally, she pawns her mother's ring for half the $1000 Valerie needs, but tells her that it is the last time.

That same day, John finally realizes that he loves his wife. However, when he goes home, Valerie goes to John behind Joan's back and cons him into giving her a check. Joan finds out in time and tears up the check. In her anger, Valerie blurts out how Joan trapped John into marriage.

Disillusioned, he turns to his former paramour, Mrs. Monica Page. Joan goes to John's old apartment and confesses all, including the fact that she has fallen in love with him, to no avail. She then tries to salvage her dinner party. To her delight, John shows up and makes it clear that he believes and forgives her.

== Cast ==
- Ann Harding as Joan Colby
- William Powell as John Fletcher
- Lucile Browne as Valerie Colby
- Henry Stephenson as Colonel Sam Colby
- Lilian Bond as Monica Page
- George Meeker as Dennis Moore
- Reginald Owen as Freeman, John's butler
- Kay Hammond as Eleanor Weston, Joan's friend
- Leigh Allen as Leonard Weston
- Hugh Huntley as Farley Drake, an acquaintance who offers to give Valerie money, but expects something in return
- Wallis Clark as Postmaster General Oliver Lane

Gene Malin was cut from a role in the film by RKO studio president B. B. Kahane; disgusted by Malin's flamboyance, said, "I do not think we ought to have this man on the lot on any picture — shorts or features".

== Preservation status ==
This is one of the "lost RKO films" owned by Merian C. Cooper and only re-released in April 2007 when Turner Classic Movies acquired the rights and showed all six films on TCM.

Cooper accused RKO of not paying him all the money contractually due for the films he produced in the 1930s. A settlement was reached in 1946, giving Cooper complete ownership of six RKO titles:

- Rafter Romance (1933) with Ginger Rogers
- Double Harness
- The Right to Romance (1933) with Ann Harding and Robert Young
- One Man's Journey (1933) with Lionel Barrymore
- Living on Love (1937)
- A Man to Remember (1938)

According to an interview with a retired RKO executive, shown as a promo on TCM, Cooper withdrew the films, only allowing them to be shown on television in 1955–1956 in New York City.

TCM, which had acquired the rights to the six films after extensive legal negotiations, broadcast them on TCM in April 2007, their first full public exhibition in over 70 years. TCM, in association with the Library of Congress and the Brigham Young University Motion Picture Archive, had searched many film archives throughout the world to find copies of the films in order to create new 35mm prints.

== Reception ==
According to RKO records, the film made $10,000 in profit.
