= Ansaldo A.1 Balilla =

1917 Italian fighter aircraft

A.1 Balilla
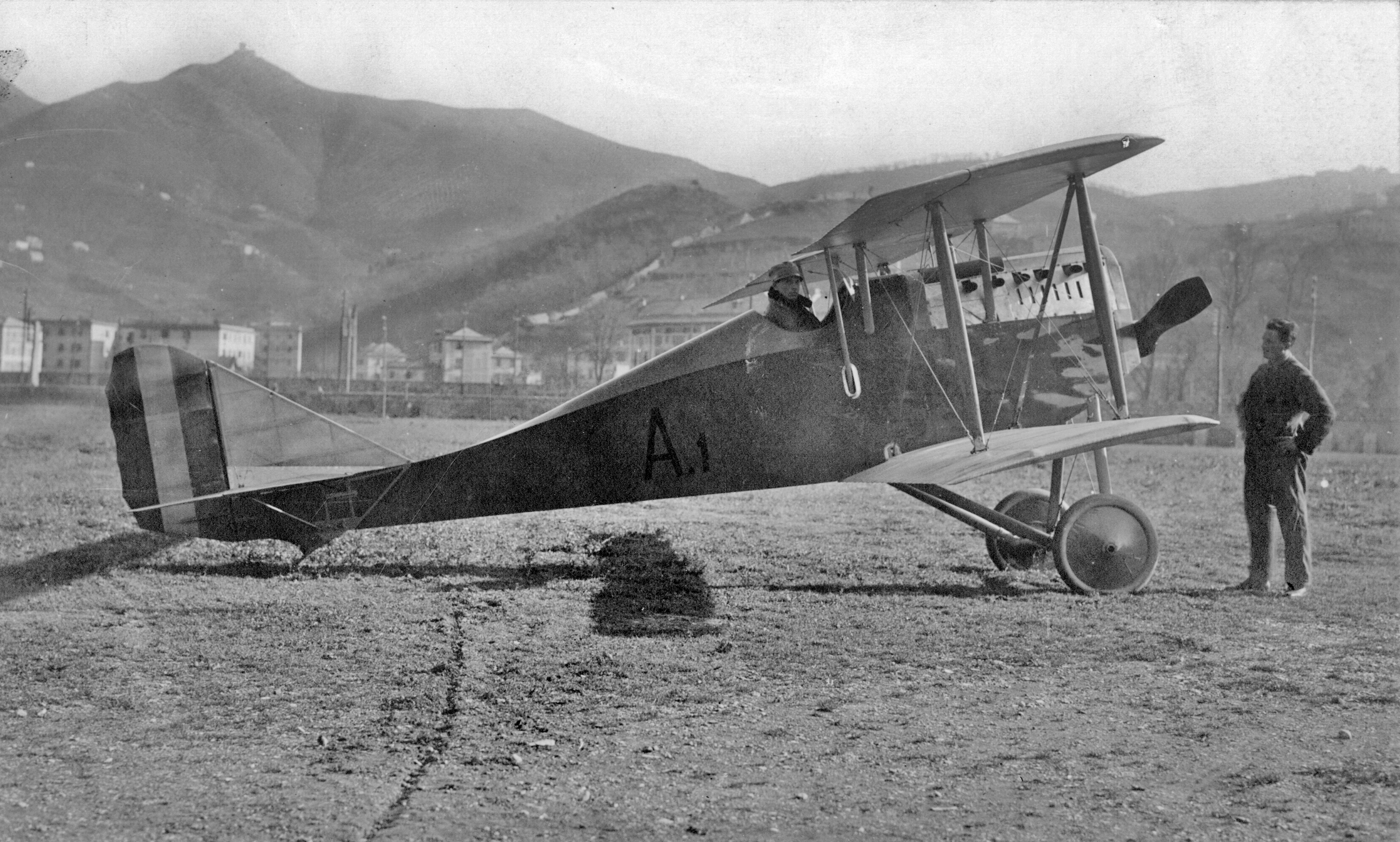

General information
- Type: Fighter
- Manufacturer: Gio. Ansaldo & C.
- Designer: Umberto Savoia, Rodolfo Verduzio, and Giuseppe Brezzi
- Status: Retired
- Primary users: Italian Air Force Polish Air Force
- Number built: ~250 by Ansaldo, 57 by Lublin under licence

History
- Manufactured: 1917-1924
- Introduction date: 1918
- First flight: March 1917

The Ansaldo A.1, nicknamed "Balilla" after the Genoan folk-hero, was Italy's only domestically-designed fighter aircraft of World War I to be produced in Italy. Arriving too late to see any real action, it was however used by both Poland and the Soviet Union in the Polish-Soviet War of 1919–1921.

== Development ==
The A.1 resulted from ongoing efforts by the Ansaldo company to create a modern fighter. The SVA.5 had proved unsuitable in this role, although it made an excellent reconnaissance aircraft and had been ordered into production as such. Ansaldo engineer Giuseppe Brezzi revised the SVA.5, reducing the size of the upper wing, and replacing the SVA's transverse Warren truss interplane struts, which had eliminated the need for spanwise-exposed flying and landing wires, with conventional wire braced struts. While this produced more drag, it increased the stiffness of the wing structure, improving manoeuvrability. Engine power was increased to 150 kW (200 hp) and a safety system to jettison the fuel tank through a ventral hatch (in case of onboard fire) was installed.

The first prototype was completed in July 1917, but air force acceptance took until December. Test pilots were not enthusiastic. While they found a marked increase in performance over the SVA.5, the A.1 was still not as maneuverable as the French-built and designed types in use by Italy's squadrons, most notably the Nieuport 17, which was also produced by Macchi in Italy. This resulted in a number of modifications, including a slight enlargement of the wings and rudder, and a further 10% increase in engine power. This proved satisfactory to the air force, and the modified A.1, designated A.1bis, was ordered into service with 91 Squadriglia for further evaluation.

Reports from pilots were mixed. While the fighter's speed was impressive, it still proved to be too unmanoeuvrable and difficult to fly. Nevertheless, with an urgent requirement to replace obsolete fighters in service, the air force ordered the A.1 regardless.

== Operational history ==
The first of an original order of 100 machines entered service in July 1918. The A.1s were kept away from the front lines and mostly assigned to home defence duties. In the four months before the Armistice, Italian ace Leopoldo Eleuteri scored the only confirmed aerial victory in an A.1, over an Austrian reconnaissance aircraft. It was during this time that Ansaldo engaged in a number of promotional activities, including dubbing the aircraft as Balilla, flying displays in major Italian cities, and in August donating an example to Italian aviator Antonio Locatelli as his personal property amidst a press spectacle. (This latter publicity stunt backfired somewhat when one week later a mechanical fault in the aircraft caused Locatelli to make a forced landing behind enemy lines and be taken prisoner). Despite all this, the air force ordered another 100 machines, all of which were delivered before the end of the war. At the time of the Armistice, 186 were operational, of which 47 aircraft were ordered to remain on hand with training squadrons, and the remainder were to be put into storage.

=== In Polish service ===
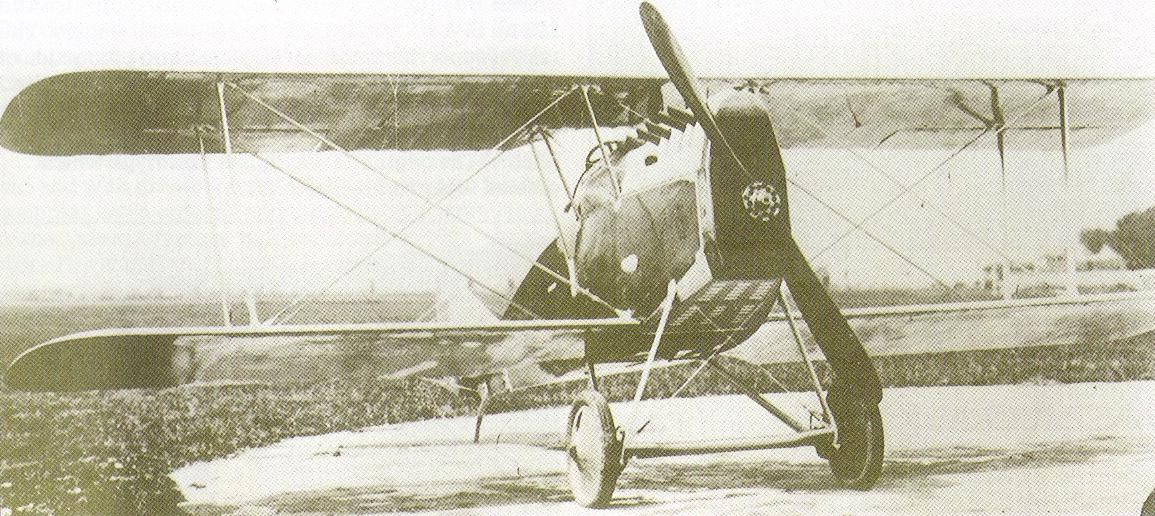
Ansaldo A.1 Balilla

The A.1 found a new lease of life, however, when a purchasing committee from the Polish army visited Italy in 1919 in search of new weapons. A contract for ten evaluation aircraft was signed, and these were delivered to Warsaw in January 1920. They saw extensive use with the Kościuszko Squadron in the Polish-Soviet War of 1919–1921. The initial impression of pilots during the conflict (mostly American volunteers) was extremely favourable, on account of its high speed and fuel capacity and, curiously, the maneuverability disdained by Italian airmen. On May 25, the A.1s were deployed to the front line. All but one of them were destroyed during the Red Army counterattack in Ukraine. Nevertheless, the Polish government had already purchased another 25 aircraft and a licence to locally produce another 100. The new aircraft only arrived after hostilities had ended, and in July 1921 the first of 36 licence-built machines rolled out of the Lublin factory.

The Lublin-built machines were some 80 kg (180 lb) heavier than the original Italian design and exhibited frequent problems with their engines and with the quality of their welds. Numerous accidents ensued, including at least nine fatal crashes. In 1924, the production order was reduced to 80 machines, and soon thereafter to 57 (the number actually constructed at the time). The following year, the armament was removed from all A.1s then in service, and by 1927, the type had been withdrawn from service completely.

=== In Soviet service ===
The new Soviet government carried through with the previous Imperial Russian government's order of Ansaldo aircraft from Italy, and a total of 30 Ansaldo A.1s were delivered between 1918 and 1920. In 1918 the 20th Military Air Fleet of Soviet Russia was equipped mainly with foreign aircraft, including the Ansaldo A.1 equipped with a SPA 6A 220 hp engine. At the beginning of 1922 the A.1 was used by the West Military District of the Kharkiv region (2nd Fighter Squadron of the 2nd Regiment); the Air Forces of the Black Sea Fleet (2nd Navy Fighter Air Detachment), and the Air Forces of the Baltic Sea Fleet (1st and 2nd Fighter Air Detachments). The Russians, anxious to save money, planned to manufacture their own Synchronised machineguns for the aircraft, but failed to produce these themselves, and as a consequence the A.1s were flown unarmed.

The Ansaldo A.1 was popular among Soviet pilots because of its maneuverability and easy handling, although problems with the engines and other defects emerged over time. Skis were fitted to some aircraft for use in winter. By 1928 the A.1s were obsolete and were used only for pilot training

=== In Latvian service ===
In 1921, Latvia became another buyer, ordering 13 aircraft even though the demonstration flight in Riga ended in a fatal crash for Ansaldo's test pilot. The Latvian machines differed from other examples by the addition of insulation to protect the engine from the cold.

=== Promotions in the Americas ===
In an attempt to secure post-war markets, Ansaldo undertook a number of promotional activities in both North and South America. The firm sent six aircraft to the United States in 1919 in an attempt to attract private buyers - at $US 6,000 apiece. The aircraft's high speed proved attractive to record-hunters; US aviation ace Eddie Rickenbacker set a national airspeed record in one in 1920, and one was flown with a Curtiss D-12 engine to third place in the 1921 US Pulitzer air race.

Four aircraft were flown on tour to Argentina and then to Uruguay in an attempt to interest the respective governments in the type, Ansaldo even offering each country two of the promotional aircraft with its complements. However, no order ensued from either of them. The company then displayed two aircraft in Peru, and one in Honduras, but without any success there either. With the failure of the South American promotional tour to attract any business, Ansaldo abandoned the A.1, and the firm was soon absorbed into Fiat.

Mexico acquired one example in 1920 and served in the Fuerza Aérea Mexicana for few years.

== Operators ==
Argentina

- Army Aviation Service

Belgium

- Belgian Air Force

Kingdom of Italy

- Corpo Aeronautico Militare

Greece

- Royal Hellenic Navy
- Hellenic Naval Air Service

Latvia

- Latvian Air Force

Poland

- Polish Air Force

Soviet Union

- Soviet Air Force

Mexico

- Mexican Air Force

Uruguay

- Uruguayan Air Force

== Specifications (A.1bis) ==
General characteristics

- Crew: one pilot
- Length: 6.84 m (22 ft 5 in)
- Wingspan: 7.68 m (25 ft 2 in)
- Height: 2.53 m (8 ft 4 in)
- Wing area: 21.2 m^{2} (228 sq ft)
- Empty weight: 640 kg (1,410 lb)
- Gross weight: 885 kg (1,950 lb)
- Powerplant: 1 × SPA 6A piston engine , 164 kW (220 hp)

Performance

- Maximum speed: 220 km/h (140 mph, 120 kn)
- Range: 660 km (410 mi, 360 nmi)
- Service ceiling: 5,000 m (16,400 ft)
- Rate of climb: 2.7 m/s (520 ft/min)

Armament

- 2 × synchronised .303 Vickers machine gun

== Sources ==
- Taylor, Michael J. H. (1989). Jane's Encyclopedia of Aviation. London: Studio Editions. p. 62.
