= Merian C. Cooper =

American filmmaker (1893–1973)

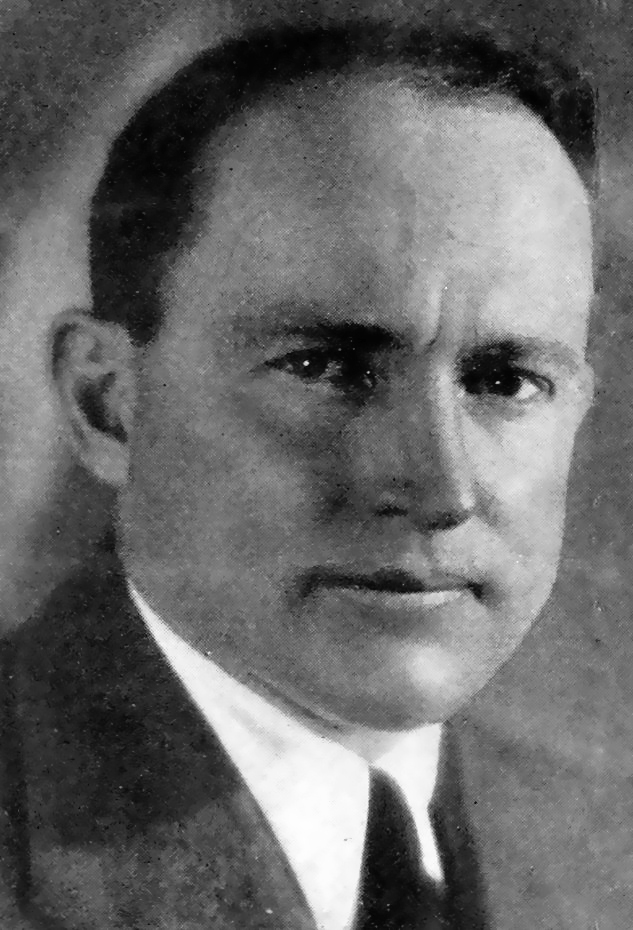
- Cooper in 1927
- Born: Merian Caldwell Cooper; October 24, 1893; Jacksonville, Florida, U.S.
- Died: April 21, 1973 (aged 79); San Diego, California, U.S.
- Education: United States Naval Academy; Georgia Institute of Technology
- Occupations: Film director; film producer; military officer; aviator; actor
- Spouse: Dorothy Jordan (m. 1933)
- Children: 3
- Military career
- Allegiance: United States; Poland
- Branch: United States Army; Polish Air Force
- Service years: 1913–1915; 1916–1919; 1919–1921; 1941–1973
- Rank: Brigadier General (US); Podpułkownik (PL)
- Conflicts: Border War; World War I; Polish-Soviet War; World War II
- Awards: Mexican Border Service Medal; World War I Victory Medal; Asiatic-Pacific Campaign Medal; World War II Victory Medal; Order of Virtuti Militari; Cross of Valour

Merian Caldwell Cooper (October 24, 1893 – April 21, 1973) was an American filmmaker, actor, producer and military aviator. In film, his most famous work was the 1933 movie King Kong, and he is credited as co-inventor of the Cinerama film projection process. He was awarded an honorary Oscar for lifetime achievement in 1952 and received a star on the Hollywood Walk of Fame in 1960. He was a passionate anti-communist.

Before entering the movie business, Cooper fought in World War I as a pilot in the United States Army Air Service and later in the Polish Air Force. He had a distinguished career as the founder of the Kościuszko Squadron during the Polish–Soviet War and was a Soviet prisoner of war for a time. He got his start in film as part of the Explorers Club, traveling the world and documenting adventures. He was a member of the board of directors of Pan American Airways, but his love of film took priority. During his film career, he worked for companies such as Pioneer Pictures, RKO Pictures, and Metro-Goldwyn-Mayer. In 1925, he and Ernest B. Schoedsack went to Iran and made Grass: A Nation's Battle for Life, a documentary about the Bakhtiari people.

== Early life ==
Merian Caldwell Cooper was born in Jacksonville, Florida, to lawyer John C. Cooper and Mary Caldwell. He was the youngest of three children. At age six, Cooper decided that he wanted to be an explorer after hearing stories from the book Explorations and Adventures in Equatorial Africa. He was educated at The Lawrenceville School in New Jersey and graduated in 1911.

After graduation, Cooper received a prestigious appointment to the U.S. Naval Academy, but was expelled during his senior year for "hell raising and for championing air power". In 1916, Cooper worked for the Minneapolis Daily News as a reporter, where he met Delos Lovelace. In the next few years, he also worked at the Des Moines Register-Leader and the St. Louis Post-Dispatch.

== Early military service ==
=== Georgia National Guard ===
In 1916, Cooper joined the Georgia National Guard to help chase Pancho Villa in Mexico. He was called home in March 1917. He worked for the El Paso Herald on a 30-day leave of absence. After returning to his service, Cooper was appointed lieutenant; however, he refused the appointment hoping to participate in combat. Instead, he went to the Military Aeronautics School in Atlanta to learn to fly. Cooper graduated at the top of his class.

=== World War I ===
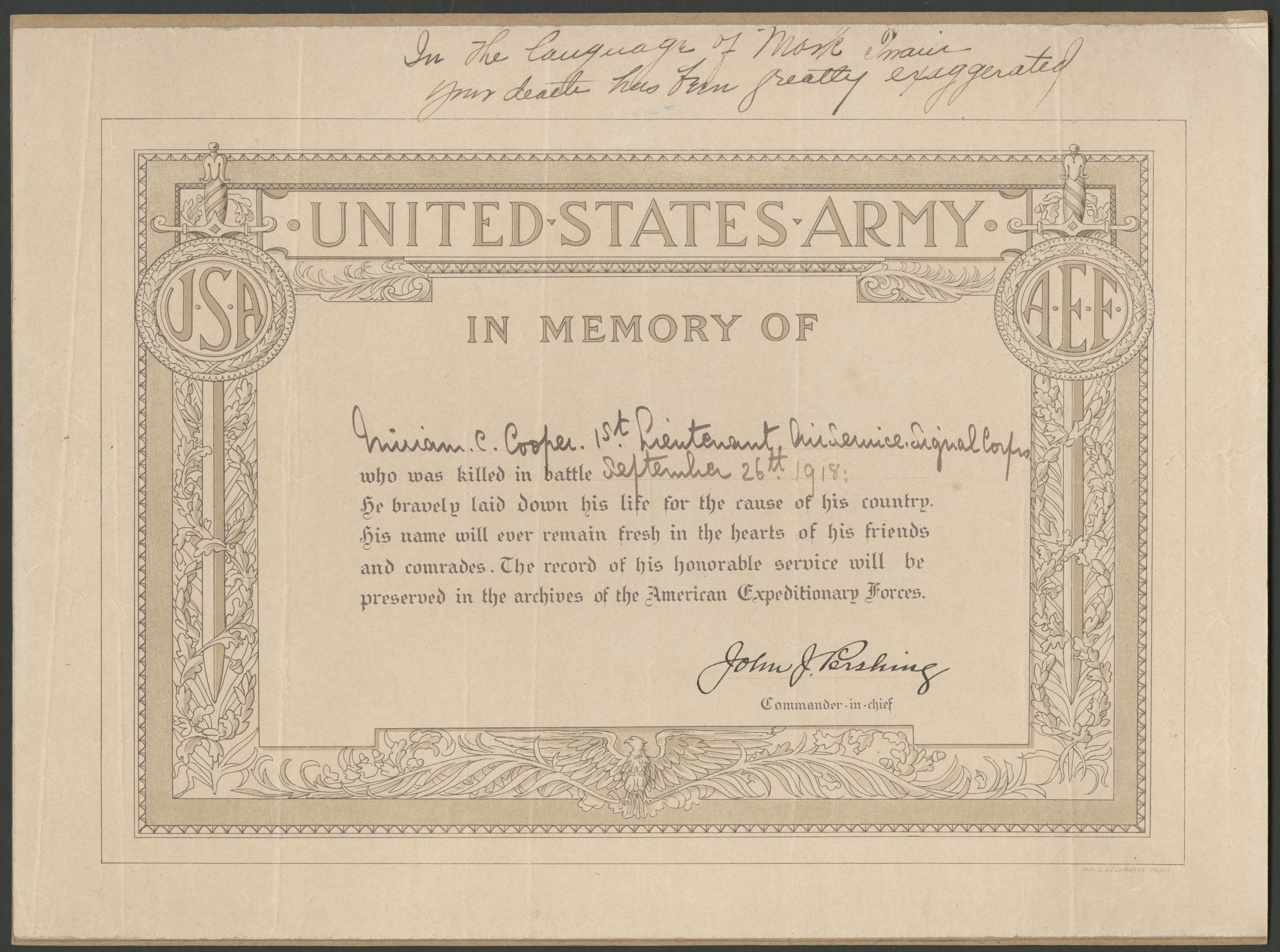
Death statement from when Cooper was presumed dead in 1918

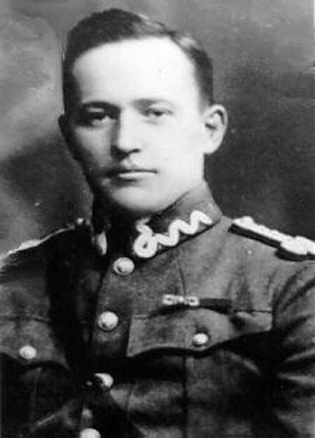
Merian C. Cooper in Polish Air Force uniform

In October 1917, six months after the American entry into World War I, Cooper went to France with the 201st Squadron. He attended flying school in Issoudun. While flying with his friend, Cooper hit his head and was knocked out during a 200-foot plunge. After the incident, Cooper suffered from shock and had to relearn how to fly. Cooper requested to go to Clermont-Ferrand to be trained as a bomber pilot. He became a pilot with the 20th Aero Squadron (which later became the 1st Day Bombardment Group).

Cooper served as a DH-4 bomber pilot with the United States Army Air Service during World War I. On September 26, 1918, his plane was shot down. The plane caught fire, and Cooper spun the plane to suck the flames out. Cooper survived, although he suffered burns, injured his hands, and was presumed dead. German soldiers saw his plane landing and took him to a prisoner reserve hospital. The death certificate on this page was sent to Cooper's family. The Army had believed him killed but he was captured by the Germans and taken as a Prisoner of war (POW). Cooper's father received a letter from Merian around the time the death certificate arrived. Merian C. Cooper sent the copy back to the Army with the notation on top "In the language of Mark Twain Your death has been greatly exaggerated."

Captain Cooper remained in the Air Service after the war; he helped with Herbert Hoover's U.S. Food Administration that provided aid to Poland. He later became the chief of the Poland division. In the early spring of 1919, while supplying the besieged Poles in Lviv during the Polish–Ukrainian War, he claimed to have first discussed US air support for the Polish eastern flank with General Tadeusz Rozwadowski who commanded the city's defence.

=== Kościuszko Squadron ===
The contract for the formation of a volunteer American flight squadron was signed by Rozwadowski, Cooper and Major Cedric Fauntleroy at the Wagram Hotel in Paris on August 26, 1919. On his arrival in Poland, Cooper met with cold reception from the Chief of State Józef Piłsudski, who considered the Americans "paid mercenaries". They were nonetheless dispatched to Lviv in October 1919 and drafted into the Polish military as the Kościuszko Squadron in December. Cooper then provided air combat support for the Polish Army in the Polish–Soviet War. On July 13, 1920, his plane was shot down, and he spent nearly nine months in a Soviet prisoner of war camp where the writer Isaac Babel interviewed him. He escaped just before the war was over and made it to Latvia. For his valor he was decorated by Polish commander-in-chief Józef Piłsudski with the highest Polish military decoration, the Virtuti Militari.

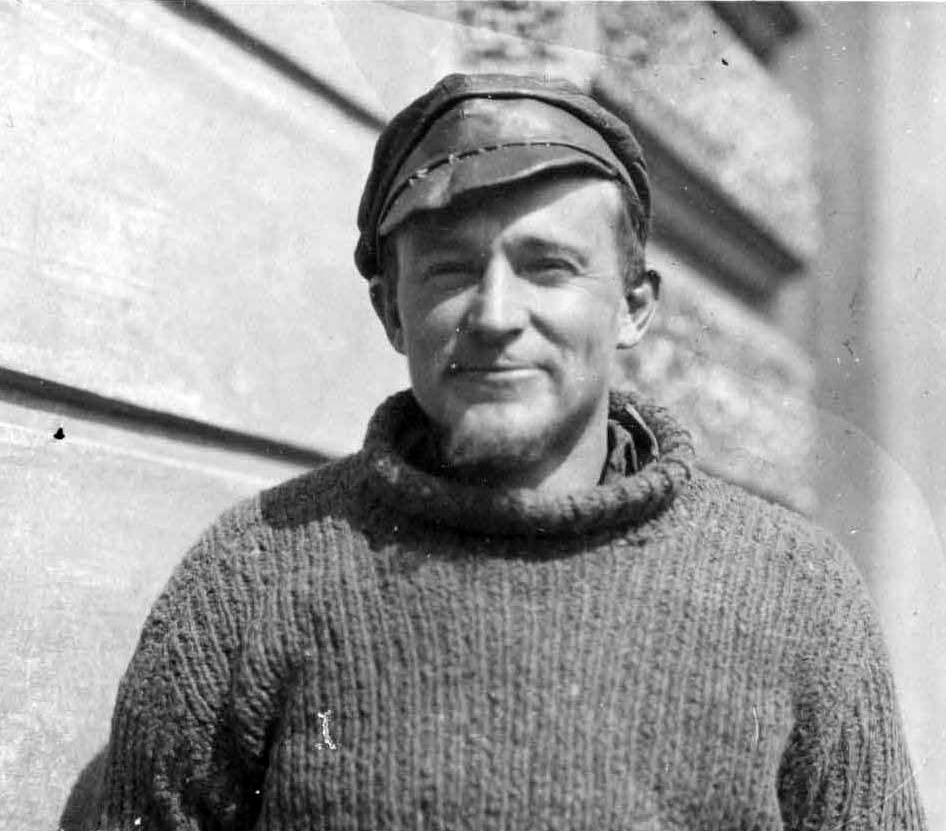
Cooper at the Latvian border after escaping the Soviet POW camp

During his time as a POW, Cooper wrote an autobiography: Things Men Die For. The manuscript was published by G. P. Putnam's Sons in New York (the Knickerbocker Press) in 1927. However, in 1928, Cooper regretted releasing certain details about "Nina" (probably Marjorie Crosby-Słomczyńska) with whom he had relations outside of wedlock. Cooper asked Dagmar Matson, who had the manuscript, to buy all the copies of the book possible. Matson found almost all 5,000 copies that had been printed. The books were destroyed, while Cooper and Matson each kept a copy.

An interbellum Polish film directed by Leonard Buczkowski, Gwiaździsta eskadra (The Starry Squadron), was inspired by Cooper's experiences as a Polish Air Force officer. The film was made with the cooperation of the Polish army and was the most expensive Polish film prior to World War II. After World War II, all copies of the film found in Poland were destroyed by the Soviets.

== Career ==
=== Cooper and Schoedsack ===
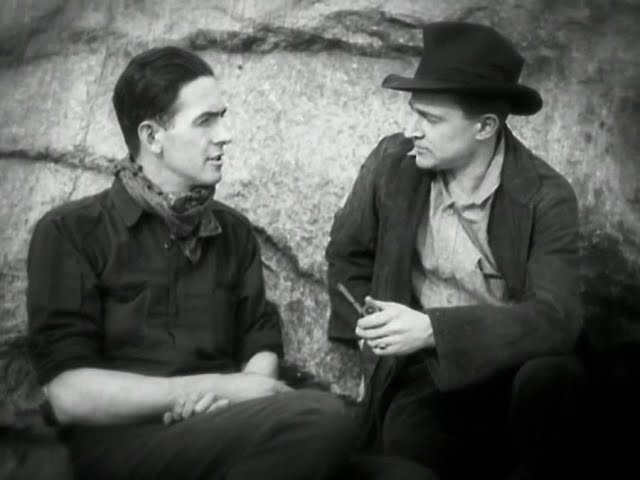
Cooper (right) alongside Ernest Schoedsack in a scene from Grass (1925).

After returning from overseas in 1921, Cooper got a job working the night shift at The New York Times. He was commissioned to write articles for Asia magazine. Cooper was able to travel with Ernest Schoedsack on a sea voyage on the Wisdom II. As part of the journey, he traveled to Abyssinia, or the Ethiopian Empire, where he met their prince regent, Ras Tefari, later known as Emperor Haile Selassie I. The ship left Abyssinia in February 1923. On their way home, the crew narrowly missed being attacked by pirates, and the ship was burned down. His three-part series for Asia was published in 1923.

After returning home, Cooper researched for the American Geographical Society. In 1924, Cooper joined Schoedsack and Marguerite Harrison who had embarked on an expedition that would be turned into the film Grass (1925). They returned later the same year. Cooper became a member of the Explorers Club of New York in January 1925 and was asked to give lectures and attend events due to his extensive traveling. Grass was acquired by Paramount Pictures. Cooper and Schoedsack's first film gained the attention of Jesse Lasky, who commissioned the duo for their second film, Chang (1927). They also produced the film The Four Feathers, which was filmed among the fighting tribes of the Sudan. These films combined real footage with staged sequences.

=== Pan American Airways ===
From 1926 to 1927, Cooper discussed with John Hambleton the plans for Pan American Airways, which was formed in 1927. Cooper was a member of the board of directors of Pan American Airways. During his tenure at Pan Am, the company established the first regularly scheduled transatlantic service. While he was on the board, Cooper did not devote his full attention to the organization; he took time in 1929 and 1930 to work on the script for King Kong. By 1931, he was back in Hollywood. He resigned from the board of directors in 1935, following health complications.

=== King Kong ===
Cooper said that he thought of King Kong after he had a dream that a giant gorilla was terrorizing New York City. When he awoke, he recorded the idea and used it for the film. He was going to have a giant gorilla fight a Komodo dragon or other animal, but found that the technique of interlacing that he wanted to use would not provide realistic results.

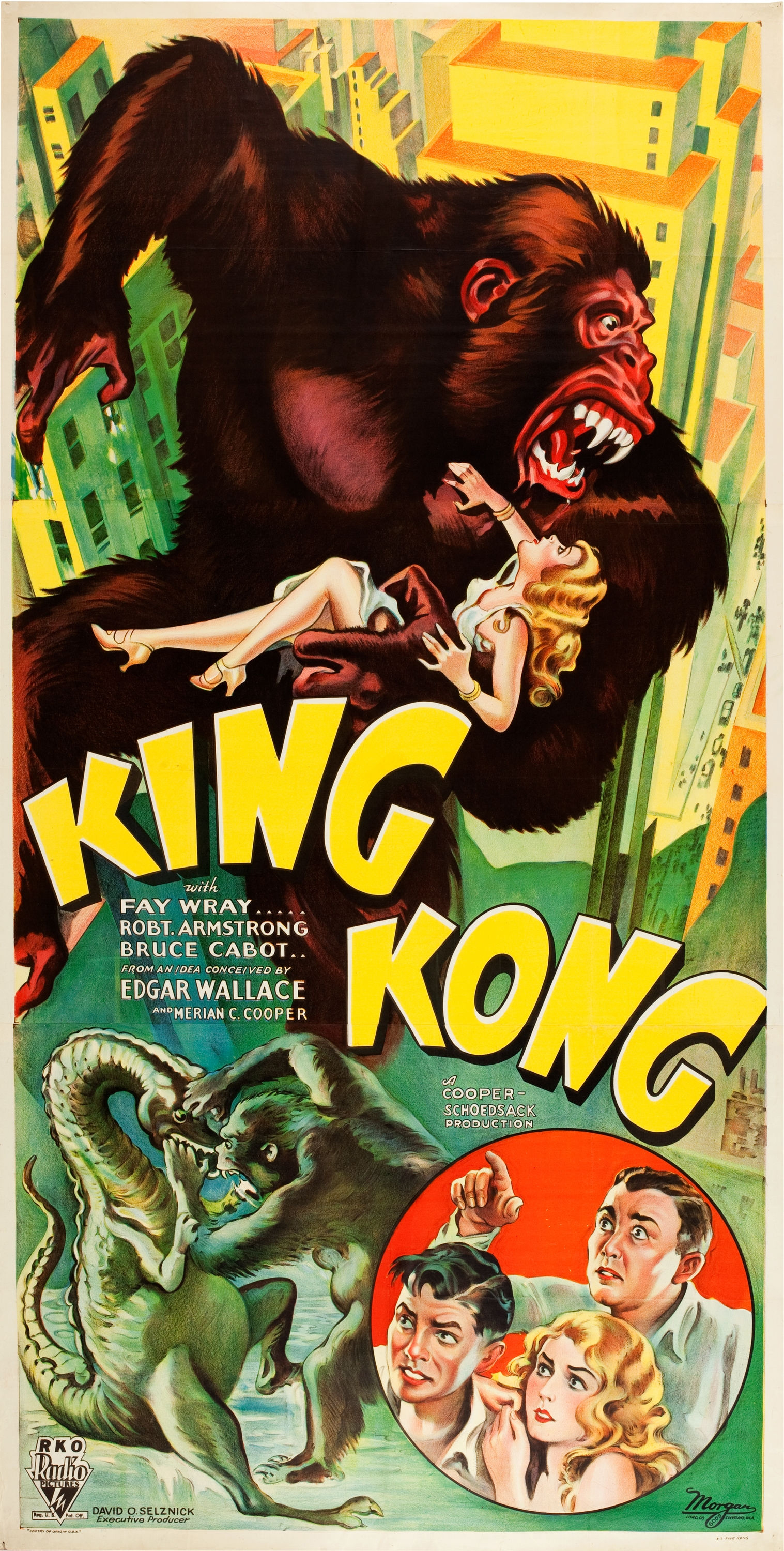
King Kong movie poster

Cooper needed a production studio for the film, but recognized the great cost of the movie, especially during the Great Depression. Cooper helped David Selznick get a job at RKO Pictures, which was struggling financially. Selznick became the vice president of RKO and asked Cooper to join him in September 1931, although he had only produced three films thus far in his career. Cooper began working as an executive assistant at age thirty-eight. He officially pitched the idea for King Kong in December 1931. Shortly after, he began to seek actors and build full-scale sets, although the screenplay was not yet complete.

The screenplay was delivered to Cooper in January 1932. Schoedsack contributed to the film, focusing on shooting scenes for the boat sequences and in native villages, leaving Cooper to shoot the jungle scenes. In February 1933, the title for the film was registered for copyright. Throughout filming there were creative battles. Critics at RKO argued that the film should begin with Kong. Cooper believed that a film should begin with a "slow dramatic buildup that would establish everything from characters to mood ..." so that the action of the film could "naturally, relentlessly, roll on out of its own creative movement", and thus chose not to begin the film with a shot of Kong.

The iconic scene in which Kong climbs to the top of the Empire State Building was almost cut by Cooper due to legal concerns over a similar sequence in The Lost World (1925). RKO's purchase of the rights to The Lost World neutralized the legal risk, allowing the sequence to remain in the film.

Overlapping with the production of King Kong was the making of The Most Dangerous Game, which began in May 1932. Cooper once again worked with Schoedsack to produce the film.

In the 1933 version of King Kong, Cooper and co-director Ernest B. Schoedsack appear at the end, piloting the plane that finally finishes off Kong. Cooper had reportedly said, "We should kill the sonofabitch ourselves." Cooper personally cut a scene in King Kong in which four sailors are shaken off a tree trunk bridge by Kong, fall into a ravine, and are eaten alive by giant spiders. According to Hollywood folklore, the decision was made after previews in January 1933, during which audience members either fled the theater in terror or talked about the ghastly scene throughout the remainder of the movie. However, more objective sources maintain that the scene merely slowed the film's pace. Despite the rumor that Cooper kept a print of the cut footage as a memento, it has never been found. In 2021, film historian Ray Morton stated in an interview that, after looking through the films shooting schedule, he found no evidence the sequence was ever filmed.

In 1963, Cooper argued unsuccessfully that he should own the rights to King Kong; later in 1976, judges ruled that Cooper's estate owned the rights to King Kong outside the movie and its sequel. Selznick left RKO before the release of King Kong, and Cooper served as production chief from 1933 to 1934 with Pandro S. Berman as his executive assistant.

In the 2005 remake of King Kong, upon learning that Fay Wray was not available because she was making a film at RKO, Carl Denham (Jack Black) replies, "Cooper, huh? I might have known."

=== Pioneer Pictures, Selznick International Pictures, and Metro-Goldwyn-Mayer ===
Cooper helped the Whitney cousins form Pioneer Pictures in 1933, while he was still working for RKO. He was named vice president in charge of production for Pioneer Pictures in 1934. He would use Pioneer Pictures to test his technicolor innovations. The company contracted with RKO in order to fulfill Cooper's obligations to the company, including She and The Last Days of Pompeii. Cooper later referred to She as the "worst picture I ever made."

After these disappointments, Pioneer Pictures released a short film in three-strip technicolor called La Cucaracha, which was well received. The film won an Academy Award in 1934. Pioneer released the first full-length technicolor film, Becky Sharp in 1935. Cooper helped to advocate and pave the way for the ground-breaking technology of technicolor, as well as the widescreen process called Cinerama.

Selznick formed Selznick International Pictures in 1935, and Pioneer Pictures merged with it in June 1936. Cooper became the vice president of Selznick International Pictures that same year. Cooper did not stay long; he resigned in 1937 due to disagreements over the film Stagecoach.

After resigning from Selznick International, Cooper went to Metro-Goldwyn-Mayer (MGM) in June 1937. A noteworthy project that Cooper was involved in was the fantasy film War Eagles. The film, which would have used extensive special effects, was abandoned in approximately 1939 and never finished. Cooper was to return to the Army Air Force.

=== World War II ===
Cooper re-enlisted and was commissioned a colonel in the U.S. Army Air Forces. He served with Col. Robert L. Scott in India. He worked as logistics liaison for the Doolittle Raid. Thereafter, Cooper and Scott worked with Col. Caleb V. Haynes at Dinjan Airfield. They all were involved in establishing the Assam-Burma-China Ferrying Command. This marked the beginnings of The Hump Airlift.

Colonel Cooper later served in China as chief of staff for General Claire Chennault of the China Air Task Force, which was the precursor of the Fourteenth Air Force. On October 25, 1942, a CATF raid consisting of 12 B-25s and 7 P-40s, led by Colonel Cooper, successfully bombed the Kowloon Docks at Hong Kong.

He served from 1943 to 1945 in the Southwest Pacific as chief of staff for the Fifth Air Force's Bomber Command. At the end of the war, he was promoted to brigadier general. For his contributions, he was also aboard the USS Missouri to witness Japan's surrender.

=== Argosy Pictures and Cinerama ===
Cooper and his friend and frequent collaborator, noted director John Ford, formed Argosy Productions in 1946 and produced such notable films as Wagon Master (1950), Ford's Fort Apache (1948), and She Wore a Yellow Ribbon (1949). Cooper's films at Argosy reflected his patriotism and his vision of the United States.

Argosy negotiated a contract with RKO in 1946 to make four pictures. Cooper was able to make Grass a complete picture. Cooper also produced and directed Mighty Joe Young, which recruited Schoedsack as director. Cooper visited the set of the film every day to check on progress.

Cooper left Argosy Pictures to pursue the process of Cinerama. He became the vice president of Cinerama Productions in the 1950s and was also elected a board member. After failing to convince other board members to finance skilled technicians, Cooper left Cinerama with Cornelius Vanderbilt Whitney to form C. V. Whitney Productions. Cooper continued to outline movies to be shot in Cinerama, but C. V. Whitney Productions only produced a few films. Cooper was the executive producer for Ford's The Searchers (1956).

== Politics and business ventures ==
In the 1950s, Cooper supported Joseph McCarthy in his crusade to root out Communists in Hollywood and Washington, D.C.

He backed Barry Goldwater in the 1964 United States presidential election.

Cooper founded Advanced Projects Corporation (1966–1972), a technology venture focused on developing 3D color television, whose mission he described as "revolutionizing both theatrical productions and exhibition as well as television". He served as the chairman of its board and enlisted Charles B. Fitzsimons as president, inventor Wadsworth E. Pohl as vice president, Kathy Ryan as executive secretary, and his own son Richard, General John R. Alison (an old comrade from China), William Douglas Burden, Thomas Corcoran and lawyer Earl S. Wright as directors. The company won the contract to build and operate the Ozark Folk Center and started the construction of its facility in 1971 before running out of funds and leasing the site to the Arkansas Department of Parks and Tourism in May 1972.

== Awards ==
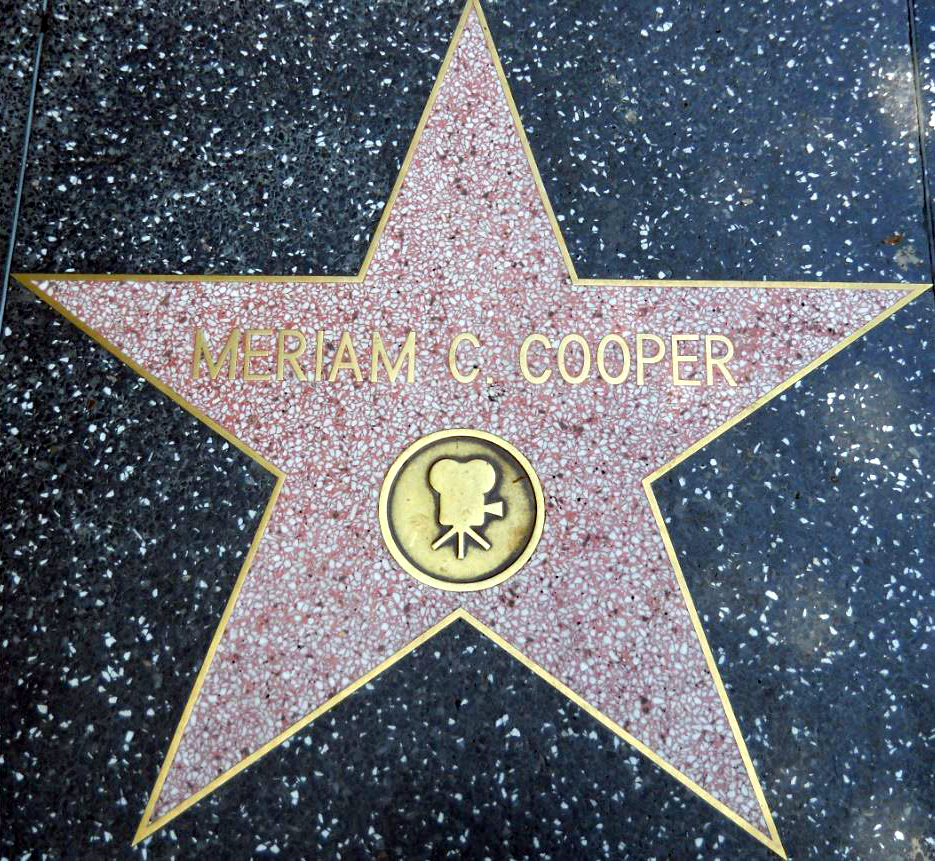
Star on Hollywood Walk of Fame, at 6525 Hollywood Blvd., with first name misspelled

For his military service in Poland, Cooper was awarded the Silver Cross of the Order of Virtuti Militari (presented by Piłsudski), and Poland's Cross of Valour.

In 1927, Cooper was one of 19 prominent Americans who were given the title of "Honorary Scouts" by the Boy Scouts of America for "... achievements in outdoor activity, exploration and worthwhile adventure ... of such an exceptional character as to capture the imagination of boys". The other honorees were Roy Chapman Andrews, Robert Bartlett, Frederick Russell Burnham, Richard E. Byrd, George Kruck Cherrie, James L. Clark, Lincoln Ellsworth, Louis Agassiz Fuertes, George Bird Grinnell, Charles Lindbergh, Donald Baxter MacMillan, Clifford H. Pope, George Palmer Putnam, Kermit Roosevelt, Carl Rungius, Stewart Edward White, and Orville Wright.

In 1949, Mighty Joe Young won an Academy Award for Best Visual Effects, which was presented to Willis O'Brien, the man responsible for the film's special effects.

Cooper was awarded an honorary Oscar for lifetime achievement in 1952. His film The Quiet Man was nominated for Best Picture that year, but lost to Cecil B. DeMille's The Greatest Show on Earth. Cooper has a star on the Hollywood Walk of Fame, though his first name is misspelled "Meriam".

== Personal life ==
Cooper was the father of Polish translator and writer Maciej Słomczyński. He married film actress Dorothy Jordan on May 27, 1933. They kept their marriage a secret from Hollywood for a month before it was reported by journalists. He suffered a heart attack later that year.

== Death ==
Cooper died of cancer on April 21, 1973, in San Diego. His ashes were scattered at sea with full military honors. He and King Kong's lead actor Robert Armstrong, died within sixteen hours of each other.

== Filmography ==
Year	Title	Director	Producer	Writer	Cinematographer	Notes
1924	The Lost Empire	No	No	Titles	No	Also editor
1925	Grass: A Nation's Battle for Life	Yes	Yes	No	Yes	Role: Himself; Documentary
1927	Chang: A Drama of the Wilderness	Yes	Yes	Yes	No	Documentaries
1929	Captain Salisbury's Ra-Mu	No	No	No	Yes	Documentaries
1929	The Four Feathers	Yes	Yes	No	Yes	
1931	Gow the Killer	No	No	No	Yes	Documentary-based exploitation film
1932	Roar of the Dragon	No	No	Story	No	
1933	King Kong	Yes	Yes	Story	No	Role: Pilot of plane that kills Kong
1935	The Last Days of Pompeii	Yes	Yes	No	No	
1949	Mighty Joe Young	Yes	Yes	Story	No	Also presenter
1952	This Is Cinerama	Yes	Yes	No	No	Documentary

Only Producer
Year	Title	Producing role	Notes
1932	The Most Dangerous Game	Associate producer	
1932	Flaming Gold	Executive producer	
1932	The Phantom of Crestwood	Associate producer	
1933	The Monkey's Paw	Producer	
1933	Lucky Devils	Associate producer	
1933	Diplomaniacs	Executive producer	
1933	The Silver Cord	Executive producer	
1933	Emergency Call	Executive producer	
1933	Cross Fire	Executive producer	
1933	Professional Sweetheart	Executive producer	
1933	Melody Cruise	Executive producer	
1933	Bed of Roses	Executive producer	
1933	Flying Devils	Executive producer	
1933	Double Harness	Executive producer	
1933	Headline Shooter	Executive producer	
1933	Before Dawn	Executive producer	
1933	No Marriage Ties	Executive producer	
1933	Morning Glory	Executive producer	
1933	Blind Adventure	Executive producer	
1933	One Man's Journey	Executive producer	
1933	Rafter Romance	Executive producer	
1933	Midshipman Jack	Executive producer	
1933	Ann Vickers	Executive producer	
1933	Aggie Appleby, Maker of Men	Executive producer	
1933	Ace of Aces	Executive producer	
1933	After Tonight	Executive producer	
1933	Chance at Heaven	Executive producer	
1933	Little Women	Executive producer	
1933	The Right to Romance	Executive producer	
1933	If I Were Free	Executive producer	
1933	The Son of Kong	Executive producer	Also characters
1933	Flying Down to Rio	Executive producer	
1934	Stingaree	Presenter	
1934	The Meanest Gal in Town	Executive producer	
1934	Man of Two Worlds	Executive producer	
1934	Long Lost Father	Executive producer	
1934	Two Alone	Executive producer	
1934	Hips, Hips, Hooray!	Executive producer	
1934	The Lost Patrol	Executive producer	
1934	Keep 'Em Rolling	Executive producer	
1934	Spitfire	Executive producer	
1934	Success at Any Price	Executive producer	
1934	This Man Is Mine	Executive producer	
1934	Sing and Like It	Executive producer	
1934	Finishing School	Executive producer	
1934	Kentucky Kernels	Executive producer	
1935	She	Producer	
1936	Dancing Pirate	Executive producer	
1938	The Toy Wife	Producer	
1940	Dr. Cyclops	Producer	
1947	The Fugitive	Presenter, producer	
1948	Fort Apache	Presenter, executive producer	
1948	3 Godfathers	Presenter, producer	
1949	She Wore a Yellow Ribbon	Presenter, executive producer	
1950	Wagon Master	Presenter, executive producer	
1950	Rio Grande	Producer	
1952	The Quiet Man	Producer	
1953	The Sun Shines Bright	Producer	
1956	The Searchers	Executive producer	
1956	Seven Wonders of the World	Producer	Documentary
1963	Best of Cinerama	Producer	Documentary

== Bibliography ==
- Cooper, Merian C. (February 1928). "The Warfare of the Jungle Folk: Campaigning Against Tigers, Elephants, and Other Wild Animals in Northern Siam". National Geographic: 233–68.
- Cisek, Janusz (2002). Kosciuszko, We Are Here!. McFarland. ISBN 9780786412402. OCLC 49871871.
- I'm King Kong!—The Exploits of Merian C. Cooper (2005), TCM documentary on Cooper, directed by Kevin Brownlow.
