= The Small Rain =

Book by Madeleine L'Engle

- First edition
- Author: Madeleine L'Engle
- Language: English
- Series: Katherine Forrester
- Genre: Bildungsroman (coming of age novel)
- Publisher: Vanguard Press (1945); Farrar, Straus & Giroux (1984)
- Publication date: 1945
- Publication place: United States
- Media type: Print (hardback & paperback)
- Pages: 371 pp
- ISBN: 0-374-26637-9
- OCLC: 10932055
- Dewey Decimal: 813/.54 19
- LC Class: PS3523.E55 S5 1984
- Followed by: A Severed Wasp

The Small Rain is a semi-autobiographical novel by Madeleine L'Engle, about the many difficulties in the life of talented pianist Katherine Forrester between the ages of 10 and 19. Published in 1945 by the Vanguard Press, it was the first of L'Engle's long list of books, and was reprinted in 1984. L'Engle began work on it in college, and completed it while an actress in New York.

An adaptation of the first part of The Small Rain for young people was also published by the Vanguard Press in 1968, entitled Prelude.

== Plot summary ==
Young Katherine Forrester has not seen her mother Julie in three years, since the latter was in an accident that ended her career as a pianist. Katherine has been studying piano herself, doing a little professional acting, and living with "Aunt Manya", a family friend known to the rest of the world as Madame Sergeivna, a famous actress on the Broadway stage. When she is ten, Katherine is reunited with Julie, and lives with her until Julie's premature death four years later.

Manya marries Katherine's father, a composer named Tom Forrester, with whom Katherine has a cordial but not especially close relationship, making Katherine doubly distant from the two of them. However, after a while, Manya's love for her begins to melt Katherine's iciness. However, just as Katherine starts truly loving Manya, Tom and Manya send her away to a boarding school in Switzerland. She is miserable there, unable to make connections with the other girls or the teachers, who are mostly cold and autocratic; in addition, her piano teacher doesn't mesh with her at all. This continues until Justin Vigneras, the piano teacher she was originally meant to study with but who was away at the beginning of the term, comes back. Katherine adores him, and is gratified that there is finally someone at school who understands and supports her passion for music and her need to practice. She also learns to get along better with her peers after the arrival of Sarah Courmont, a girl she previously met briefly on her seventh birthday in New York; the two begin to form an intense friendship. However, school officials misinterpret that friendship as another deep attraction, and Sarah becomes distant with Katherine after Miss Valentine interrogates the girls. Just as Katherine's relationship with Justin begins to develop into a closer relationship, he leaves the school.

After suffering through the rest of school without Justin or the Sarah she once knew and a brief romance with Charles Bejart, a young physician and Manya's adopted son, Katherine returns to New York. There she studies with her mother's old teacher, whose style is extremely intense and different from Justin's, shares an apartment with Sarah, who is now an actress, and becomes engaged to Pete, who used to help look after Katherine at Manya's theater. She also meets Sarah's friend Felix Bodeway, though she's not often comfortable with the shady, questionable world that he seems to represent. Ultimately Katherine is betrayed by both Pete and Sarah, as Pete and Sarah become romantically involved with each other. Katherine leaves them behind and, upon Manya's urging, returns to Justin, ostensibly to study with him in Paris.

== Major characters ==
- Katherine Forrester — Pianist. In The Small Rain, Katherine Forrester is a gifted but socially isolated adolescent studying to be a concert pianist at a strict boarding school, who falls in love with her piano teacher, Justin Vigneras. She later continues her studies in New York City and is briefly engaged to Pete Burns.
- Manya Sergeievna — Actress. Called "Aunt Manya" by Katherine, "Madame Sergeievna" by everyone else, Manya is a highly respected, larger-than-life actress and close friend of Julie Forrester, Katherine's mother. After Julie's accident, Manya takes care of Katherine, but reunites the mother and child at the beginning of the novel. After Julie dies, Manya marries Katherine's father, composer Thomas Forrester.
- Justin Vigneras — Pianist, teacher and composer. Katherine first meets Justin when he returns to her boarding school as a teacher, and mentors her as his favorite student. Katherine, in turn, falls in love with him. Keenly aware of the age difference between them, Justin soon leaves Katherine and the school behind, but their professional and romantic relationship is rekindled at the end of the novel as Katherine enters adulthood.
- Sarah Courtmont — Actress. Sarah first meets Katherine briefly in a park when both are young children. They meet again at the boarding school and form a close, intense friendship that is destroyed when the school's staff suspect the relationship may have a sexual component. They meet a third time in New York City and become roommates, until Sarah betrays Katherine by stealing her fiance, Pete Burns.
- Pete Burns — Actor. Early on the novel, Pete acts as a protective "big brother" figure for the child Katherine, looking after her as she attends Manya's plays or appears on stage herself. After Katherine returns to New York, the relationship blossoms into a romantic one, and they become engaged. Ultimately, Pete leaves Katherine for Sarah.
- Felix Bodeway — Violinist (at the time of A Small Rain). Felix first encounters Katherine in New York City when Katherine has finished school and has Sarah Courtmont for a roommate. Felix is Sarah's boyfriend of sorts, a bohemian would-be violinist with aspirations to be a "window cleaner" — that is, to help people see beyond themselves. Katherine sees him as a "lightweight" (although she finds him much changed when she encounters him again fifty years later in the sequel, A Severed Wasp).

== Context ==
In her introduction to the 1984 edition of The Small Rain, Madeleine L'Engle mentions a number of similarities between Katherine's early life and her own. Both lived in New York and worked in the theater, but had aspirations in another field of artistic endeavor. L'Engle says that Katherine "approached her work with the same determination and single-mindedness with which I approached mine." Both had mothers who played the piano, and both lost a parent while in their teens, although with L'Engle it was her father. Both had a slight limp from one leg being slightly shorter than the other. Both attended boarding school in Switzerland, where they were "lonely and unhappy." Both wrote to their families at a classmate's suggestion, asking to come home, but to no avail. Nevertheless, L'Engle states that "The deeper I got into the novel, the more Katherine became Katherine and the less Madeleine. But we are sisters, there's no doubt about that."

Some of these same elements reappear in other early novels by L'Engle. Philippa "Flip" Hunter, the protagonist of And Both Were Young (1949) is another aspiring artist who attends a boarding school in Switzerland, initially fails to get on well with peers, and has trouble with an athletics instructor over a leg problem caused by a past injury. Virginia ("Vee") Bowen, the daughter of the protagonist of A Winter's Love (1957), attends a similar school and is a future writer. However, Vee's problems, such as they are, stem from difficulties at home rather than at school.

== Prelude and subsequent editions ==
Cover of the 1968 young adult novel Prelude

In 1968, The Vanguard Press issued the L'Engle novel Prelude (LC 68-56600). The indicia page notes the book's provenance: "This book has been especially adapted for young people by the author from the first part of her novel, The Small Rain." Dedicated to L'Engle's father, Charles Wadsworth Camp (as is The Small Rain), Prelude covers the events of Katherine's life until Justin leaves the boarding school. The ending of Prelude is slightly more upbeat than the corresponding text in The Small Rain, with mutual promises that they will see each other again. By contrast, the same scene in The Small Rain ends with the words, "She...sat there until she saw Justin leave the studio, carrying the music he hadn't already packed, walking happily, he head held high and proud, out of her life." Another major difference is that Prelude omits Justin's drunken advances toward the still-underage Katherine in Paris, shortly before she returns to school without him. The scene in which Miss Valentine interrogates Katherine and Sarah about their friendship (which does not directly mention homosexuality) is left intact.

In 1984, The Small Rain was reissued by Farrar, Straus & Giroux, the publishers of nearly all of Madeleine L'Engle's other novels since A Wrinkle in Time (1962). This current edition, ISBN 0-374-26637-9, features a dust jacket by Sam Salant and a new introduction by L'Engle, in which she mentions the continuation of Katherine's story in her 1982 novel A Severed Wasp.

== Sequel ==
In 1982, L'Engle published a sequel entitled A Severed Wasp, in which Katherine, now an elderly widow known as Katherine Vigneras after her marriage to her piano teacher and mentor Justin Vigneras, looks back on her life while trying to survive and unravel a frightening mystery at the Cathedral of St. John the Divine. The sequel shows that Justin and Katherine married and raise two children, fathered by other men since injuries Justin sustained in World War II left him unable to father children or play the piano professionally. He becomes a composer and manages Katherine's career, and is deceased at the time of A Severed Wasp.

Katherine also renews her acquaintance with Felix Bodeway, who at the time of A Severed Wasp is a retired bishop who has become gentle, compassionate, and afraid through his past suffering. He eventually confesses to having experimented with homosexuality and dissolute behavior as a young man, and it is implied there is an unrequited sexual component to his love for the present bishop, Allie Undercroft.

In A Severed Wasp, Katherine also has a portrait painted by Philippa "Flip" Hunter, protagonist of L'Engle's 1949 novel And Both Were Young.

== Crossover characters ==
Katherine Forrester Vigneras appears very briefly in L'Engle's 1980 novel A Ring of Endless Light, playing a recital that Vicky Austin and Zachary Gray attend.
