= A Ring of Endless Light (film) =

2002 television film directed by Greg Beeman

- Promotional poster
- Based on: A Ring of Endless Light by Madeleine L'Engle
- Written by: Marita Giovanni; Bruce Graham
- Directed by: Greg Beeman
- Starring: Mischa Barton; Ryan Merriman
- Theme music composer: Phil Marshall
- Country of origin: United States
- Original language: English

Production
- Cinematography: Rodney Charters
- Editor: Terry Stokes
- Running time: 88 minutes

Original release
- Network: Disney Channel
- Release: August 23, 2002

A Ring of Endless Light is a 2002 American romantic drama film that was released as a Disney Channel Original Movie. It was based on the Madeleine L'Engle book of the same name filmed on location in Australia, and stars Mischa Barton in the lead role. In the U.S., it was aired on August 23, 2002.

== Plot ==
When 16-year-old Vicky Austin, her sister Suzy and little brother Rob visit their grandfather on Seven Bay Island, Vicky faces several unexpected challenges. Her beloved grandfather, the retired Reverend Eaton, seems to be seriously ill, but tries to pretend that nothing is wrong. Vicky met the rich but emotionally troubled Zachary Gray the previous summer, and he reappears to renew the acquaintance. Another boy, 17-year-old Adam Eddington, recruits Vicky to help him with a research project, working with a dolphin called Basil. Vicky discovers she can communicate telepathically with the dolphin and his mate – and possibly with Adam as well.

Vicky copes as best she can with the increasing stress placed on her by her grandfather's illness, especially once he admits to her that he is dying of leukemia. In turn, Reverend Eaton tries to encourage Vicky with his gentle wisdom and appreciation of her talents, especially her writing, in marked contrast to her parents' long distance expectations that she study science.

A rivalry develops between Zach and Adam, which becomes an uneasy alliance as the three teenagers seek to expose the illegal use of drift nets, which trap and kill dolphins, by a ship owned by Zach's father. Eventually they succeed, saving their dolphin friend (and Adam himself) from the deadly net just as Vicky's grandfather arrives with the Coast Guard. The excitement is too much for Reverend Eaton, however, who dies soon afterward. He leaves behind a new blank book for Vicky in which to write her poetry. Vicky decides to follow her heart and her talents rather than her parents' plans for her.

== Cast ==
- Mischa Barton as Vicky Austin
- Ryan Merriman as Adam Eddington
- Jared Padalecki as Zachary Gray
- Scarlett Pomers as Suzy Austin
- Soren Fulton as Rob Austin
- James Whitmore as Grandfather
- Theresa Wong as Dr. Zand
- Penny Everingham as Cecily
- Christopher Kirby as Harbour Master Dan
- Steven Vidler as Mr Gray

== Comparison with the novel ==
The television adaptation is considerably "lighter" in tone than the novel A Ring of Endless Light. In the book, a family friend has just died while trying to save the life of Vicky's troubled friend Zachary Gray. Shortly thereafter, a baby dolphin dies, a marine biologist of Vicky's acquaintance is nearly killed in an accident, and a sick girl suffers a seizure and dies in Vicky's arms. In the film, Vicky's grandfather is dying and some dolphins are threatened by illegal fishing nets, but that is about the extent of the death and impending death Vicky sees around her. The fishing nets storyline, which does not appear in the novel, is standard Disney fare in that it involves young characters behaving heroically in an adventure setting. Its climax, in which one of the major characters is tangled in a net and nearly drowns, echoes a similar scene in the Disney Channel movie The Thirteenth Year.

Vicky's on-screen love life is also substantially different from what appears in the book. In the film, Zachary does not try to commit suicide, and his negative behavior has been toned down. Instead the film shows Zach involved in positive activities, most notably joining forces with Adam to expose the illegal fishing methods. In the book, the character Leo Rodney competes with Zachary Gray for Vicky's attention, while Adam tries to avoid forming a romantic attachment with her because of a negative experience the previous summer. In the film, Adam and Zachary are rivals, and Leo does not appear.

Family relationships in the film have been similarly changed and streamlined. Vicky's parents are absent for most of the film, whereas they are very much present in the novel. In the film, Vicky's parents expect her to study science, while in the book, they encourage Vicky to choose her own path. Vicky's older brother John is not mentioned, and his interest in astronomy is given to Suzy instead. In the novel, Vicky's grandfather is completely honest about his illness and from the beginning, Vicky understands that her grandfather will not be alive at the end of the summer. In the film the extent and nature of his illness is a secret that is only gradually revealed.

== Reception ==
Laura Fries of Variety reviewed the film negatively, remarking "Writers Marita Giovanni and Bruce Graham take the poignant and thought-provoking notions of life and death found in the Madeline L’Engle teen novel and turn it into Gidget meets Flipper drivel..." Lynne Heffley of Los Angeles Times was more complimentary, lauding the performances, highlighting "...Mischa Barton's luminous presence as Vicky and the venerable James Whitmore as her tender and wise grandfather."

== Award and nomination ==
The film's director, Greg Beeman, was nominated for the 2002 Directors Guild of America Award for Outstanding Directorial Achievement in Children's Programs for A Ring of Endless Light.
