= Meet the Austins =

1960 novel by Madeleine L'Engle

- dust jacket to the 1960 edition
- Author: Madeleine L'Engle
- Cover artist: unknown (1960 edition)
- Language: English
- Series: Austin family
- Genre: Young Adult
- Publisher: Vanguard Press, Farrar, Straus & Giroux
- Publication date: 1960, revised 1997
- Publication place: United States
- Media type: Print (Hardback)
- Pages: 191 pp (first ed.), 216 (1997 ed.)
- ISBN: 0-374-34929-0 (1997 ed.)
- OCLC: 35235132
- LC Class: PZ7.L5385 Me 1997
- Preceded by: A Full House: An Austin Family Christmas
- Followed by: The Moon by Night

Meet the Austins is the title of a 1960 novel by Madeleine L'Engle, the first of her books about the Austin family. It introduces the characters Vicky Austin and her three siblings, and Maggy Hamilton, an orphan.

== Plot ==
Vicky Austin's noisy, loving, mostly-happy family is disrupted when the family's honorary uncle dies in a plane crash. His co-pilot was also killed, leaving behind a ten-year-old daughter, Maggy, who has no one to care for her. The Austins take Maggy in, and she proves to be a spoiled, troubled only child who had very little family life. Maggy encourages Vicky's sister Suzy to misbehave, which makes everyone's life more difficult. Meet the Austins is largely episodic; each chapter covers a specific incident such as Vicky's bicycle accident or a family vacation. Throughout the book, Vicky comments on the changes her family experiences during this time, and the reader sees her growing self-awareness. Although Vicky will later appear in three novels that have fantasy and/or science fiction themes, there are no such elements in Meet the Austins.

== Characters ==
- Victoria "Vicky" Austin is the protagonist and first-person narrator, as she is in most but not all of the Austin family novels. Born in New York City, she lives with her family in rural Thornhill, somewhere in New England. She is twelve years old at the beginning of the novel. Her uncle Douglas describes Vicky as having an artistic temperament, but Vicky claims not to have a talent for anything.
- John Austin, Vicky's elder brother, is a budding scientist whose homemade space suit won a prize in a statewide Science fair. John (like Vicky) was born in New York City when his father was 24 years old. John is fifteen years old as of chapter one of the novel. Vicky describes him as being "the nicest one of us all."
- Suzanne "Suzy" Austin, Vicky's sister, is just nine years old as the novel opens, but already knows that she wants to be a doctor. All of her games are oriented on her playing the doctor, including many mock operations on broken dolls. A year younger than Maggy, she is Maggy's chief friend and playmate. Suzy is blonde and considered the beauty of the family. Suzy's refusal to eat pork after reading Charlotte's Web is based on an actual incident with L'Engle's elder daughter.
- Robert "Rob" Austin is Vicky's wise, loving baby brother, age four (almost five) as the story opens. The family enjoys his creative "God bless" litanies and other surprising things he says. His favorite toy is a plush elephant, named Elephant's Child after one of the Just-So Stories by Rudyard Kipling. The toy has a working music box, until Maggy breaks it. L'Engle acknowledged in her book A Circle of Quiet that the character is based on her son, Bion Franklin.
- Margaret "Maggy" Hamilton is the orphaned daughter of a jet-setting mother and a test pilot father. She is ten years old, loud and attention-seeking. She spends most of her time with Suzy, and the two often are punished for their mischievous ways. The character's background is one of privilege and neglect. Maggy has many toys but minimal discipline, and little contact with her parents. After Maggy's mother died of pneumonia during a trip to Spain, Maggy went to live with her father, Dick Hamilton, who died a month later.

Rounding out the family are Vicky's father, Dr. Wallace "Wally" Austin, a doctor in general practice; her mother Victoria Eaton Austin, a retired singer; an uncle, Douglas Austin, a painter who occasionally visits; Aunt Elena, actually a close family friend who is the Austins' connection with the orphaned Maggy; and Grandfather Eaton, a retired minister who lives in a converted stable on fictional Seven Bay Island.

== Series notes ==
Although Meet the Austins, as the name implies, is the family's first appearance in terms of the publication date, a short, later book, The Twenty-Four Days Before Christmas (1964), takes place five years earlier. Another short Christmas story about the Austins, A Full House: An Austin Family Christmas, takes place about a year before Meet the Austins. A Full House was first published as a short story in two of L'Engle's collections, and then issued as a picture book in 1999. Meet the Austins is followed, in terms of internal chronology as well as publication date, by the full-length novels The Moon by Night (1963), The Young Unicorns (1968), A Ring of Endless Light (1980) and Troubling a Star (1994). Suzy Austin appears as a married adult in A Severed Wasp (1982).

== Publication details ==
The 1960 first edition of Meet the Austins was published only after many rejections, reportedly because it begins with a death. The original publication left out a chapter about the children's "Anti-Muffin" club, which advocated diversity and portrayed the Austin children as having a close friend who was poor and Hispanic. ("Muffins" are a metaphor for conformity and snobbery.) This missing chapter was published separately in 1980 as The Anti-Muffins. In 1997, the hardcover publisher of L'Engle's novels from 1962 on, Farrar, Straus & Giroux, issued a new edition of Meet the Austins that for the first time incorporated the chapter. Paperback editions prior to 1997 did not include this additional material. However, the next book in the series, The Moon by Night, includes a scene in which Vicky tells Zachary Gray about the Anti-Muffin club, in very nearly the same text that introduces it in the originally-omitted chapter. The 1997 Square Fish paperback edition includes "The Anti-Muffins" as Chapter Five of the book.

== Gallery ==
Meet the Austins book cover by Dennis Nolan
