= The Moon by Night =

1963 young adult novel by Madeleine L'Engle

- dust jacket to the hardcover edition
- Author: Madeleine L'Engle
- Cover artist: H. Lawrence Hoffman
- Language: English
- Series: Austin family
- Subject: Camping, relationships
- Genre: Young Adult
- Publisher: Farrar, Straus & Giroux
- Publication date: 1963
- Publication place: United States
- Media type: Print (hardback)
- Pages: 218 pp
- ISBN: 0-374-35049-3
- OCLC: 16691018
- LC Class: PZ7.L5385 Mo.
- Preceded by: Meet the Austins
- Followed by: The Young Unicorns

The Moon by Night (ISBN 0-374-35049-3) is the title of a young adult novel by Madeleine L'Engle. Published in 1963, it is the second novel about Vicky Austin and her family, taking place between the events of Meet the Austins (1960) and The Young Unicorns (1968), and more or less concurrently with the O'Keefe family novel The Arm of the Starfish. The book marks the first appearance of the character Zachary Gray, who dates first Vicky and then (in later books) Polly O'Keefe. Although Vicky will later appear in three novels that have fantasy and/or science fiction themes, there are no such elements in The Moon By Night.

== Plot summary ==
In The Moon by Night (ISBN 0-374-35049-3), Vicky and her family are on a cross-country camping trip, meant to be a transition between their life in rural Thornhill, Connecticut and a very different one in New York City, where Vicky's father, Dr. Wallace Austin, will be doing research. In another big change in Vicky's life, Maggy Hamilton, an orphan who has been living with the Austins since her father's death, goes to live with her legal guardian Elena, who is marrying Vicky's uncle, Douglas Austin. Uncle Douglas and his new family move to Laguna Beach, California, where Vicky's family is to visit them during their travels. The first chapter begins with the wedding of Elena and Douglas.

The family's adventures show its differences from contemporary society. Along the way, they meet a teenage gang in Tennessee, help rescue children from a flood in Texas, and find an abandoned baby at a campsite in Utah. Vicky's younger sister Suzy grows emotionally during the trip, from wanting to adopt a fawn near the beginning to her later swift and competent rendering of first aid when another child is injured, despite wrong-headed demands by nearby adults. They see bears several times, and though they always act properly, their peers sometimes do not, with dangerous results. They also encounter anti-U.S. sentiment in a campground in Canada and intimations of the Cold War throughout their journey.

Early in the trip, at a Tennessee campground, Vicky meets Zachary Gray, who arrives with his parents in a luxuriously equipped tent trailer pulled by a brand new black station wagon. She finds him charming, handsome and intelligent, but also frightening in his cynicism and recklessness. He pursues her (in person and with notes left behind) at other campgrounds across the country and in Laguna Beach. Vicky enjoys this attention, but the rest of her family dislikes Zach. She resents this, torn between obedience to her family and her growing need for independence.

Observing Zachary's paleness and shortness of breath during an interpretive hike in Mesa Verde, Vicky's father, a doctor, deduces that he has a history of rheumatic fever that has damaged his heart. Dr. Austin several times orders the boy to avoid strenuous exercise as he accompanies Vicky and her family in their sightseeing.

Late in the trip, at Yellowstone National Park, Vicky meets Andy Ford, another boy who becomes interested in her. Andy is more emotionally stable than Zachary and far more cheerful, but also less exciting. Zachary turns up with his parents at the Austins' next destination, in the Black Ram section of Wyoming, and exhibits jealousy toward Andy. A few hours later, a game of hide and seek ends with Zachary missing. As the Austins search for him, Zachary lures Vicky to a remote mountainside to speak with her privately about Andy. Vicky turns to return to her family, but is unable to do so after an earthquake brings down her side of the mountain in an avalanche. Zachary is trapped between two large rocks with a broken wrist. Vicky comes to terms with her concerns about the precariousness of life and the existence of a loving God, and Zachary promises to take better care of himself. Vicky waits with Zachary until help arrives.

== Major characters ==
- Vicky Austin — The heroine of the Austin family series of novels and stories, Vicky is the first person narrator of this book and others. Fourteen years old at the time of the novel, Vicky is beginning to assert her independence from her family, going off by herself to think, questioning her religious upbringing and other attitudes, and learning, through travel and her conversations with Zachary, that the world is much bigger and more diverse than she previously encountered in her sheltered life with her family in rural Thornhill, Connecticut.
- John Austin — Vicky's scientifically minded older brother, John, has graduated early from high school at approximately age 17, and has been accepted at M.I.T. He is primarily interested in astrophysics. John is intellectually curious and philosophical, generally loyal and kind-hearted. However, he has a low tolerance for Zachary.
- Suzy Austin — Generally considered the beauty of the family, Suzy "has wanted to be a doctor ever since she could talk." At age eleven, she already knows more about first aid than many adults, and puts this knowledge to use without fuss or panic. Suzy is fond of animals, and keeps lists of species encountered on the trip.
- Rob Austin — The youngest of the Austin children, Robert Austin is curious and loving, with a penchant for insightful questions and unintentional wordplay. Madeleine L'Engle has acknowledged that Rob is based on her own youngest child, Bion Franklin.
- Dr. Wallace Austin, or "Wally", is the father of the four Austin children, and elder brother of Douglas Austin, an artist. Their mother died when Douglas was born, and their father also died early. Wallace is a "country doctor" in general practice, who also does research when he can. As of The Moon by Night, he has temporarily turned his practice over to another doctor so he can spend a year conducting research at a New York City hospital.
- Victoria Austin, Vicky's mother and namesake, is the daughter of Reverend Eaton, a popular minister who also spent time as a missionary in Africa. Victoria attended boarding school in Switzerland, where she met her best friend Elena, who eventually marries Douglas Austin. Victoria briefly sang professionally, and an album was made of her songs. She met Wallace Austin while singing to injured soldiers at a Veterans Administration hospital.
- Zachary Gray — Student. Extremely affluent but directionless, Zachary, a student who was recently "kicked out" of Hotchkiss, vacillates between his desires for redemption and self-destruction. Charming, exciting, unpredictable and emotionally needy, Zach brings out both the best and worst in Vicky. Zachary shows a strong interest in anthropology and is quite knowledgeable on the subject, but rejects it as a possible profession because "there's no money in it." He has a damaged heart as the result of rheumatic fever, but refuses to see any more doctors and is not sure there is any point in trying to stay alive in a troubled world.

== Themes ==
The novel touches on such themes as the fear of human annihilation, especially nuclear annihilation; the then-imminent changes in sex roles; the power of America; the question of whether human beings are basically good or evil; and the existence or non-existence of God. L'Engle's narrative shows the same respect for adolescent intelligence that is prominent in A Wrinkle In Time and its sequels. For example, Zachary discusses anthropology knowledgeably with Vicky, and Classical music is important in Vicky's life. (Elena Austin is a famous classical pianist.)

Although the chronology of Madeleine L'Engle's Austin family and Murry-O'Keefe books places the events of The Moon by Night decades later, the concerns of the narrative itself are very much of the Cold War era. Vicky refers to fallout shelters, Duck and cover, and, indirectly, to the involvement of Oak Ridge, Tennessee in the Manhattan Project. On several occasions Vicky expresses fear and dismay about the precarious situation in her world.

Beyond these, the major theme and conflict of the story is Vicky's adolescent struggle to establish her own identity as distinct from that of her family, reconciling her existing loyalties with her growing need for independence. As she states in chapter 8: "You have to go off by yourself or you must stop being you, and after all I was just beginning to be me." Having spent her childhood as a happy member of a large family, the fourteen-year-old has recently come to feel that her family was "holding me back, keeping me from growing up and being myself."

During the Austins' stay in Laguna Beach, Zachary takes Vicky to a performance of The Diary of Anne Frank, which leads Vicky to worry about God's apparent failure to protect Anne Frank from man's inhumanity to man. The narrative quotes several times from Psalm 121, particularly the passage from which the novel's title is taken:

The sun shall not smite thee by day,
Nor the moon by night.
The Lord shall preserve thee from all evil;
He shall preserve thy soul.

Vicky takes note of the use of the psalm as a prayer in the play, just before the Nazis arrest the Frank family. Zachary also urges Vicky to accept his belief that there is no God to protect her. Yet at the end of the novel, despite her earlier ambivalence toward religion, Vicky makes her stand against Zachary's nihilism, and cries out the words of the psalm as she awaits rescue.

== Awards ==
- Winner of Austrian State Literary Prize, 1969.

== Background and context ==
The novel is based on a real-life camping trip made in the spring of 1959 by Madeleine L'Engle and her family, the Franklins, during which she first had the idea for A Wrinkle in Time. Like the Austins, the Franklins took their long vacation during a period of transition between life in a Connecticut farmhouse and relocating to New York City. In her introduction to the current Laurel-Leaf paperback editions of the Austin family novels, L'Engle states: "Somebody remarked to me that the books about the Austin family might just as well be about my own family. Indeed, the Austins do a great many things that my family did...." L'Engle writes about the Franklin family's camping trip in A Circle of Quiet and in her foreword to the 25th Anniversary Collectors' Edition of A Wrinkle in Time.

== Related works ==
At one point in The Moon by Night, Suzy Austin makes a joke about "tessering", and Vicky's first person narrative identifies this comment as relating to the story of Meg and Charles Wallace Murry. This reference to the events of A Wrinkle in Time, which was published the previous year, may be seen as "breaking the fourth wall", but alternatively may mean that the Austins are aware of the Murrys' experiences as actual past events. Since Vicky and Meg's daughter, Polly O'Keefe, both date Zachary Gray, Vicky and Suzy are referring to events a generation earlier. The Murrys and the Austins live in similarly described rural settings in Connecticut, so the Austins' knowledge of the Murrys may be locally derived.

The Moon by Night takes place about two years (perhaps slightly less) after Meet the Austins, which begins when Vicky is twelve years old. Vicky is fourteen going on fifteen in The Moon by Night, but initially lies to Zachary that she is sixteen. After the camping trip, the Austins spend approximately a year in New York City, during which they experience the events of The Young Unicorns, aided by recurring L'Engle character Canon Tallis. The following summer, in A Ring of Endless Light, Vicky meets another major L'Engle character, Adam Eddington, and also renews her relationship with Zachary.

The Austins' camping trip is said to begin in the spring before school lets out. This places the beginning of the novel shortly before the events of The Arm of the Starfish, in which Adam Eddington takes a summer internship with Calvin O'Keefe, and must decide whether to trust O'Keefe and Canon Tallis or, alternatively, Kali Cutter (who betrays him). When Adam meets Vicky the following summer, John Austin alludes to Adam's bad experience with Kali.

== Nomenclature ==
- Zachary's last name is spelled "Grey" in both hardcover and paperback editions of The Moon by Night, but Gray in subsequent books. In A Ring of Endless Light, Vicky describes his eyes as being "gray, the way his name is spelled" as opposed to "grey".
- The book's title is taken from the King James Version of Psalm 121.
