= Bion Barnett =

American banker (1857–1958)

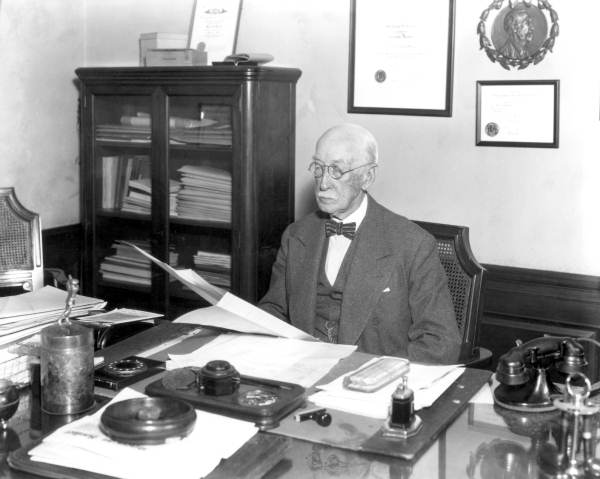
- Born: Bion Hall Barnett; October 7, 1857; Hiawatha, Kansas Territory, U.S.
- Died: October 30, 1958 (aged 101); Jacksonville, Florida, U.S.
- Education: University of Kansas
- Occupation: Banker
- Known for: Co-founder, President and Chairman of Barnett Bank

Bion Hall Barnett (October 7, 1857 – October 30, 1958) was an American banker. In 1877 he co-founded Barnett Bank, known as "Florida's Bank", the largest in the U.S. state of Florida at the time of its acquisition by NationsBank in 1997.

== Early years ==
He was born in Hiawatha, Kansas, the son of William Boyd Barnett and the former Sarah Jane Blue. His father was a merchant and a banker in northeast Kansas.

He was the younger of two children who lived to adulthood. His older brother, Will (five years older) moved from Kansas to Jacksonville, Florida to start a furniture business in 1874, just as Bion enrolled at the University of Kansas. Will spoke highly of Florida's moderate winter, so the following year, his parents journeyed to Jacksonville to visit their oldest son. Sarah Barnett suffered from neuralgia, but her health improved during their time in Florida, so the Barnetts returned to Kansas, liquidated their assets, and relocated to Jacksonville in March 1877. Bion, who was a college senior, withdrew from school to join his parents three months before graduation.

== Bank of Jacksonville ==
On May 7, 1877, Barnett opened the Bank of Jacksonville on the corner of Main and Forsyth with $43,000 in capital. William was president, Bion acted as bookkeeper, and one other person was hired as teller/clerk. Most Florida banks at the time were private and unregulated. In spite of being a newcomer and a Yankee, Barnett and the new institution slowly gained the people's trust, but at the end of their first year, deposits only amounted to $11,000. William then invited Bion to be partner.

=== Growth ===
A conversation between Bion Barnett and Henry L'Engle changed the bank's fortunes. L'Engle, the Duval County Tax Collector, was annoyed because the bank holding the county's funds charged $6.25 for each transfer to New York City banks. Bion offered to waive the fee if Duval County deposited their funds in the Bank of Jacksonville. L'Engle agreed, and the BoJ began to prosper. Within a year, L'Engle was appointed treasurer for the State of Florida, and the state's accounts were transferred to BoJ. Within a few years, operating capital exceeded $150,000, and in 1888, the Barnetts applied for and received a "National Charter", pursuant to the National Bank Act. This allowed them to become the National Bank of Jacksonville. The institution's deposits exceeded $1 million in 1893. Florida's first Burroughs Adding Machine was installed at the bank during this time.

=== Lessons learned ===
Around 1890, Bion invested $3,000 in a phosphate mining enterprise that promised a return of $100,000 in three months time. When he lost the entire amount, he never again speculated, and applied that same principle at Barnett Bank. He was fond of telling people, "It is not the things you don't know that get you in trouble. It is the things you think you know for sure that get you in trouble."

On Barnett Bank's 50th anniversary in 1927, Bion repeated his father's Five Rules of Business:

1. Follow the Golden Rule. You cannot go wrong treating the other man as you would be treated.

2. Give a man 50 cents if you can make a dollar out of him. In other words, be liberal in your dealings but always have a net profit. Do not do business at a loss.

3. If a young man is of good habits—honest, capable, saving, giving close attention to his business and making progress but lacking in capital—help him. The young man of today is the businessman of tomorrow.

4. Never make a promise you cannot and do not fulfill. Investigate carefully before granting a line of credit; once granted, there being no adverse change in your client's financial condition, fulfill your promise. Your word must be as good as your bond.

5. Watch your expense account and your losses; your profits will take care of themselves.

=== 20th century ===
The Great Fire of 1901 destroyed most of the city, and the National Bank of Jacksonville was the only bank still standing. When Bion's father died on October 21, 1903, Bion became president and resolved to rename the institution in his father's honor. The bank was rechartered as the Barnett National Bank of Jacksonville in 1908.

For their 50th anniversary, the bank built and moved into the 18-story Barnett National Bank Building, the tallest structure in Jacksonville from 1926 to 1954. Bion Barnett commented "that the family-owned institution had endured epidemics, fire, freezes, and financial panics".

=== Depression ===
In 1929, Barnett tried unsuccessfully to merge with Florida National Bank. In the fall of that year, Barnett sold a large part of Barnett Bank's stock to Baker, Fentress & Company, which owned Consolidated Naval Stores in Jacksonville. The infusion of capital left the bank stronger, but ended complete family control of the institution.

A bank holding company was begun after the stock market crash in 1929, and Barnett National Securities Corporation purchased and reopened several failed banks. The day before a bank holiday on March 5, 1933, Barnett expected a bank run. To prevent this, Bion directed the bank's personnel to pull all small denomination bills from the vault, and leave the $50s, $100s, $500s and $1,000 bills. Tellers were instructed to slowly count each withdrawal. Those at the end of the line saw their friends and neighbors leave the bank carrying large stacks of bills, which prompted many customers to regain confidence and leave without their money.

The bank continued to grow with the acquisition of many more Florida banks over the next two decades.

== Personal ==
Barnett married Carolina Hallowes L'Engle on April 8, 1880; the union produced four children: Madeleine Barnett, William L'Engle Barnett, Bion Hall Barnett Jr., and Donald Murray Barnett. Their grandchildren included noted author Madeleine L'Engle. The Barnetts kept a home in France, and stayed there for extended visits. Barnett enjoyed golfing in Scotland.

Sometime before 1910, Bion and Carolina Barnett divorced. In 1910, he married Mrs. Anna Hardy Bell Daniel, the daughter of Dr. Alexander Taylor Bell of Baltimore, Maryland. Anna was born in Norfolk, Virginia on 6 May 1867. Bion and Anna made their home in North Berwick, Scotland, where they renovated a property known as "Gribdae". Between 1910 and 1937 when Anna died, Bion Barnett had made 29 transatlantic crossings and Anna made 19. Applications for passport renewals were usually made at the United States Consulate in Scotland. At the time of her death, Anna Barnett was living in Monte Carlo, Monaco in a villa named La Biondella. Her obituary in the (Jacksonville) Florida Times-Union, dated December 24, 1937, reported that her husband was with her at the time of her death. Anna Barnett had two daughters with her first husband, Richard Bowen Daniel, from whom she was divorced in 1906–1907.

== Public service ==
Beginning in the late 19th century, Jacksonville's Board of Bond Trustees controlled most government operations, including the municipal electric plant, the city water and sewer departments, the fire and police departments, and hired all city employees except elected officials. Barnett was a member or chairman of the board from October 1896 to March 1911 when he resigned.

He was a prominent Mason; treasurer of Damascus Commandry, Knights Templar; a member of the Seminole Club, the Florida Yacht Club, the Florida Country Club and the Benevolent and Protective Order of Elks.

== Retirement ==
Barnett retired from the board of Barnett Bank with 75 years of service in 1952 at the age of 94 and was named honorary chairman. Every evening thereafter, a courier delivered the bank's daily business report, which he studied while sipping a bourbon, followed by a cigar. Bion died in 1958 at age 101.

== Family Papers ==
In 2019, the Barnett/Camp/Franklin family papers came to the Sophia Smith Collection of Women's History at Smith College from Barnett's granddaughter, writer Madeleine L'Engle. The collection consists of 43 linear feet of family, personal, and literary papers, and includes Barnett's personal correspondence with his son, his father, his daughter, and his writer granddaughter. Also included are: news clippings about Barnett and the Barnett Bank, records of assets and stocks, his will, and other miscellaneous written materials. The papers were donated by the family's estate.
