= A Severed Wasp =

1982 novel by Madeleine L'Engle

- First edition
- Author: Madeleine L'Engle
- Cover artist: Muriel Nasser
- Language: English
- Series: Katherine Forrester
- Genre: Suspense novel
- Publisher: Farrar, Straus & Giroux
- Publication date: 1982
- Publication place: United States
- Media type: Print (hardback & paperback)
- Pages: 388 pp
- ISBN: 0-374-26131-8
- OCLC: 8805735
- Dewey Decimal: 813/.54 19
- LC Class: PS3523.E55 S4 1982
- Preceded by: The Small Rain

A Severed Wasp (1982) is a novel by Madeleine L'Engle. It continues the story of a pianist, Katherine Forrester, who was first seen in The Small Rain. Now a widow in her seventies, Katherine Forrester Vigneras returns to New York City in retirement from concert touring in Europe. There she encounters Felix Bodeway, an old friend from her Greenwich Village days, who is now the retired Episcopal Bishop of New York. He asks Katherine to give a benefit concert at the Cathedral of St. John the Divine. It turns out to be an unexpected challenge, full of new friends and mysterious dangers.

During the novel Katherine is befriended by several recurring characters from other L'Engle novels, including Mimi Oppenheimer from A Winter's Love, Josiah "Dave" Davidson from The Young Unicorns, and Suzy Austin (now Dr. Suzy Davidson) from the Austin family series (which L'Engle called her "Chronos" novels).

The Cathedral of Saint John the Divine, which figures prominently in the plot of A Severed Wasp, is also the setting for the 1968 L'Engle novel The Young Unicorns. The author herself was librarian and writer-in-residence at the same cathedral for several decades.

This story takes place last in the L'Engle canon of "Kairos" and "Chronos" stories, as it features the adult Suzy Austin and the adult Josiah Davidson. No novel published after A Severed Wasp took place during or after the events of this one.

== Major characters ==
- Katherine Forrester (Vigneras) — Pianist. In L'Engle's first published novel, The Small Rain (the first half of which was republished as Prelude), Katherine Forrester is a gifted but socially isolated adolescent studying to be a concert pianist at a strict boarding school. Katherine reappears in A Severed Wasp as an old woman (now Katherine Vigneras, from her marriage to her piano teacher and mentor Justin) looking back on her life and career while facing new dangers. Katherine Vigneras also appears very briefly in A Ring of Endless Light playing a recital that Vicky Austin and Zachary Gray attend.
- Mimi Oppenheimer (called Mimi Opp) — Surgeon. The character first appeared in A Winter's Love as the best friend of Virginia Bowen, whose mother contemplates having an affair as Virginia and Mimi spend their break from boarding school with Virginia's parents in the Haute-Savoie. In A Severed Wasp, Mimi is Katherine Forrester's neighbor and confidante. Mimi is a surgeon who, despite being Jewish and a bit of an agnostic, is friends with several people at the Cathedral of Saint John the Divine, especially retired bishop Felix Bodeway and Suzy Davidson. Mimi's grandmother was one of the Renier family; she is thus related to Simon Renier of Dragons in the Waters, Queron Renier of A House Like a Lotus and Stella Renier of The Other Side of the Sun.
- Felix Bodeway — Bishop. Like Katherine, Felix first appears in The Small Rain, encountering Katherine in New York City when Katherine has finished school and has Sarah Courtmont for a roommate. Felix is Sarah's boyfriend of sorts, a Bohemian would-be violinist with aspirations to be a "window cleaner" — that is, to help people see beyond themselves. Considered by Katherine to be a "lightweight" at the time of The Small Rain, she finds him much changed fifty years later, a retired bishop who has suffered, and is gentle, compassionate and afraid. He eventually confesses to having experimented with homosexuality and dissolute behavior as a young man, and it is implied there is an unrequited sexual component to his love for the present bishop, Allie Undercroft.
- Alwood "Allie" Undercroft — Bishop. The bishop of St. John the Divine at the time of the novel, Bishop Undercroft is an old friend of Felix Bodeway, husband of the vindictive Yolanda Xabo Undercroft, a retired singer, and the ex-husband of Sister Isobel, a nun and educator. From their first meeting, Katherine is struck by Undercroft's strong resemblance to Lukas von Hilpert, the onetime Kommandant of the prison camp where Katherine's husband Justin had his hands broken during World War II. During the course of the novel we learn that Lukas unknowingly fathered one of Katherine's children, and that Undercroft is Lukas' son.
- Suzy Austin Davidson — Cardiologist. A major character in the Austin family series of novels, Suzy "wanted to be a doctor ever since she could talk." A young child in her first appearance, she gives up eating pork after reading Charlotte's Web, and is the best friend of Maggy Hamilton when Maggy lives with the Austin family for a time. In later books she shows some jealousy toward her sister, Vicky Austin. As an adult, Suzy is a cardiologist, married to Josiah "Dave" Davidson. They have four children, Josiah (Jos), John, Emily, and Tory.
- Josiah "Dave" Davidson — Dean. A somewhat troubled teenager in The Young Unicorns, his first appearance, Dave is a carpenter's son, a former member of the Alphabats gang, a former choirboy at St. John the Divine Cathedral, and the friend and sometime protector of the Austin children. At the end of the novel, his father having died, Dave moves in with the Dean of the Cathedral, Juan de Henares and rejoins the Cathedral choir. As an adult in A Severed Wasp Dave is the Dean of the Cathedral of St. John the Divine, married to the former Suzy Austin, and a friend of Mimi Oppenheimer.

== Crossover characters ==
Mimi Oppenheimer from A Winter's Love and Suzy Austin Davidson and Josiah "Dave" Davidson from the Chronos series (Austin family series) all appear in A Severed Wasp.

In addition, Philippa "Flip" Hunter, the protagonist of the early L'Engle novel And Both Were Young, is mentioned repeatedly in A Severed Wasp as a successful and respected artist, who painted a portrait decades earlier of Katherine Vigneras with her young son. The story of Flip, a talented artist who in her youth was initially miserable at a Swiss boarding school (as recounted in And Both Were Young), closely parallels that of Katherine Forrester (later Vigneras) in The Small Rain, and loosely parallels L'Engle's own experiences in boarding school.

== Themes ==
The title comes from a quote found in a book review by George Orwell:

I thought of a rather cruel trick I once played on a wasp. He was sucking jam on my plate, and I cut him in half. He paid no attention, merely went on with his meal, while a tiny stream of jam trickled out of his severed esophagus. Only when he tried to fly away did he grasp the dreadful thing that had happened to him. It is the same with modern man. The thing that has been cut away is his soul, and there was a period -- twenty years, perhaps -- when he did not notice it.

— "Notes On The Way", George Orwell: The Collected Essays, Journalism & Letters. Volume Two, ISBN 1-56792-134-5

The selection of this quote at first appears ironic. In his essay, Orwell laments that the search for truth requires giving up all belief in religion, yet without religion mankind lacks a moral base. L'Engle was a member of the Episcopal Church, writing about flawed people in a religious community. L'Engle's characters comment on this, even as the events of the novel dramatize the problem:

"It's all too easy to see the Church in that image, the greedy wasp unaware of its brokenness. And I don't mean just the Episcopal Church which still hasn't rid itself of its image—"

"God's frozen people," Bishop Juxon murmured.

Undercroft nodded, "It's also the Romans, the Evangelicals, the Pentecostals, all of us who believe we profess Christ."

— A Severed Wasp, page 60.

The character Felix Bodeway then states what may be seen as L'Engle's response to Orwell: "Once that we recognize that we're broken, we have a chance to mend." As Carole F. Chase states in her book Suncatcher: A Study of Madeleine L'Engle And Her Writing, L'Engle recognizes "that the church is broken," and that its community "reflects the humanness (and therefore the imperfections) of its participants," which extends to the events of the novel. Characters associated with the Cathedral perpetrate and suffer from "blackmail, threatening phone calls, violence, drugs, jealousy, and revenge motives." Though wounded and imperfect, L'Engle finds value in the Cathedral community's capacity for (in Chase's words) "understanding, compassion, forgiveness and acceptance." As Chase notes, "Forgiveness–and the question of who is qualified to forgive–is one of the main themes of A Severed Wasp. Madeleine believes firmly that all who know their own need of forgiveness, and who have experienced forgiveness and love, can forgive others."
