= Camilla Dickinson =

1951 novel by Madeleine L'Engle

- First edition
- Author: Madeleine L'Engle
- Language: English
- Series: Camilla Dickinson
- Genre: Young Adult
- Publisher: Simon & Schuster
- Publication date: 1951
- Publication place: United States
- Media type: Print (Hardback, Paperback)
- Pages: 245 pages (Hardback)
- Followed by: A Live Coal in the Sea

Camilla Dickinson is a 1951 novel by Madeleine L'Engle about the first romance of two teenagers from dysfunctional families in New York City. In 1965, it was republished in slightly different form under the title Camilla.

== Plot summary ==
Fifteen-year-old Camilla Dickinson narrates an important period of her life spanning approximately three weeks in November 1950. Camilla lives on Park Avenue in New York City with her wealthy parents Rose, who is beautiful yet irresponsible and overdramatic, and Rafferty, a stern, responsible architect. The quiet, thoughtful and undramatic Camilla dreams of becoming an astronomer, but must deal with the constant ups and downs of her parents' troubled marriage. Rose has begun an affair with a man named Jacques, which Camilla accidentally discovers when she walks in on Rose and Jacques kissing. Rose begs Camilla to keep it a secret, but Rafferty wants Camilla to be honest and tell him the truth. Rose and Rafferty fight, and Rose ends up attempting suicide, which has the desired effect of bringing Rafferty back to her. Camilla is torn between her loyalty to both parents, and begins to realize they are very imperfect people. She also has difficulty dealing with her feelings towards her parents, and initially does not want to discuss her situation with anyone outside the family.

Camilla's new best friend, Luisa Rowan, has parents with a similarly dysfunctional marriage who fight constantly and seem likely to get a divorce. In contrast to Camilla, Luisa's family is not affluent, she lives in Greenwich Village with bohemian parents, and she is more open to discussing her family problems. Luisa aspires to become a psychiatrist and at one point attempts to psychoanalyze Camilla.

Camilla then meets and befriends Frank, Luisa's older brother. Frank understands Camilla's problems and assists her in accepting her parents' flaws. Frank encourages Camilla to define herself, not by her family, but to define herself as who she truly is. Frank also takes the sheltered Camilla to see people and places that she has never experienced before, including visiting a young, disabled war veteran who ends up giving Camilla her first kiss. Frank and Camilla have deep conversations about life, religion, philosophy, growing up, and dealing with difficult situations, and the pair begin to form a romantic attachment, much to the chagrin of Luisa. Despite Luisa's anger, Camilla feels that Frank is the one person she can really talk to.

Just as Camilla is getting comfortable with the way things are, everything changes again. Frank and Luisa's parents break up, and Frank is forced to suddenly move away with his father, without even telling Camilla goodbye in person. Camilla's parents decide to work on their marriage and go on a European vacation together, sending Camilla to boarding school while they're gone. While Camilla is heartbroken by the loss of her closest relationships, she uses the inner strength she has gained in the past weeks to deal with the changes in her life.

== Themes ==
=== Spirituality ===
Spirituality is a major theme found with Camilla and many other of Madeleine L'Engle's works. As Camilla continues to grow, explore, and experience life, she is beginning to further question and seek to understand God. The reader sees Camilla go talk to and discuss God with different individuals all throughout the story. Some, like Camilla's dear friend Luisa claim there is no God, yet desire to believe there is one. Camilla discusses her different views with Frank and together they work through their own understanding and how to deal with the empty pieties of their elders.

==== Family ====
Families play a vital role. They influence the way that Camilla and her peers (specifically Luisa and Frank) view love and family. The Stephanowskis bring hope back the story when the reader sees their family and their relationships with each other. This brings hope to Camilla and Frank as well. L'engle shows how important families are in building and creating a person's views on the world and themselves, but also the work that it takes to be a family because it is not one mass thinking unanimously. These are individuals with individual thoughts and ideas coming together to try and work as one in the best way that they can. There is a lot of forgiving and understanding that goes on.

==== Innocence ====
Throughout the novel Camilla starts out as this naive sheltered child, but as the story progresses, she moves from her innocent state as she experiences and discovers the world around her. Part of growing up is moving away from the protection and sheltered-ness that comes with innocence. Yet, her move from innocence doesn't feel unnatural or bad, it is merely part of growing up and becoming an adult. It is normal for a teenager to begin to look at the world and see new things and ask different questions, it is normal to begin seeking new experiences and gaining new understandings of past experiences. That move out of innocence is normal and while it may seem to have disappeared all at once, does draw away gradually until suddenly it seems, it is no longer there.

==== Individuality and Identity ====
Individualism is another major element of this story. Camilla is seeking to find herself as she experiences a loss of innocence and begins to really explore the world around her. She is impressed by many different opinions and ideas, she is pulled in different directions by her parents. At the beginning of the novel there is a great feeling of overwhelmed that comes from Camilla, but as the story progresses and she begins of find what she is really interested in and believes in, her footing becomes more solid. But this individualism isn't just seen with Camilla, it is why all the characters struggle the way that they do. Rose Dickinson is feeling the loss of her beauty with age, and it scares her because that is such a large part of her identity and foundation of who she is, what is she without it? Rafferty is strong and stiff, it is not part of him to show the same affection that Rose wants. Part of coming into individuality is learning to work with others in their individualism. As the end of the story comes, the reader sees this more blatantly.

== Main characters ==
- Camilla Dickinson – The fifteen-year-old narrator; an aspiring astronomer and the only child of wealthy but troubled parents.
- Rose Dickinson – Camilla's mother, who is having an affair. She is very beautiful, but weak, foolish and needy.
- Rafferty Dickinson – Camilla's father. He is an architect, serious and cold. However, he is also weak in that he is unable to leave Rose, no matter what she does.
- Luisa Rowan – Camilla's best friend, from a less affluent bohemian family. Luisa is strong-willed and very possessive, especially when it comes to Camilla. Her parents are also having serious marital issues.
- Frank Rowan – Luisa's older brother who has recently returned from boarding school. He is very philosophical and passionate but is also troubled by his own problems.
- Mona Rowan – Luisa and Frank's mother, she spends her weekends entirely drunk. She is accused of feeling to much.
- Bill Rowan – Luisa and Frank's father, very little is seen of him. His fights with Mona are a prevalent part of the story and help move the story along. He is accused of lacking feeling which plays into the idea that is discussed throughout the novel about being alive and living.
- David Gauss – A kind and thoughtful young war veteran who is Frank's friend. He lost both of his legs in World War II and lives with his mother in Greenwich Village. He plays a role in helping to further Camilla's different views on the world.
- Jacques – Rose's lover. He is both intelligent and manipulative; Camilla never trusts or likes him. She seems to have put all the blame of her parents' rough relationship onto him.
- Pompilia Riccoli – Frank's ex-girlfriend. Camilla is not very happy when her name is brought up.
- The Stephanowskis – They are the only parental couple in the novel that are intact and continuing to get along; they give hope for a better future and the prospect of love that lasts, and staying alive even when hard and troubling things happen.

== Film adaptation ==
An adaptation of the novel was made into a film written and directed by Cornelia Moore, featuring Adelaide Clemens as Camilla Dickinson, Gregg Sulkin as Frank Rowan, Cary Elwes as Rafferty and Samantha Mathis as Rose. The project began filming in Spokane, Washington in mid-November 2010.

The film premiered on May 20, 2012 at Seattle International Film Festival.

== Sequel ==
In 1996, L'Engle published a sequel to Camilla Dickinson entitled A Live Coal in the Sea, in which Camilla, now a grandmother and a renowned astronomer, tells the story of her life to her granddaughter. The Dickinson parents and the Rowans also appear in the sequel. Rose Dickinson continues her promiscuous and irresponsible behavior; Camilla and Frank Rowan (who becomes a publisher) are shown to have later resumed their friendship, but not their romantic relationship, and they marry other people.

== Crossover characters ==
Frank Rowan appears very briefly in L'Engle's 1984 novel A House Like a Lotus, as a publisher in Istanbul whose wife was killed in an automobile accident, in which he also lost one leg.
