= A Live Coal in the Sea =

1996 novel by Madeleine L'Engle

- Author: Madeleine L'Engle
- Language: English
- Series: Camilla Dickinson
- Publisher: Farrar Straus Giroux
- Publication date: 1996
- Publication place: United States
- Media type: Print (hardback)
- Pages: 336 pp
- ISBN: 0-06-065286-1
- OCLC: 49916940
- Preceded by: Camilla Dickinson

A Live Coal in the Sea, written by Madeleine L'Engle and published in 1996, is the sequel to Camilla Dickinson (also published as Camilla), one of L'Engle's earliest novels. While Camilla Dickinson was written for a young adult audience, A Live Coal in the Sea is an adult novel. It continues the story of Camilla Dickinson as a college student, her marriage, her family and the problems that follow. The story is told by an aged Camilla to her granddaughter, who is seeking answers about her family.

The title comes from a line in William Langland's Piers Plowman: "All the wickedness in the world that man might do or say was no more to the mercy of God than a live coal dropped in the sea."

== Plot summary ==
Camilla celebrates her life with friends and family when she receives a lifetime achievement award. However, her son's snide comments at the event stir up trouble, leading her granddaughter, Raffi, to demand answers about their family history. Camilla revisits her past to give Raffi the answers she seeks.

Camilla's story begins when she is an astronomy student in college. Her life has been peaceful until her mother, Rose, visits her on campus and promptly has sex with one of her professors, which Camilla accidentally sees. As she tries to get away, she bumps into a young man named Mac Xanthakos, who is volunteering at a local church, while training to be an Episcopalian priest. Mac invites Camilla in to talk and have a cup of tea, at which point, Camilla sadly explains about her mother. This event leads to a friendship between Camilla and Mac. A romance blooms between the pair but Mac suddenly pulls away. Camilla is left saddened and confused. She continues her education and devotes herself to her work. Then suddenly, Mac reappears and asks Camilla to marry him. Camilla accepts.

Mac introduces Camilla to his wonderful and wise parents. They accept Camilla as their own daughter and Camilla begins to feel like she belongs with them. She and Mac are married and Mac begins to work at a church in a small town. Camilla becomes pregnant. The happiness ends in devastation when Camilla's pregnancy ends in miscarriage. Her pain is deepened when Camilla's parents announce they are expecting another child. Camilla becomes pregnant a second time. But once again disaster strikes. Rose is in a car accident and is killed. Before she dies, doctors are able to deliver her baby by c-section. The baby, a boy, needs a blood transfusion and Rafferty attempts to donate. When doctors compare the blood types, they discover a terrible truth. The baby is not Rafferty's. The true father of the baby is unknown.

Rafferty is driven nearly insane by combined grief and anger. He begs Camilla to take the child and raise it, with the promise that he pay for all the costs of the baby. She and Mac agree to raise the baby and name it Artaxias, who is quickly nicknamed Taxi. Camilla even decides to breast feed Taxi. A few months later, their daughter is born and named Frankie. Camilla and Mac raise Taxi as their own child and as Frankie's brother. But their idyllic bliss is shattered after a few years. Red Grange, Camilla's former professor, appears and claims that Taxi is his son. He 'proves' his paternity with a letter from Rose that states that he is the father. Red gains legal rights to Taxi and takes him from Camilla and Mac.

Years pass and Camilla and Mac do not know how to move past the loss of their surrogate son. Frankie is confused by the loss of her brother and constantly prays he will come back to them. Finally Taxi is returned but only after several years have passed and Red and his second wife have been killed in a car crash. But Taxi has changed and no longer remembers Camilla, Mac or Frankie. He is angry, rude, tough and very confused about his identity. Camilla and Max do their best to raise Frankie and Taxi but the problems are endless. Taxi tries desperately to distance himself from Red Grange and his past. He longs to be Camilla and Mac's true son but is constantly reminded by the world that he is not. He frequently acts out and disrupts their home. Frankie is confused by her changed brother and pours herself into her artwork.

Camilla flashes forward to the future and explains to Raffi that nothing changed. Taxi became a soap-opera star, married and had one child, Raffi. Taxi is still hurting because of his past and still confused about his identity. Frankie still pours her emotion into her art and has become a successful artist. Although the past may be gone and over with, it is still affecting the family and their future.

Raffi accepts Camilla's story but is amazed when she accidentally discovers a missing piece in the puzzle. Red Grange was not Taxi's father. Red's son is Taxi's real father. Raffi is excited by this discovery and eagerly tells Taxi. Raffi believes her father will be happy to know that his father is not horrible Red Grange. Taxi instead lashes out and Raffi runs to Camilla for an explanation. Camilla simply says to give it time and Taxi will eventually calm. Raffi believes Camilla and despite the evidence otherwise, accepts Camilla as her one true grandmother.
