= And Both Were Young =

Book by Madeleine L'Engle

- Cover of the 1949 edition
- Author: Madeleine L'Engle
- Language: English
- Genre: Young Adult
- Publisher: Lothrop, Lee & Shepard
- Publication date: 1949 (original edition); 1983 (reissued edition with additional material)
- Publication place: United States
- Media type: Print (Hardback, Paperback)
- Pages: 240 pages (Hardback)
- ISBN: 0385292376

And Both Were Young is a novel by Madeleine L'Engle originally published in 1949. It tells the story of an American girl at boarding school in Switzerland, not long after World War II, and the relationship she develops with a French boy she meets there, who cannot remember his past due to trauma he suffered in the war.

In 1983, a revised version of the novel that restored material originally removed by the author was published under the same title, but with a new copyright.

== Plot summary ==
In the late 1940s, Connecticut teenager Philippa "Flip" Hunter is sent to boarding school in Switzerland after recovering from a knee injury sustained in an automobile accident that also killed her mother. Her father Philip Hunter, an illustrator of children's books, is planning to travel around Europe making sketches for a book on lost children, and he is also being romantically pursued by the beautiful Eunice Jackman, whom Flip dislikes, partly because Eunice suggested the boarding school. Although Flip really wants to stay with her father, he thinks it would be better for her to be in the school where she can meet more young people and he can easily visit her at Christmas and Easter. Upon arrival at the school, Flip happens to meet a local boy named Paul Laurens, in whom she confides some of her unhappiness with Eunice and with being separated from her father.

After her father and Eunice leave, Flip has trouble fitting in at the school. She misses her father and her home, is still mourning her mother, performs poorly at school athletics due to her knee injury, and does not easily make friends with her sophisticated classmates, many of whom also come from dysfunctional family backgrounds. Her classmates mock her and give her the derisive nickname "Pill". In an effort to get some private time, she visits the school chapel, but this gets her reprimanded by the administrator and laughed at by the other girls, She resorts to going for illicit walks off the school grounds, discovers that Paul lives nearby with his father, and the two make friends and begin to meet regularly. After a hazing ritual in which Flip is physically abused by the other girls and then left blindfolded, gagged and tied to a tree in the woods, she is rescued by the art teacher, Madame Perceval. Madame Perceval also finds out about Flip's secret meetings with Paul, who turns out to be her nephew, and arranges things so that Flip can visit Paul at her home and not have to break school rules. Flip learns that Paul is a war orphan who was rescued by Madame Perceval's brother-in-law and that he has lost his memory of his past due to trauma he suffered in a concentration camp. Their growing relationship is therapeutic for them both.

As time goes by, Flip's talent for art is recognized by the other girls and her confidence grows as a result of her friendship with Paul and Madame Perceval. She begins to make friends and fit in at school. When she does poorly at skiing lessons and her ski teacher expels her from the class as being unteachable, Madame Perceval notices that Flip's skis are actually too long for her and caused the clumsiness, and provides her with a properly sized pair. Paul and Madame Perceval secretly teach Flip to ski so she can surprise the other girls. Madame Perceval over time becomes a mother figure to Flip, who reminds Madame of her own deceased daughter. Madame eventually decides to leave her teaching position and work teaching art to children affected by the war. In the course of this work, she meets Flip's father.

Paul's memory is restored after an encounter with a man falsely claiming to be his father results in an accidental injury to Flip. Flip participates in the school ski meet and, when the ski teacher and her schoolmates express doubts that she can ski at all, much less race, she reveals her relationship with Paul (and eventually Madame Perceval) and how she was taught to ski. She ends up performing well at the meet, but gives up her chance to win a race because she goes back to help her friend Erna, who has hit a patch of ice and broken an ankle, and then helps the captain of the ski team get Erna down the mountain for medical help. As a result, Flip is awarded the silver cup in front of her schoolmates, Madame Perceval, Paul and her father, who has come for the occasion. Flip's happiness at seeing her father, on top of winning the cup and being in a romantic relationship with Paul, is further enhanced when romance blooms between Philip Hunter and Madame Perceval.

== Main characters ==
- Philippa "Flip" Hunter — A young girl who is being sent to boarding school against her will because of Eunice Jackman
- Philip Hunter — Flip's frequently absent father
- Eunice Jackman — A gorgeous widow who is, as Flip says, "lusting after her father"
- Paul Laurens — A French boy who has no memory of his past
- Mademoiselle Dragonet — Flip's boarding school superintendent
- Madame Perceval — Flip's art teacher, and also Paul's aunt by adoption
- Erna — One of Flip's friends at the school

== Themes ==
And Both Were Young is loosely based upon L'Engle's own experiences in boarding school. Philippa "Flip" Hunter's story also closely parallels that of young pianist Katherine Forrester in L'Engle's 1945 novel The Small Rain.

== Title ==
The title is taken from Lord Byron's poem The Dream, which is quoted at the beginning of some editions of the novel:

These two, a maiden and a youth, were there
Gazing—the one on all that was beneath
Fair as herself—but the Boy gazed on her;
And both were young, and one was beautiful...

== Changes to 1983 edition ==
And Both Were Young is distinctive among L'Engle's works because she restored some of the original story in 1983, decades after the book's original 1949 publication. The copyright of the 1949 edition was not renewed, causing that edition to enter the public domain. The 1983 reissued edition is still under copyright.

L'Engle's first editor softened the relationship between Flip's father and Eunice Jackman, and Philippa's responses to it. In the original 1949 edition, L'Engle had also removed some material that referenced death or that the editors found sexually suggestive. The introduction to the later edition details the changes and why the author felt it worthwhile to restore her original intent.

== Crossover characters ==
Philippa Hunter is mentioned in L'Engle's 1982 novel A Severed Wasp when one of her paintings becomes a plot point.
