= Luci Shaw =

British and American Christian poet and essayist (1928–2025)

- Born: December 29, 1928; England
- Died: December 1, 2025 (aged 96)
- Citizenship: American (naturalized 1995)
- Education: Wheaton (1953)
- Occupations: Poet, essayist
- Spouses: Harold Shaw; John Hoyte (1991)

Luci Shaw (December 29, 1928 – December 1, 2025) was a British and American Christian poet and essayist.

== Life and career ==
Shaw was born in England on December 29, 1928. Her parents were medical missionaries, and she lived in Canada and Australia before moving to the United States to attend Wheaton College, Illinois. Shaw graduated from Wheaton in 1953 with high honors.

She became a naturalized citizen of the United States in 1995.

In 1988, Shaw started writing in residence at Regent College in Vancouver, Canada. She lectured on art and spirituality, Christian imagination, poetry writing, and journaling as an aid to artistic and spiritual growth.

Shaw published 10 volumes of poetry (several still in print) and numerous non-fiction books. She also edited and collaborated on multiple other works, including several with Madeleine L'Engle. Her poems are widely anthologized. Shaw usually worked in free verse, and typically her poems are quite short and less than a page. Nevertheless, in tone and content, she affiliated most readily with the transcendental poets, often finding in natural details and themes the touch of the eternal or other-worldly.

Shaw was a charter member of the Chrysostom Society, an organization of published writers which "serves the Christian community by promoting the development of quality literature".

Shaw married Harold Shaw and had five children; Robin, Marian, John, Jeffrey, and Kristin. With her husband she started a publishing house, Harold Shaw Publishers, in the basement of their home in 1972. After Harold died from lung cancer in 1986, Shaw became president of Harold Shaw Publishers. Stephen Board became owner of Harold Shaw Publishers in 1990 and sold it to Random House's WaterBrook Press in 2000.

In 1991, she married John Hoyte. They were members of St. Paul's Episcopal Church in Bellingham, Washington, where they resided until her death on December 1, 2025, at the age of 96.

== Selected works ==
=== Poetry ===
- Listen to the Green (1973)
- The Secret Trees (1976)
- The Sighting (1981)
- Postcard from the Shore (1986)
- Writing the River (1994)
- The Angles of Light (2000)
- The Green Earth (2002)
- Water Lines (2003)
- Polishing the Petoskey Stone (2003)
- What the Light Was Like (2006)
- Accompanied by Angels (2006)
- Harvesting Fog (2010)
- Scape (2013)
- Thumbprint in the Clay (2016)
- Sea Glass (2016)
- Eye of the Beholder (2019)
- The Generosity (2020)

=== Non-fiction ===
- Colossians: Focus on the Cross Fisherman Bible Studyguides (1982)
- God in the Dark: Through Grief and Beyond (1989)
- Life Path: Personal And Spiritual Growth through Journal Writing (1991)
- Horizons: Exploring Creation with Timothy Botts (1992)
- Friends for the Journey with Madeleine L'Engle (1997)
- Water My Soul: Cultivating the Interior Life; foreword by Eugene Peterson (2003)
- WinterSong: Christmas Readings with Madeleine L'Engle (2004)
- The Crime of Living Cautiously: Hearing God's Call to Adventure (2005)
- Adventure of Ascent: Field Notes from a Lifelong Journey (2014)

== Use in music ==
A number of Shaw's works have been set to music by a variety of composers:

- Alan Cline used "God in the Dark" as the basis for a cantata.
- Knut Nystedt (Norwegian composer) did a setting for "Mary's Song", sung and recorded by the Elektra Choir of Vancouver, British Columbia, Canada, and appears on their Child of Grace album.
- Alice Parker (American) set three of Shaw's poems for a song cycle.
- Frederick Frahm (American) composed settings for solo and choir for three of Shaw's poems, "Star Song", "Down He Came From Up", and "Heart Stable". Frahm also composed a cantata for Michaelmas based on Shaw's poem "Angel Vision" and a Christmas cantata (From East to West) based on texts by Shaw.
- Ed Henderson (Canadian) composed a choral setting for "Star Song".
- Roland Fudge (English) composed a choral setting for "One", "Celestial Light", and "Steadfast Taper".
