= Troubling a Star =

1994 novel by Madeleine L'Engle

- Author: Madeleine L'Engle
- Language: English
- Series: Austin Family
- Genre: Young adult
- Publisher: Farrar, Straus and Giroux
- Publication date: 30 September 1994
- Publication place: United States
- Media type: Print (Hardcover, Paperback & Audio Book)
- Pages: 304 pp (hardcover & paperback edition)
- ISBN: 978-0-374-37783-0 (hardcover edition)
- OCLC: 29668828
- LC Class: PZ7.L5385 Tr 1994
- Preceded by: A Ring of Endless Light

Troubling a Star (ISBN 0-374-37783-9) is the last full-length novel in the Austin family series by Madeleine L'Engle. The young adult suspense thriller, published in 1994, reunites L'Engle's most frequent protagonist, Vicky Austin, with Adam Eddington, both of whom become enmeshed in international intrigue as they travel separately to Antarctica. The story takes place several months after the end of A Ring of Endless Light, the novel in which Vicky and Adam first met.

Like several previous books about Vicky Austin, Troubling a Star is told in the first person, with Vicky as the narrator. It begins with Vicky stranded alone on an iceberg off the coast of Antarctica. The novel proceeds to tell in memory flashbacks how Adam's Great Aunt Serena paid for Vicky to visit Adam at Eddington Point in Antarctica, and of the interesting people and unexpected dangers she meets along the way. Despite Vicky's concerns about an apparent cooling in Adam's affection for her, it is established that their everlasting romantic relationship is quite a strong and close one.

== New Characters ==
=== Protagonists ===
- Serena "Aunt Serena" Eddington - Adam's generous great-aunt who sends Vicky off to Antarctica to visit Adam at Lenoir Station and Eddington Point.
- Adam "Cookie" Cook - Aunt Serena's chef who is going to visit his brother in The Falklands, who watches Vicky for a while until his ship arrives.
- Siri Evensen - Vicky's new friend who plays the harp and who is a teacher. She eventually finds deep and close romantic love within Benjy.
- Otto Zlatovitcx - The prince of the nation of Zlatovica, which was once part of the Soviet Union.
- Benjy Stone - A penguin expert aboard the Argosy, the cruise ship which takes Vicky to Antarctica, who strongly falls romantically in love with Siri.
- Dick and Angelique Hawkins - A couple going to Antarctica with Vicky and her friends.
- Sam White - A generous elderly man who is the oldest passenger on the Argosy, with Vicky being the youngest.
- Seth "Papageno" Cook - Cookie's brother who got maimed by a fur seal and almost died. He has a nasty scar over his eye from the experience.
- Quimby "Quim" Forrest - One of the lecturers on the Argosy.
- Leilia - A kind, elderly Alaskan woman who is a school teacher. She also is traveling on the ship, the Argosy.

=== Antagonists ===
- Jorge Maldonado - A cameraman who does secret illegal business with Jack Nessinger on the ship.
- Jack Nessinger - A Texan who does secret business with Maldonado and who escapes to Vespugia in the end.
- Esteban - Adam Eddington's guide when Adam visited the Vespugian pyramids. He is a young soldier and oboist and one of Vicky's persistent suitors. He dies in the end by a gunshot from Otto.
- Captain Nausinio - A rather stupid commander of Esteban who leaves Esteban to die on an iceberg while he escapes in a motorboat.
- Greta - One of Maldonado's stooges who comes from Germany. She was apparently Hitlers “best friend”.

== Setting ==
Part of the story takes place in Vespugia, the fictional country first mentioned in A Swiftly Tilting Planet. The events of that book have a strong bearing on the dangers Vicky faces approximately thirteen years later.

== Title ==
The title comes from "The Mistress of Vision", a poem by the English poet Francis Thompson.
