= A Ring of Endless Light =

1980 book by Madeleine L'Engle

- A Ring of Endless Light, first edition
- Author: Madeleine L'Engle
- Cover artist: Fred Marcellino (hardback)
- Language: English
- Series: Austin family
- Subject: love, death, growing up
- Genre: Young Adult, science fiction
- Publisher: Farrar, Straus & Giroux
- Publication date: 1980
- Publication place: United States
- Media type: Print (hardback)
- Pages: 324 pp
- ISBN: 0-374-36299-8
- OCLC: 5894387
- LC Class: PZ7.L5385 Ri 1980
- Preceded by: The Young Unicorns
- Followed by: Troubling a Star

A Ring of Endless Light is a 1980 novel by Madeleine L'Engle. The book follows teenager Vicky Austin as she struggles to understand life and her place in the universe while caring for her dying grandfather and finding true romantic love. The title originates from a phrase in the seventeenth-century Welsh poet Henry Vaughan's poem "The World".

== Plot summary ==
Fifteen-year-old Vicky Austin and her family are spending the summer on Seven Bay Island with her maternal grandfather, who is dying of leukemia. At the beginning of the story, Vicky attends a funeral for Commander Rodney, a family friend. Also present are the commander's wife, his sons Leo and Jacky, who own a launch boat business, and Adam Eddington, an intern at the Island's research base and friend of Vicky's brother, John.

After the funeral, Vicky encounters Zachary Gray, her boyfriend from the previous summer, whom her family does not particularly like. She soon learns that Zachary indirectly caused Commander Rodney's death; the commander had his heart attack while saving Zachary from a suicide attempt. This revelation, along with others, sets Vicky on a train of thought that continues throughout the book: the mysterious and (to Vicky) frightening topic of death. Death and the threat of it seem to loom everywhere, from news reports to the death of a baby dolphin, from the recent demise of Zach's mother in an automobile accident to Grandfather Eaton's slow deterioration.

During the course of the story, Vicky finds herself in a tangle of three romances: one with the solid, unexciting Leo, one with dark and dangerous Zachary, and one with the gentle but emotionally damaged Adam, whom she is helping with a project on dolphin and human communication (ESP) with three dolphins: Basil, Norberta, and Njord. Vicky discovers a remarkable rapport with the dolphins, an unspoken communication that borders on telepathy. Her ability extends to communicating with Adam as well, but he pulls away, unwilling to allow that level of intimacy after a devastating betrayal the previous summer.

Meanwhile, Vicky must help out at home, facing her grandfather's increasing confusion as he identifies Vicky with his dead wife. He has also been hemorrhaging, and Vicky often goes with Leo to pick up blood. There at the hospital, she meets a girl named Binnie who is sick with a type of leukemia and has seizures. Binnie's father is radically religious and is constantly disposing of the medication that controls the seizures.

One night, her grandfather starts to hemorrhage and is sent to the hospital. Vicky is on a date with Zachary and doesn't learn about her grandfather's medical crisis until they reach the dock and see Leo isn't there to pick them up. Zachary rushes Vicky to the hospital, and eventually abandons her there. As she waits in the emergency room, she is spotted by Binnie's mother, who leaves her unconscious daughter with Vicky while she goes to find a nurse. Binnie has a convulsion and dies in Vicky's arms. This latest trauma sends Vicky into a wave of darkness, an almost catatonic state in which she is only vaguely aware of reality. Vicky's parents and Leo, who are already upset because Vicky's grandfather has been bleeding internally, try unsuccessfully to comfort and communicate with her. Then she feels hands on hers – Adam's. He tells her that she "called" him (meaning with ESP) and he came.

The next day, Vicky is still in a wave of darkness. Her grandfather tells her that it is hard to keep focused on the good and positive in life, but she must bear the light, or she will be consumed by darkness. He also removes the emotional burden he placed on her earlier, when he asked her to tell him when it was time to die. Vicky can't listen, too caught up in her own misery. Finally, Adam takes her into the ocean, where Vicky's dolphin friends break through her mental darkness until she can play with them and face the light again.

== Major themes ==
The story's primary theme is death and choosing to appreciate and embrace life in the face of it. Vicky is surrounded by death during the summer of the story, and the people around her respond to it in different ways. Slowly dying from leukemia, Grandfather Eaton encourages Vicky to enjoy life while developing her talent for writing, and only gradually begins to make unreasonable demands as his own mental clarity starts to fail. Having lost his father, Leo Rodney questions his previously comfortable faith, while taking responsibility for the family's income. Zachary, whose mother died recently, alternately courts death - driving too fast, flying recklessly in a plane - and runs away from it. Adam, who holds himself responsible for the death of Joshua Archer the previous summer (in The Arm of the Starfish) because he trusted a girl, is reluctant to open his heart and risk being hurt again. In addition to the deaths of Commander Rodney and Binnie and the impending death of her grandfather, Vicky meets a dolphin researcher who nearly dies in an accident, sees a dolphin swim with her dead baby, and even worries about baby swallows in a shallow, ill-placed nest.

Related to this is the theme of religious faith in the face of death, a problem Vicky previously confronted in The Moon by Night. After observing her grandfather's joyful faith even in the midst of death and impending death at Commander Rodney's funeral, Vicky sees how Rodney's death has shaken his son Leo's once comfortable faith, and is confronted again with Zach's nihilism. After a brief period of despair after the death of Binnie, Vicky's faith is restored by the dolphins, whose songs she compares with "alien alleluias".

== Major characters ==
- Vicky Austin — The heroine of the Austin family series of novels and stories, Vicky is the first person narrator of this book and others. "Almost" sixteen years old at the time of the novel, Vicky is caught between a need for independence and her family responsibilities as she maintains somewhat troubled relationships with three very different boys, develops her talent for writing poetry, and attempts to understand how the death that seems to surround her can co-exist with the loving God her dying grandfather proclaims.
- John Austin — Vicky's scientifically-minded older brother, John, is a student at M.I.T.. Although he is primarily interested in astrophysics, he has taken a summer internship at a marine biology research station, where he has become friends with Adam Eddington. Kind and philosophical, he can help Vicky when she feels snubbed by Adam because he knows Adam's personal history and activities.
- Suzy Austin — Generally considered the beauty of the family, and talented in ways Vicky is not, Suzy is the object of a certain amount of jealousy and sibling rivalry with her sister Vicky. Suzy has wanted to be a doctor "all my life," but worries she will not be able to make the transition from medical games with dolls to caring for living patients, and that she won't be able to spend time with her dying grandfather. Suzy is fond of animals, and is interested in the dolphins at the research station. She takes a summer job helping Leo Rodney's brother Jacky with his launch business, which Vicky considers a "made-up job."
- Rob Austin — The youngest of the Austin children, Robert Austin is curious and loving, with a penchant for insightful questions and unintentional wordplay. He spends much of the book playing with a child his own age at a neighbor's house, but is nevertheless deeply affected by his grandfather's illness and Vicky's eventual breakdown. Madeleine L'Engle has acknowledged that Rob is based on her own youngest child, Bion Franklin.
- Dr. Wallace Austin, or "Wally", is the father of the four Austin children. Normally a "country doctor" in general practice, he has just concluded a year of research into the medical use of lasers in New York City, and is writing a book on the subject.
- Victoria Austin, Vicky's mother and namesake, is the daughter of Reverend Eaton, a former singer who met her husband while singing at a hospital. Her main concern in the course of the book is for her dying father, and secondarily for the rest of her family.
- Reverend Eaton, Vicky's grandfather, was a popular minister who also spent time as a missionary in Africa. He is a widower, having lost his wife Caro years before the events of Meet the Austins. He lives in a converted stable filled with books, from which he will often quote when making a religious or philosophical point. Now retired except for the occasional service, he is dying of leukemia, and sometimes confuses Vicky for Caro. At other times, he is a wise counselor to Vicky, advising her about boys, God, and death, and encouraging her in her writing.
- Zachary Gray — Extremely affluent but directionless, Zachary vacillates between his desires for redemption and self-destruction, especially in this book, his second appearance, where he half-heartedly attempts suicide as the story opens. He is described as being "gorgeous", pale-skinned, and with "velvety black" hair. He appears to have a heart condition. Charming, exciting, unpredictable, and emotionally needy, Zach brings out both the best and worst in Vicky, and eventually deserts her in a moment of crisis.
- Adam Eddington — Marine biology student who graduated from high school at 16 and already interned with at least two major authorities in the field before coming to the research station. After Kali Cutter betrays him in The Arm of the Starfish, Adam tries to keep his emotional distance from Vicky while enlisting her in his dolphin communication project. He considers himself primarily a scientist rather than a poet like Vicky.
- Leo Rodney — son of the newly deceased Commander Rodney of the local Coast Guard station, he runs a charter launch business with his brother Jacky. He had hoped to attend college, but is prepared to give it up to support his family; his mother returns to nursing instead. Less sure of eternal verities since his father's death, he reads extensively from Reverend Eaton's library and discusses God and death with Vicky, while seeking a more romantic relationship than Vicky is willing to allow him.

== Series notes ==
This is the fourth full-length novel about Vicky and her family, continuing a series that began in 1960 with Meet the Austins. (Two shorter works also take place at Christmas.) Vicky first meets Zachary in the second novel, The Moon by Night, as he follows her from campground to campground on a cross-country trip. In the next book, The Young Unicorns, Zachary is mentioned only in passing. Running concurrently with The Moon by Night is The Arm of the Starfish, a book in the O'Keefe family series that takes place the same summer as the Austins' camping trip. The Arm of the Starfish introduces its protagonist, Adam Eddington. Adam continues his relationship with Vicky Austin in the sixth and final Austin family novel, Troubling a Star.

== Awards and honors ==
A Ring of Endless Light was named Newbery Honor Book in 1981. It also won the Dorothy Canfield Fisher Children's Book Award, the California Young Reader Medal (1982) and the Colorado Children's Book Award (1983).

== TV movie ==
In 2002, the Disney Channel made A Ring of Endless Light into a made-for-TV movie starring Mischa Barton and Ryan Merriman. The film's plot veered substantially from that of the book. Vicky's parents are conveniently absent for much of the movie. Vicky's astronomy-minded elder brother John is not mentioned, and Suzy is interested in astronomy instead of medicine. Grandfather Eaton's illness is undisclosed at first, instead of being the reason the family is spending the summer with him. Other examples of death and dying are absent entirely from the movie, along with characters such as Leo Rodney and his family, and the dying child Binnie. Whole-cloth additions to the story include Adam and Zachary teaming up to save dolphins from illegal drift nets, and Vicky being pressured to study science to gain admission to an elite school.
