= Barnett National Bank Building =

The Barnett
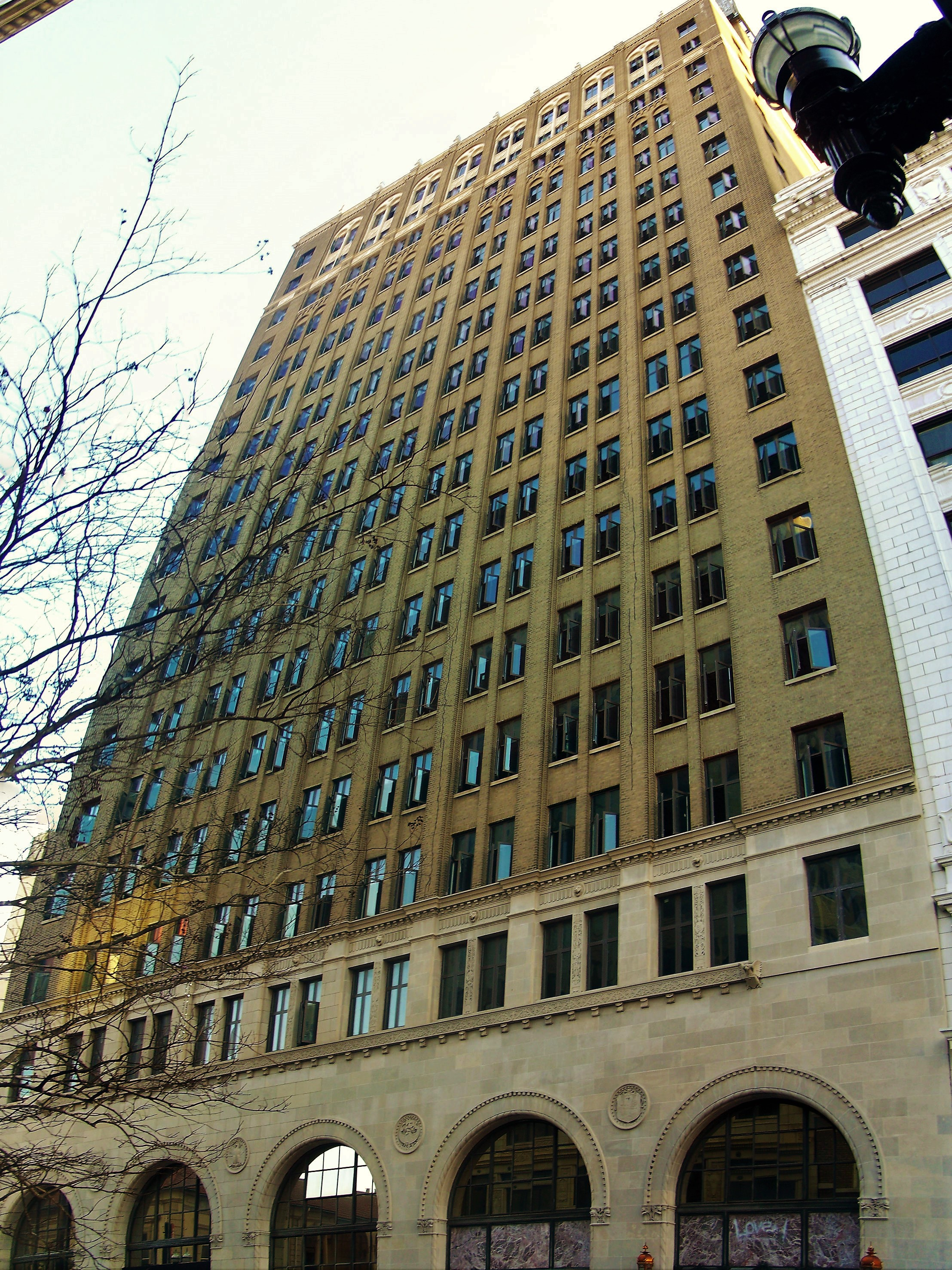

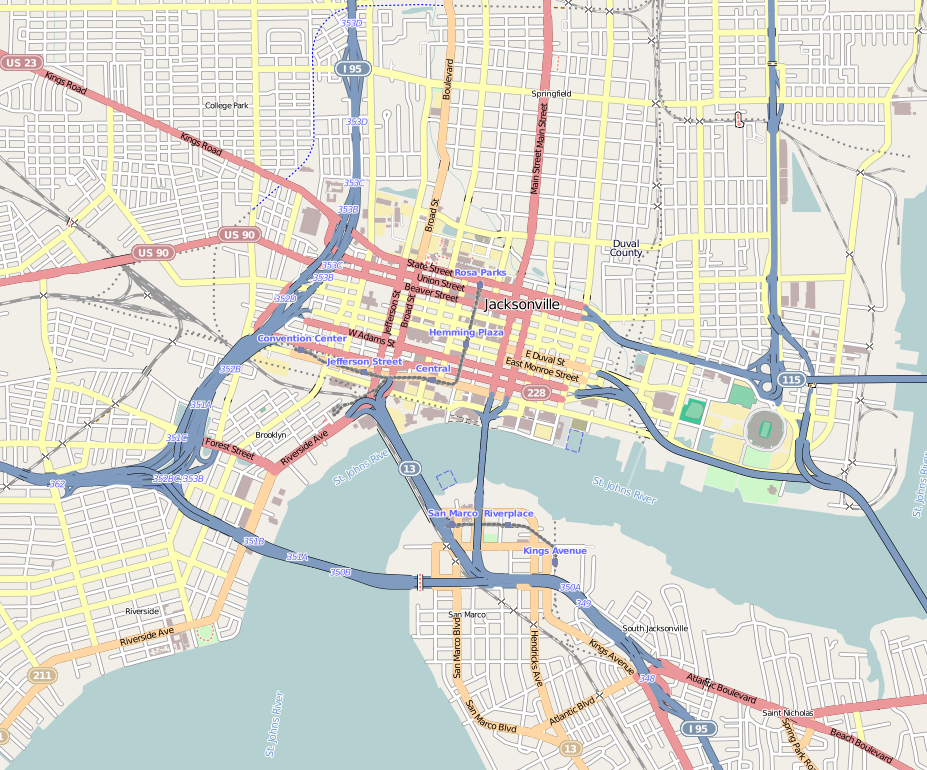
- Location within Central Jacksonville Barnett National Bank Building (Florida)
- Former names: Barnett National Bank Building

General information
- Type: Commercial offices
- Architectural style: Chicago school
- Location: 112 West Adams Street Jacksonville, Florida, United States
- Coordinates: 30.32789°N 81.65925°W
- Opening: 1926
- Owner: SouthEast Holdings LLC

Technical details
- Floor count: 18

Design and construction
- Architect: Mowbray & Uffinger
- Developer: Barnett Bank

The Barnett (originally known as the Barnett National Bank Building) is a skyscraper in the downtown area of Jacksonville, Florida, at the southwest corner of Adams and Laura streets.

== History ==
The building was erected in 1926 and was Jacksonville's tallest building at the time, surpassing the Heard National Bank Building. It was designed by architecture firm Mowbray & Uffinger for Barnett Bank. It remained Jacksonville's tallest building until the construction of the building now known as the Aetna Building in 1954. By the late 1990s it had fallen into disrepair; plans to restore and redevelop the building were proposed throughout the 2000s, but ultimately fell through. A local group led by developer Steve Atkins purchased the property, along with the Laura Street Trio, with the help of a loan from Stache Investments. On May 22, 2015, Stache Investments filed a complaint to foreclose on the building, claiming it is owed almost $3.77 million as of December 5, 2014.

Atkins' group, SouthEast Group, was able to reacquire the building with the help of Las Vegas-based The Molasky Group. The group has restored the building, aided by KBJ Architects. It is now home to the University of North Florida Center for Entrepreneurship, commercial offices, 107 apartment units, Vagabond Coffee, and a Chase Bank branch location.

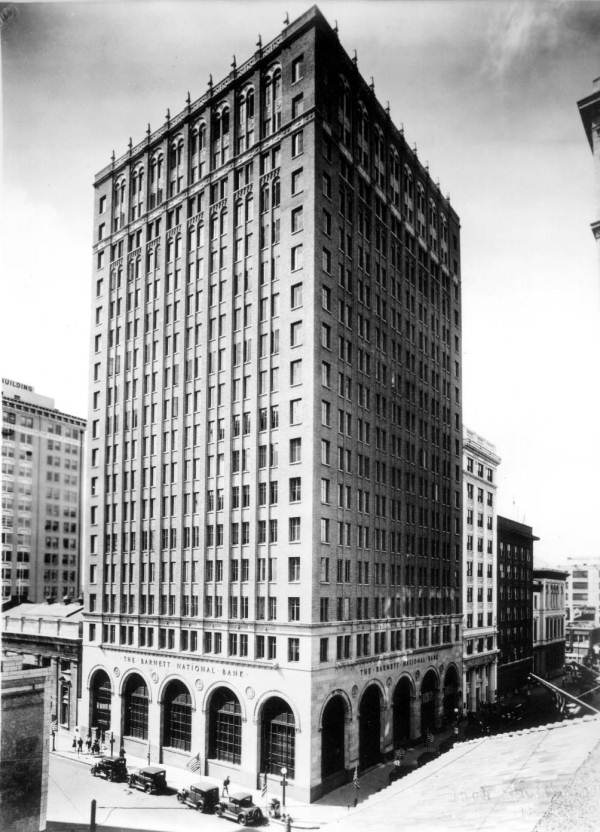
View from a nearby building in 1947

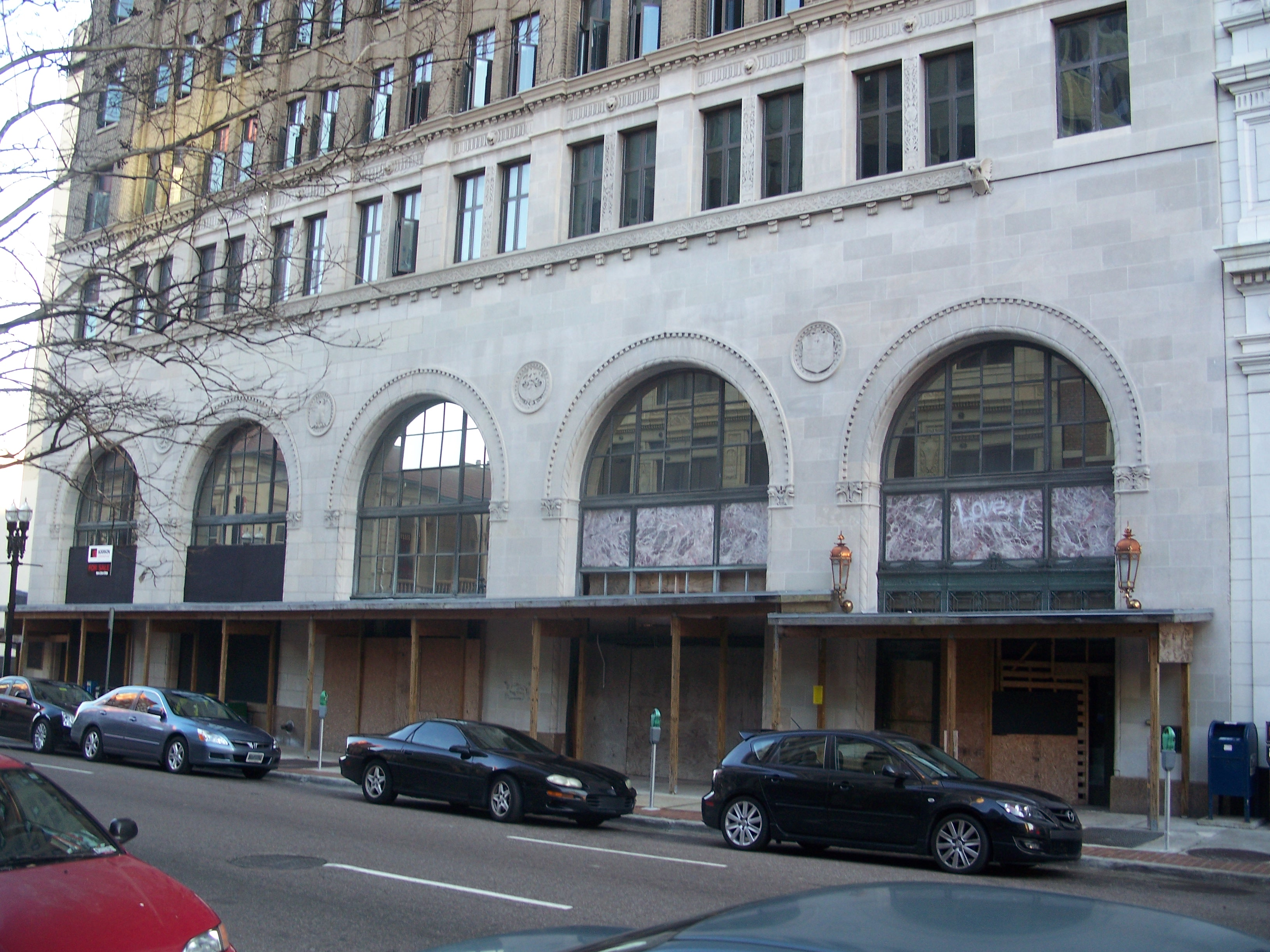
Side view in 2011

== See also ==
- Architecture of Jacksonville
- Downtown Jacksonville

Records
Preceded by Heard National Bank Building	Tallest building in Jacksonville; 1926–1954; 68m	Succeeded by Aetna Building
