= Barnett Bank =

Former American bank that was based in Florida

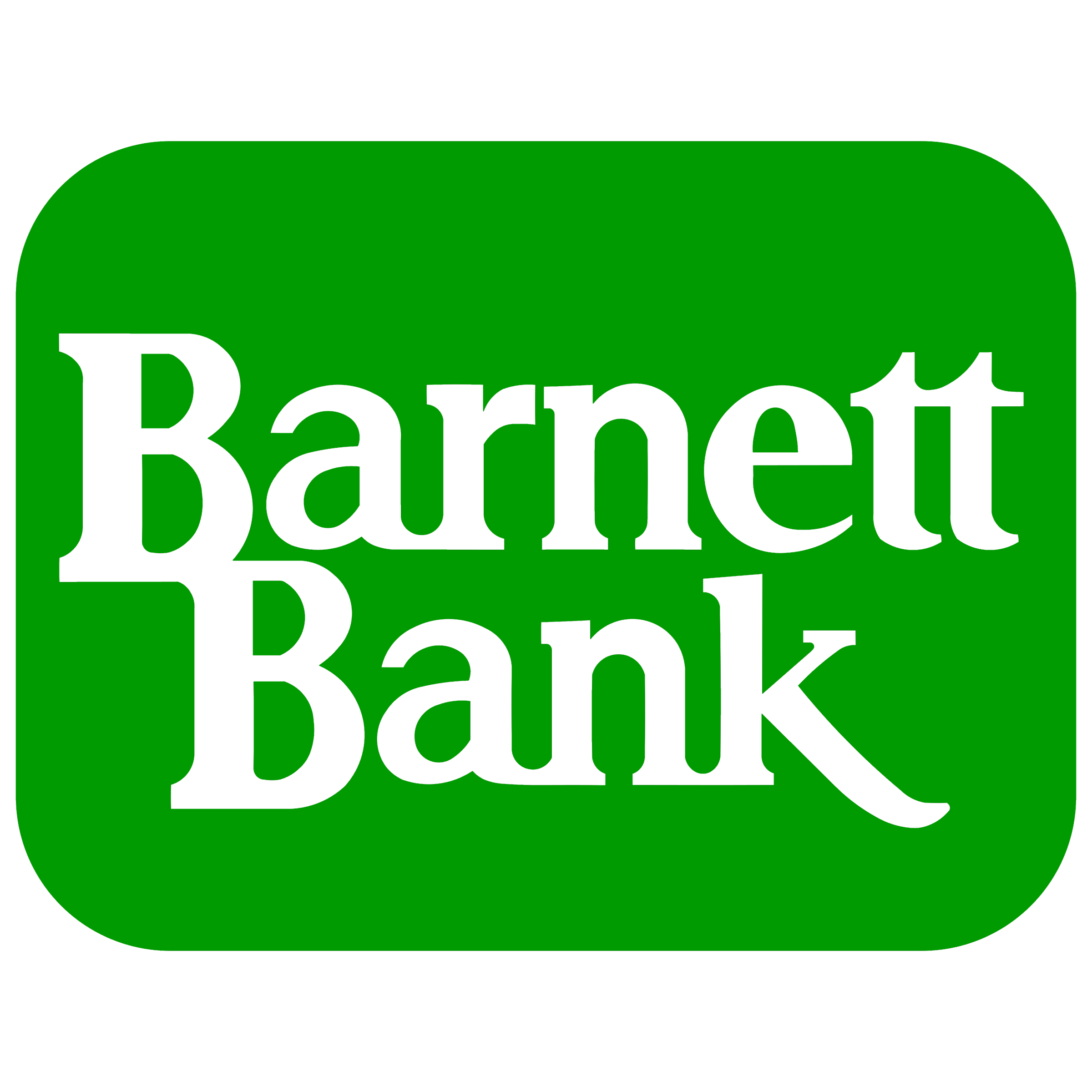
- Company type: Banking
- Genre: Financial services
- Founded: 1877
- Founder: William Boyd Barnett; Bion Barnett
- Defunct: 1997; 29 years ago
- Fate: acquired by NationsBank
- Headquarters: Jacksonville, Florida, United States
- Number of locations: 600+
- Area served: all of Florida and parts of Georgia
- Services: Financial
- Total assets: $41.2 billion

Barnett Bank was an American bank based in Florida. Founded in 1877, it eventually became the largest commercial bank in Florida with over 600 offices and $41.2 billion in deposits. Barnett was purchased by NationsBank in 1997.

== History ==
=== Foundation ===
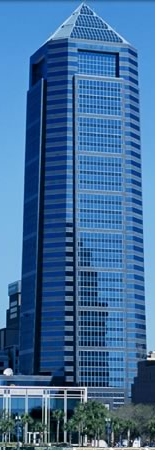
The Bank of America Tower, originally the Barnett Center, which served as the headquarters of Barnett Bank until 1997

William Boyd Barnett was a merchant and a banker in northeast Kansas when he journeyed to Jacksonville with his wife, Sarah, to visit their oldest son in 1875. Sarah Barnett's health improved during their time in Florida, so the Barnetts returned to Kansas, liquidated their assets, and permanently relocated to Jacksonville in March, 1877. Bion, their youngest son, was a senior at the University of Kansas and withdrew from school to join his parents.

In the spring of 1877, the United States was in the middle of the Depression of 1873-79, and Jacksonville already had three banks. The city's population was under 10,000 and there was no infrastructure to support a beginning tourism industry.

On May 7, 1877, Barnett opened the Bank of Jacksonville (BoJ) on the corner of Main and Forsyth with $43,000 in capital. William was president, Bion acted as bookkeeper, and one other person was hired as teller/clerk. Most Florida banks at the time were private and unregulated. In spite of being a newcomer and a Yankee, Barnett and the new institution slowly gained the people's trust, but at the end of their first year, deposits amounted to only $11,000. Undeterred, William took on his son Bion to be partner and passed along Barnett's five rules of business:

1. Follow the Golden Rule. You cannot go wrong treating the other man as you would be treated.
2. Give a man 50 cents if you can make a dollar out of him. In other words, be liberal in your dealings but always have a net profit. Do not do business at a loss.
3. If a young man is of good habits - honest, capable, saving, giving close attention to his business and making progress but lacking in capital - help him. The young man of today is the businessman of tomorrow.
4. Never make a promise you cannot and do not fulfill. Investigate carefully before granting a line of credit; once granted, there being no adverse change in your client's financial condition, fulfill your promise. Your word must be as good as your bond.
5. Watch your expense account and your losses; your profits will take care of themselves.

According to Bion Barnett, "I have never found a flaw in it. It is good advice today."

=== Fate ===
A conversation between Bion Barnett and Henry L’Engle changed the bank's fortunes. L'Engle, the Duval County Tax Collector, was annoyed because the bank holding the county's funds charged $6.25 for each transfer to New York City banks. Bion immediately offered to waive the fee if Duval County deposited their funds in the Bank of Jacksonville. L'Engle agreed, and the BoJ began to prosper. Within a year, L'Engle was appointed Treasurer for the State of Florida, and the state's accounts were transferred to BoJ. Within a few years, operating capital exceeded $150,000, and the Barnetts applied for and received a National Charter, pursuant to the National Bank Act. This allowed them to become the National Bank of Jacksonville. The institution's deposits exceeded $1 million in 1893.

=== 20th century ===
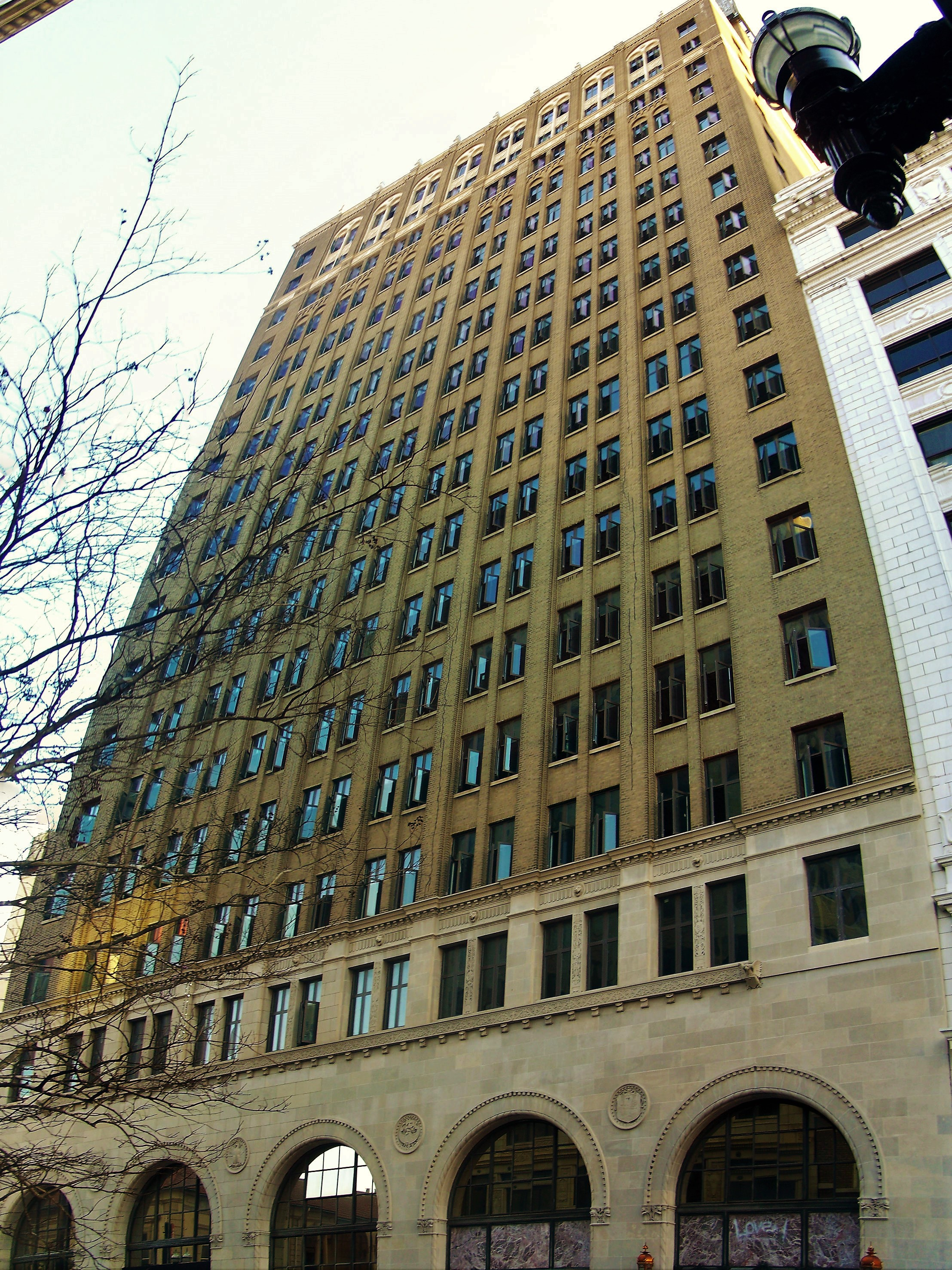
Barnett National Bank Building in 2011

The Great Fire of 1901 destroyed most of the city. National Bank of Jacksonville was the only one of the city's banks to reopen. William Boyd Barnett died September 2, 1903, and Bion renamed the institution Barnett National Bank in his father's honor.

In 1926, the Barnett National Bank Building was opened to house the company's operations and was built in the popular Chicago school style of architecture. At 18 stories, it was the tallest skyscraper in the city and remained so until 1954. The bank survived various economic downturns and crises, including the Great Depression, ultimately emerging stronger. Bion Barnett led the bank until 1952, remaining as honorary chairman until his death in 1958 at the age of 101. By then, Barnett Bank had come to be known as "Florida's Bank". The bank continued to grow with the acquisition of many more Florida banks over the next two decades.

However, under Chairman of the Board Hugh Jones, Barnett Bank was slow to become involved in the rapidly evolving interstate banking mergers of the 1970s and 80s. Though eventually Barnett did make some purchases of out-of-state banks, starting in Georgia, it did so without growing its own brand recognition. While technically, according to federal statute, one bank cannot own another bank in another state, they can both be owned by the same holding company. Barnett, like other banks, grew across state lines in this way. But unlike other such banks, Barnett did not change the names of its new holdings, keeping the Barnett name exclusively within Florida. Ultimately, this weakened the company's stock, as the perception lingered that Barnett was not a major player in the area of mergers and acquisitions. Despite its slower than average growth, the holding company built a new corporate headquarters building in downtown Jacksonville: announced in 1987 and occupied in 1990. Hugh Jones then retired in 1993. At 42 stories, the Barnett Center was the highest building in Jacksonville, and the second-tallest in Florida as of 2010. As of 2019, the reinforced concrete Barnett Center (now, the Bank of America Tower) remains the tallest building in Jacksonville.

=== Demise ===
For many years, it looked like Barnett would be the only bank of Jacksonville's "Big Three" to ignore the lure of big money from nationwide banking conglomerates. Atlantic National Bank of Florida was the first to sell out to First Union of Charlotte, North Carolina in 1985/7, and Florida National Bank merged with First Union in 1990. Barnett CEO Charles Rice publicly declared that he had no intention of selling Barnett to anyone. But in 1997, Rice, who was named Jacksonville's highest paid individual among public companies at $4.5 million (excluding stock options), offered the company up for sale, just six weeks after a month spent at a drug rehabilitation facility for treatment of alcoholism. Another big Charlotte-based bank, NationsBank, made the highest offer, and the deal was done. At the time of Barnett's demise, the company had an annual payroll of a quarter billion dollars spread among 6,800 employees. As part of the deal, Rice became chairman of NationsBank. However, less than a year later, NationsBank purchased Bank of America and took the Bank of America name, and Rice himself was demoted to vice chairman of corporate development. More than a few of those who lost their jobs found the situation ironic. After retiring in early 2001, Rice died in a swimming pool accident in December 2008.

== Volunteering ==
In the 1980s, CEO Hugh Jones began a corporate-wide program of giving back to their communities. All the bank's employees, which numbered 1,000, were encouraged to donate time to the charitable cause of their choosing. The Community Involvement Initiative resulted in over 40,000 hours of assistance to worthy projects where they lived.

== Naming dispute ==
In late 2000 financier Reid Mack secured the Florida corporate names to three former Barnett Bank entities Barnett Mortgage Company, Barnett Lending Services, and Barnett Credit Services. Bank of America fought over the intellectual property rights to the names, and over the subsequent years Mr. Mack abandoned the possible use to the names.

== Historic preservation ==
The Barnett Historic Preservation Foundation, Inc. was created in December, 1997, after NationsBank purchased Barnett. Former Barnett president Allen Lastinger joined several other bank officers to create a non-profit organization to preserve and document Barnett's historical legacy.

They acquired the company archives containing annual reports, investor presentations, press releases, correspondence, miscellaneous ledgers, videos and account books; then solicited former employees for other material, including photographs, scrapbooks, news clippings, marketing materials and employee publications. Over 70 interviews were conducted which generated 3,000 pages of transcripts that were included in an oral history component.

In 2001, the Barnett Bank collection was donated to the State Library and Archives of Florida, which also holds the Florida State Department of Banking records, as well as records from other defunct banks.
