= Madeleine L'Engle =

American writer (1918–2007)

- L'Engle in the 1980s
- Born: Madeleine L'Engle Camp; November 29, 1918; New York City, U.S.
- Died: September 6, 2007 (aged 88); Litchfield, Connecticut, U.S.
- Education: Smith College
- Occupation: Writer
- Spouse: Hugh Franklin (m. 1946; died 1986)
- Children: 3
- Writing career
- Period: 1945–2007
- Genres: Children's literature; Essays; Poetry; Christian fiction; Nonfiction; Science fiction
- Notable works: A Wrinkle in Time and sequels
- Notable awards: Newbery Medal (1963); Margaret Edwards Award (1998)

Madeleine L'Engle (/ˈlɛŋɡəl/; November 29, 1918 – September 6, 2007) was an American writer of fiction, non-fiction, and poetry. L'Engle received the Newbery Medal for her 1962 children's book, A Wrinkle in Time. She also received the Margaret A. Edwards Award from the American Library Association in 1998.

== Early life and education ==
Madeleine L'Engle Camp was born in New York City on November 29, 1918. She was named after her great-grandmother, Madeleine Margaret L'Engle, who was otherwise known as Mado. Her maternal grandfather was Florida banker Bion Barnett, co-founder of Barnett Bank in Jacksonville, Florida. Her mother, a pianist, was also named Madeleine: Madeleine Hall Barnett. Her father, Charles Wadsworth Camp, was a writer, critic, and foreign correspondent who, according to his daughter, suffered lung damage from mustard gas during World War I. (Note: In a 2004 New Yorker profile of the writer, relatives of L'Engle disputed the mustard gas story, stating instead that Camp's illness was caused by alcoholism.)

L'Engle wrote her first story at age five and began keeping a journal at age eight. These early literary attempts did not translate into academic success at the New York City private school where she was enrolled. A shy, awkward child, she struggled to gain acceptance from her peers and teachers, and she often withdrew into books and her own writing. Her favorite book at the time was Emily of New Moon, whose main character L'Engle later said she deeply identified with.

Her parents often disagreed about how to raise her, and as a result she attended a number of boarding schools and had many governesses.

The Camps traveled frequently. At one point, the family moved to a château near Chamonix in the French Alps. As Madeleine later described, the hope was that the cleaner air would be easier on her father's lungs. Madeleine was sent to a boarding school in Switzerland.

In 1933, L'Engle's grandmother fell ill, so the Camps moved near Jacksonville, Florida, to be close to her. L'Engle attended another boarding school, Ashley Hall, in Charleston, South Carolina.

When her father died in October 1936, L'Engle arrived home too late to say goodbye.

L'Engle attended Smith College from 1937 to 1941 and graduated cum laude.

== Writing career ==
L'Engle published her first novel, The Small Rain, in 1945, followed quickly by Ilsa in 1946. She published her first children's book, And Both Were Young, in 1949. Then came Camilla Dickinson, which was published in 1951.

She and her husband, Hugh Franklin, moved to Connecticut in 1952, living in a farm house and running a general store. The pressures of being a wife, mother, and part-time store clerk made it difficult for L'Engle to maintain her writing. A Winter’s Love came out in 1957, which helped bring back her career, but it did not lead to continued success. Her next book, The Lost Innocent, was continually rejected, and she later said that she had decided to give up writing on her 40th birthday (November 1958) when she received yet another rejection notice. "With all the hours I spent writing, I was still not pulling my own weight financially."

Soon she discovered both that she could not give it up and that she had continued to work on fiction subconsciously. She published Meet the Austins in 1960, which became the start of a successful series and which won praise for its innovative approach to dealing with death and grief among young audiences.

During a ten-week cross-country camping trip, L'Engle first had the idea for her most famous novel, A Wrinkle in Time. She completed the book by 1960. It was rejected more than thirty times before she handed it to John C. Farrar; it was finally published by Farrar, Straus and Giroux in 1962. Soon after winning the Newbery Medal for her 1962 "junior novel" A Wrinkle in Time, L'Engle discussed children's books in The New York Times Book Review. The writer of a good children's book, she observed, may need to return to the "intuitive understanding of his own childhood," being childlike although not childish. She claimed, "It's often possible to make demands of a child that couldn't be made of an adult... A child will often understand scientific concepts that would baffle an adult. This is because he can understand with a leap of the imagination that is denied the grown-up who has acquired the little knowledge that is a dangerous thing." Of philosophy and science, she said, "the child will come to it with an open mind, whereas many adults come closed to an open book. This is one reason so many writers turn to fantasy (which children claim as their own) when they have something important and difficult to say."

In the 1960s, 1970s, and 1980s, L'Engle wrote dozens of books for children and adults. Four of the books for adults formed the Crosswicks Journals series of autobiographical memoirs. Of these, The Summer of the Great-grandmother (1974) discusses L'Engle's personal experience caring for her aged mother, and Two-Part Invention (1988) is a memoir of her marriage, completed after her husband's death from cancer in 1986.

For L'Engle, who wrote repeatedly about "story as truth", the distinction between fiction and memoir was sometimes blurred. Real events from her life and family history made their way into some of her novels, while fictional elements, such as assumed names for people and places, can be found in her published journals.

== Personal life ==
L'Engle met actor Hugh Franklin in 1945 when she appeared off-Broadway in the play The Cherry Orchard by Anton Chekhov, and she married him on January 26, 1946. Later she wrote of their meeting and marriage, "We met in The Cherry Orchard and were married in The Joyous Season." The couple's first daughter, Josephine, was born in 1947.

The family moved to a 200-year-old farmhouse called Crosswicks in the small town of Goshen, Connecticut, in 1952. To replace Franklin's lost acting income, they purchased and operated a small general store. Their son Bion was born that same year. Four years later, seven-year-old Maria, the daughter of family friends who had died, came to live with the Franklins and they adopted her shortly thereafter. During this period, L'Engle also served as choir director of the local Congregational church.

The family returned to New York City in 1959 so that Franklin could resume his acting career. In 1960, the Franklins moved to an apartment in the Cleburne Building, located on West End Avenue on the Upper West Side of Manhattan.

Franklin died of cancer on September 26, 1986.

L'Engle was seriously injured in an automobile accident in 1991, but recovered well enough to visit Antarctica in 1992.

L'Engle's son, Bion Franklin, died on December 17, 1999, from the effects of prolonged alcoholism. He was 47 years old.

=== Religious beliefs ===
L'Engle was a Christian who attended Episcopal churches and believed in universal salvation, writing that "All will be redeemed in God's fullness of time, all, not just the small portion of the population who have been given the grace to know and accept Christ. All the strayed and stolen sheep. All the little lost ones." As a result of her promotion of Christian universalism, many Christian bookstores refused to carry her books, which were also frequently banned from evangelical Christian schools and libraries. At the same time, some of her most secular critics attacked her work for being far too religious.

L’Engle maintained strong ties to the Episcopal church throughout her career and was a librarian and writer in residence at the Episcopal Cathedral Church of St. John the Divine in New York City for nearly 30 years.

Her views on divine punishment were similar to those of George MacDonald, who also had a large influence on her fictional work. She said, "I cannot believe that God wants punishment to go on interminably any more than does a loving parent. The entire purpose of loving punishment is to teach, and it lasts only as long as is needed for the lesson. And the lesson is always love."

In 1982, L'Engle reflected on what suffering had taught her. She stated that her "lonely solitude" as a child taught her about the "world of the imagination" that enabled her to write for children. Later she suffered a "decade of failure" after her first books were published. It was a "bitter" experience, yet she wrote that she had "learned a lot of valuable lessons" that enabled her to persevere as a writer.

=== Death ===
L'Engle died of natural causes at Rose Haven, a nursing facility close to her home in Litchfield, Connecticut, on September 6, 2007, according to a statement made by her publicist the following day. She is interred in the Cathedral of St. John the Divine in Manhattan.

== Awards, honors, and recognition ==
In addition to the numerous awards, medals, and prizes won by individual books L'Engle wrote, she personally received other honors over the years. These included being named an Associate Dame of Justice in the Venerable Order of Saint John (1972); the USM Medallion from The University of Southern Mississippi (1978); the Smith College Medal "for service to community or college which exemplifies the purposes of liberal arts education" (1981); the Sophia Award for distinction in her field (1984); the Regina Medal (1985); the ALAN Award for outstanding contribution to adolescent literature, presented by the National Council of Teachers of English (1987); and the Kerlan Award (1991).

In 1985, she was a guest speaker at the Library of Congress, giving a speech entitled "Dare to be Creative!" That same year she began a two-year term as president of the Authors Guild. In addition she received over a dozen honorary degrees from as many colleges and universities, such as Haverford College. Many of these name her as a Doctor of Humane Letters, but she was also made a Doctor of Literature and a Doctor of Sacred Theology, the latter at Berkeley Divinity School in 1984. In 1995 she was writer-in-residence for Victoria Magazine. In 1997, she was recognized for Lifetime Achievement by the World Fantasy Awards.

L'Engle received the annual Margaret A. Edwards Award from the American Library Association in 1998. The Edwards Award recognizes one writer and a particular body of work for a "significant and lasting contribution to young adult literature." Four books by L'Engle were cited: Meet the Austins, A Wrinkle In Time, A Swiftly Tilting Planet, and A Ring of Endless Light (published 1960 to 1980).

In 2004, she received the National Humanities Medal.

L'Engle was inducted into the New York Writers Hall of Fame in 2011.

In a 2012 survey of School Library Journal readers, A Wrinkle in Time was voted the best children's novel after Charlotte's Web.

In 2013, a crater on Mercury was named after L'Engle.

== Legacy ==
In 1972, L'Engle and her husband, Hugh Franklin, established the Crosswicks Foundation, a family foundation.

Since 1976, Wheaton College in Illinois has maintained a special collection of L'Engle's papers, and a variety of other materials, dating back to 1919. The Madeleine L'Engle Collection includes manuscripts for the majority of her published and unpublished works, as well as interviews, photographs, audio and video presentations, and an extensive array of correspondence with both adults and children, including artwork sent to her by children.

In 2018, L'Engle's granddaughters, Charlotte Jones Voiklis and Léna Roy, published Becoming Madeleine: A Biography of the Author of A Wrinkle in Time by Her Granddaughters.

A Light So Lovely: The Spiritual Legacy of Madeleine L’Engle by Sarah Arthur was also published in 2018.

In celebration of L'Engle's centenary year, Writing for Your Life hosted the inaugural Madeleine L'Engle Conference: Walking on Water on November 16, 2019, in New York City, New York, at All Angels' Church on the Upper West Side. Katherine Paterson served as the keynote speaker.

In 2019, a collection of 43 linear feet of L'Engle's family, personal, and literary papers came to the Sophia Smith Collection of Women's History at Smith College. They had been donated by her literary estate.

At Smith College, a fellowship is available in L'Engle's name to visit and use the special collections available there. This fund provides stipends to support travel by researchers—from novices to advanced, award-winning scholars—to explore the resources available in the Smith College Archives, Mortimer Rare Book Collection, and Sophia Smith Collection of Women's History.

== Works ==
=== Works for younger readers ===
==== Chronos (The Austin Family Chronicles) ====
    1. Meet the Austins (1960), illustrated by Dennis Nolan in 1997 ISBN 0-374-34929-0
    2. The Moon by Night (1963), ISBN 0-374-35049-3
      2.5. The Twenty-four Days Before Christmas (1984), ISBN 0-87788-843-4) (Note: The two Christmas books are shorter works, heavily illustrated but not actually picture books. The events in each of these stories take place prior to the events of Meet the Austins.)
    3. The Young Unicorns (1968), ISBN 0-374-38778-8
    4. A Ring of Endless Light (1980), ISBN 0-374-36299-8 (Newbery Honor Book)
      4.5. The Anti-Muffins (1980), ISBN 0-8298-0415-3
    5. Troubling a Star (1994), ISBN 0-374-37783-9
      5.5. Miracle on 10th Street: And Other Christmas Writings (1998), a short story collection including The Twenty-four Days Before Christmas (1984) and A Full House: An Austin Family Christmas (1999)
      5.6. A Full House: An Austin Family Christmas (1999), ISBN 0-87788-020-4)
      5.7. "Rob Austin and the Millennium Bug", a short story included in the anthology Second Sight: Stories for a New Millennium (1999)

==== Kairos (The Murry-O'Keefe Family Chronicles) ====
Note: Within the Kairos series, books 1–4 of the first generation plus An Acceptable Time are jointly entitled the Time Quintet.

1. First-generation (Murry series):
    1. A Wrinkle in Time (1962; Newbery Award Winner), ISBN 0-374-38613-7
    2. A Wind in the Door (1973), ISBN 0-374-38443-6
      2.5. Intergalactic P.S. 3 (1970), ISBN 0-525-63405-3
    3. A Swiftly Tilting Planet (1978), ISBN 0-374-37362-0—National Book Award in category Children's Books (paperback). (Note: A Swiftly Tilting Planet won the award for paperback Children's Literature. From 1980 to 1983 in National Book Award history, there were dual awards for hardcover and paperback books in many categories. Most of the paperback award-winners were reprints, including this one.)
    4. Many Waters (1986), ISBN 0-374-34796-4
  1. Second-generation (O'Keefe series):
    1. The Arm of the Starfish (1965), ISBN 0-374-30396-7
    2. Dragons in the Waters (1976), ISBN 0-374-31868-9
    3. A House Like a Lotus (1984), ISBN 0-374-33385-8
    4. An Acceptable Time (1989), ISBN 0-374-30027-5

Stand-alone releases:

- And Both Were Young (1949), revised and reissued with new material (1983), ISBN 0-440-90229-0
- The Journey with Jonah (1967), ISBN 0-374-33927-9
- The Joys of Love (2008), ISBN 0-374-33870-1

=== Novels for adults ===
==== Katherine Forrester Vigneras books ====
1. The Small Rain (1945), ISBN 0-374-26637-9
  - Prelude (1968), no ISBN, an adaptation of the first half of The Small Rain
2. A Severed Wasp (1982), ISBN 0-374-26131-8

==== Camilla Dickinson books ====
1. Camilla Dickinson (1951), later republished in slightly different form as Camilla (1965), novel of young adult, ISBN 0-440-01020-9
2. A Live Coal in the Sea (1996), ISBN 0-374-18989-7

==== Stand-alones ====
- Ilsa (1946), ISBN 9-781504-049443
- A Winter's Love (1957), ISBN 0-345-30644-9
- The Love Letters (1966), revised and reissued as Love Letters (2000), ISBN 0-87788-528-1
- The Other Side of the Sun (1971), ISBN 0-87788-615-6
- Certain Women (1992), ISBN 0-374-12025-0

Note: Some ISBNs given are for later paperback editions, since no such numbering existed when L'Engle's earlier titles were published in hardcover.

=== Children's books ===
Picture books:

- Dance in the Desert (1969), ISBN 0-374-41684-2
- The Glorious Impossible (1990), ISBN 0-671-68690-9
- The Other Dog (2001), ISBN 1-58717-040-X
- A Book, Too, Can Be a Star (2022), a picture book biography of Madeleine L'Engle

=== Short stories ===
Collections:

- The Sphinx at Dawn: Two Stories (1982), collection of two short stories:
  "Pakko's Camel", "The Sphinx at Dawn"
- 101st Miracle: Early Short Stories by Madeleine L'Engle (1999), collection of 12 short stories: ISBN 1-88091-343-7
  "Poor Little Saturday", "Six Good People", and more. (Although there is an ISBN listed, there is no record of this title ever being published.)
- The Moment of Tenderness (2020), collection of 18 short stories

=== Poems ===
Collections:

- The Weather of the Heart: Selected Poems (1978)
- Wintersong: Christmas Readings (1996, with Luci Shaw), ISBN 1-57383-332-0
- Mothers And Daughters (1997), ISBN 1-89683-605-4
- The Ordering of Love: The New and Collected Poems of Madeleine L'Engle (2005), collection of nearly 200 poems, including 18 that have never before been published: ISBN 0-87788-086-7
  "Lines Scribbled on an Envelope", "The Weather of the Heart", "A Cry Like a Bell", and more

=== Plays ===
- 18 Washington Square South: A Comedy in One Act (1944)

=== Non-fiction ===
Autobiographies and memoirs

Crosswicks Journals series:

1. A Circle of Quiet (1972), ISBN 0-374-12374-8
2. The Summer of the Great-grandmother (1974), ISBN 0-374-27174-7
3. The Irrational Season (1977), ISBN 0-374-17733-3
4. Two-Part Invention: The Story of a Marriage (1988), ISBN 0-374-28020-7 (U.K. and Australia title: From This Day Forward)

Stand-alones:

- Glimpses of Grace: Daily Thoughts and Reflections (1996, with Carole F. Chase), ISBN 0-06065-281-0
- Friends for the Journey (1997, with Luci Shaw), ISBN 0-89283-986-4
- My Own Small Place: Developing the Writing Life (1998), ISBN 0-87788-571-0 (Although there is a ISBN for this title, there is no record of it having ever been released.)
- L'Engle, Madeleine (2001). Carole F. Chase (ed.). Madeleine L'Engle Herself: Reflections on a Writing Life. ISBN 0-87788-157-X.

Religion

Genesis Trilogy:

1. And It Was Good: Reflections on Beginnings (1983), ISBN 0-87788-046-8
2. A Stone for a Pillow (1986), ISBN 0-87788-789-6
3. Sold into Egypt (1989), ISBN 0-87788-766-7

Stand-alones:

- Everyday Prayers (1974), ISBN 0-81921-154-0
- Prayers for Sunday (1975), ISBN 0-81921-153-2
- Spirit and Light: Essays in Historical Theology (1976), ISBN 0-81640-310-4
- Ladder of Angels: Stories from the Bible Illustrated by Children of the World (1979), ISBN 0-06255-619-3
- Walking on Water: Reflections on Faith and Art (1980), ISBN 0-87788-918-X
- Trailing Clouds of Glory: Spiritual Values in Children's Literature (1985), ISBN 0-66432-721-4
- The Rock that Is Higher: Story as Truth (1993)
- Anytime Prayers (1994), ISBN 0-87788-055-7
- Penguins and Golden Calves: Icons and Idols in Antarctica and Other Spiritual Places (1996), ISBN 0-87788-631-8
- Bright Evening Star: Mystery of the Incarnation (1997), ISBN 0-87788-079-4
- Miracle on 10th Street: And Other Christmas Writings (1998), ISBN 0-87788-531-1
  Includes two short stories about the Austin Family Chronicles series.
- A Prayerbook for Spiritual Friends (1999, with Luci Shaw), ISBN 0-80663-892-3
- Mothers and Sons (2000), ISBN 0-87788-567-2

Writing

- Dare to Be Creative!: A Lecture Presented at the Library of Congress, November 16, 1983 (1984), ISBN 0-84440-456-X
- Do I Dare Disturb the Universe?: The Celebrated Speech (2012)

== Adaptations ==
A Ring of Endless Light was adapted into a telefilm in 2002.

L'Engle's A Wrinkle in Time was twice adapted into a film by Disney. A television film, directed by John Kent Harrison, premiered on May 10, 2004. When asked in an interview with Newsweek if the film "met her expectations", L'Engle said, "I have glimpsed it. ... I expected it to be bad, and it is." A theatrical film, directed by Ava DuVernay, premiered March 9, 2018.

Camilla Dickinson was adapted into a film in 2012.
