= The Young Unicorns =

1968 novel by Madeleine L'Engle

- First edition
- Author: Madeleine L'Engle
- Language: English
- Series: Austin family
- Genre: Young adult Thriller Science fiction novel
- Publisher: Farrar, Straus & Giroux
- Publication date: 1968
- Publication place: United States
- Media type: Print (Hardback & Paperback)
- Pages: 245
- ISBN: 0-374-38778-8
- OCLC: 37826409
- Preceded by: The Moon by Night
- Followed by: A Ring of Endless Light

The Young Unicorns (1968), ISBN 0-374-38778-8) is the title of a young adult suspense novel by American writer Madeleine L'Engle. It is the third novel about the Austin family, taking place between the events of The Moon by Night (1963) and A Ring of Endless Light (1980). Unlike those two novels and Meet the Austins (1960), it does not center on Vicky Austin specifically, but on a family friend, Josiah "Dave" Davidson.

== Plot summary ==
As the story opens, the Austin family has settled in a New York City apartment after the events of The Moon by Night, and made some friends; blind young pianist Emily Gregory and Josiah "Dave" Davidson, who helps Emily get around. Emily is studying under the tutelage of the passionate, leonine Emmanuel Theotocopulous, better known as Mr. Theo. Canon Tallis, newly arrived at the Cathedral of Saint John the Divine after the events of The Arm of the Starfish, meets the Austin children and their friends just as they encounter an anachronistic Genie in a junk shop. Tallis advises and helps to protect the children as they are drawn into a mystery involving the Genie, a street gang called the Alphabats, and the local bishop's strange behavior.

Dave is skeptical of the Genie, as is Suzy Austin, but the others are not sure. Centralized, single-minded activity on the part of the criminal Alphabats excites the suspicion of Canon Tallis, who interrogates Dave and Dr. Wallace Austin. Dr. Austin has been working on the creation and perfection of a laser-based Micro-Ray, which is so unerringly precise that it may do more than simply penetrate the corporeal. Dave was once a member of the Alphabats, but has turned from their ways. He is in denial of his past, not even talking about it. Tension builds as the 'Bats try to draw Dave into their new mischief, whose mastermind is none other than the Bishop himself. The Genie appears to be the bishop's servant, and also appears to possess a Micro-Ray.

It is revealed that the bishop has given up hope for the world; that he hopes to establish a state of control over humanity, whereby he may prevent anything he deems detrimental to its success. His Genie, Hythloday, uses the Micro-Ray to control the Alphabats. A concentrated beam from it stimulates the brain's pleasure center, giving the victim a feeling of flight. The Alphabats, hoping to receive more of this pleasure as a reward, carry out the bishop's demands.

Eventually, Rob Austin is captured. Vicky and Emily track him to the Cathedral, where they are joined by Vicky's family, Canon Tallis, and Mr. Theotocopulous. The united group expose the bishop as an imposter, being the original bishop's brother, actor Henry Grandcourt; break apart his plans to seize power; and unmask Hythloday as the dishonest scientist Dr. Hyde. The Micro-Ray is seized. Dave makes his peace with both his past and future, coming eventually to look upon those who have been with him as his family.

== Major characters ==
- Josiah "Dave" Davidson — A somewhat troubled teenager at the time of The Young Unicorns, Dave is a carpenter's son, a former gang member and choir boy, and the friend and sometime protector of the Austin children.
- Emily Gregory — The only child of widowed Dr. Gregory, Emily was blinded under mysterious circumstances. Although she is learning to adjust, the danger to her is not over.
- Vicky Austin — The protagonist of the other Austin family novels, Vicky is a budding poet and writer, the second eldest of four children. (Her elder brother John is away at college.) Often at odds with her younger sister, Suzy. Vicky has a mentor and kindred spirit in her maternal grandfather, retired minister Grandfather Eaton. At the time of The Young Unicorns, Vicky is fifteen years old, and feeling out of place and isolated in the big city, after a summer in which two boys competed for her attention. Nevertheless, she considers Emily her first real "best friend."
- Suzy Austin — Generally considered the beauty of the family, Suzy "has wanted to be a doctor ever since she could talk," and prefers science and rational explanations to fantasy and philosophizing. Being the closest to Emily in age, Suzy resents the fact that Vicky is Emily's best friend among the Austins.
- Rob Austin — The youngest of the Austin children, seven-year-old Robert Austin is curious and loving, with a penchant for insightful questions. Madeleine L'Engle has acknowledged that Rob is based on her own youngest child, Bion Franklin. In The Young Unicorns, Rob's trusting nature gets him into trouble.
- Canon Tom Tallis — Episcopal Canon. Tallis, a brusque, incisive man who is surprisingly adept at dealing with dangerous situations, appears in four novels. The character is based on L'Engle's spiritual advisor at St. John the Divine, Canon Edward Nason West.
- Emmanuele Theotocopoulos (nickname Mr. Theo) — Elderly and excitable, Mr. Theo is Emily's piano teacher, an old friend of Canon Tallis, and the cathedral's semi-retired organist. Fiercely protective of Emily and to a lesser extent the Austins, he frequently has temper tantrums which mask his love for the objects of his anger.

== Locations and sources ==
The primary setting of the book is the Cathedral of St. John the Divine, an Episcopal cathedral in New York City. Madeleine L'Engle was a volunteer librarian and writer-in-residence at this cathedral for several decades. It was early in this period in which she wrote The Young Unicorns. The Austin children and Emily attend school at St. Andrew's School, an Episcopal school that may be based on St. Hilda's and St. Hugh's Anglican School where L'Engle taught in the early 1960s. As L'Engle's own family, the Franklins, did in 1959, the Austins at the time of the novel have recently moved back to New York after years of living in rural Connecticut. Unlike the Franklins, however, who stayed primarily in New York thereafter but also retained their Connecticut farmhouse, the Austins' move to New York is temporary.

== Reception ==
At the time of the book's publication, Kirkus Reviews said, "The Young Unicorns is a kind of aggiornamento of the Austin series and The Arm of the Starfish--via cross-references and a congeries of characters--and Wrinkle...the latter because seven-year-old Rob Austin speaks with the same precocious wisdom as Charles Wallace and, in the clinch, withstands evil with the same indomitable innocence: the roles are interchangeable... Miss L'Engle envelops these melodramatics in church music and theological speculations; she also writes with an insinuating slickness: the insupportable is readable." Writing for Analog Science Fiction/Science Fact, P. Schuyler Miller said, "There's a distinct flavor of C. S. Lewis and Charles Williams to the religious side of the story. The young people are real, the plot is good, the neighborhood comes to life—in short, here is a book by an extremely capable writer which is almost science fiction." In a 2012 essay for Tor.com, American author and critic Mari Ness commented, "L'Engle's plotting is tighter here than usual... And if some of the themes of this book, her saddened observation of a rising tide of violence and hatred in the 20th century, her focus on the ability to choose between love and hate—have made regular appearances in previous L'Engle books, and will appear again, here they are woven together in a relatively engaging plot."

== Series notes ==
The Young Unicorns is unusual among the Austin family series of books in that it is written from a third-person omniscient point of view and does not have Vicky Austin as its central character. Vicky is the first person protagonist and narrator of the first two novels in the series, Meet the Austins and The Moon by Night, and of the book that follows The Young Unicorns, A Ring of Endless Light. The Young Unicorns centers largely on the Austins' new friend Dave Davidson, but also has moments from the point of view of each of the Austins (both children and adults) and of Canon Tallis. It takes place approximately six months after The Moon by Night; A Ring of Endless Light takes place the following summer.
