= Adam Eddington =

- Ryan Merriman as Adam Eddington
- First appearance: The Arm of the Starfish (1965)
- Last appearance: Troubling a Star (1994)
- Created by: Madeleine L'Engle
- Portrayed by: Ryan Merriman

In-universe information
- Occupation: Student, intern in marine biology
- Relatives: Serena Eddington (great aunt)

Adam Eddington III is a major character in three young adult novels by Madeleine L'Engle. A marine biology student, he is the protagonist of The Arm of the Starfish (1965), and a reluctant romantic love interest for Vicky Austin in A Ring of Endless Light (1980), a romantic relationship that continues in Troubling a Star (1994). He is one of three characters to have major appearances in both L'Engle's O'Keefe family series of books and her Austin family series.

== Major traits ==
Adam is highly intelligent, with a strong aptitude for science, especially marine biology, a field in which Adam's uncle and namesake made a name for himself a generation earlier. Although he describes himself as "not a churchgoer", he sang in a church choir as a child and retains a strong moral sense along with a questioning, philosophical nature. Initially somewhat naive, Adam unwisely trusts a beautiful young woman in The Arm of the Starfish, which results in the death of a friend. Because of this, Adam tries unsuccessfully to maintain an emotional distance from Vicky Austin when he meets her the following summer. He appreciates Vicky for her kind, forthright, and poetic nature and the two become close to each other anyway. By the end of his third and final appearance, Adam and Vicky appear to have formed quite a strong and close, lasting romantic relationship.

== Appearances ==
=== The Arm of the Starfish ===
The Arm of the Starfish (1965, ISBN 0-374-30027-5) introduces readers to the character and establishes much of his early history in its opening pages. A 16-year-old marine biology student, he has recently graduated from high school and plans to attend the University of California, Berkeley the following winter. The son of a physicist who teaches at Columbia University, Adam has been spending his summers with his family in Woods Hole, Massachusetts, where he has assisted elderly marine biologist "Old Doc" Didymus "ever since I was a kid". It is said that he considered himself "worldly" due to growing up in New York City, but this changes when Carolyn "Kali" Cutter exposes him to the wider world. Principled but naive, Adam has trouble determining who can or cannot be trusted in the struggle between the Cutters, the O'Keefes, and their respective allies.

=== A Ring of Endless Light ===
A Ring of Endless Light (1980, ISBN 0-374-36299-8) finds Adam working with dolphins on Seven Bay Island. Here he meets Vicky Austin and recruits her for his experiments in dolphin communication. Because of his negative experience with Kali Cutter in The Arm of the Starfish (as theorized by John Austin, Vicky's brother), Adam is initially unwilling to think of Vicky as a potential girlfriend, choosing instead to think of her as a "child". However, by the end of the book, he has become so close to Vicky that he hears her telepathically "call" him to the hospital.

=== Troubling a Star ===
Troubling a Star (1994, ISBN 0-374-37783-9) continues the story of Adam's relationship with Vicky and also the progress of his education and career in marine biology. He has the opportunity to live and work in Antarctica, where his uncle, Adam Eddington II, worked and died. (In the book, Eddington Point in Antarctica, where LeNoir Station is located, is named after Adam's uncle.)

Adam's great aunt Serena, widow of Adam Eddington I (a banker) and mother of Adam Eddington II, is introduced. She gives Vicky the trip to Antarctica that drives the story. Adam quotes William Shakespeare (especially from Hamlet) to Vicky in his letters and postcards, trying to obliquely warn her of the same kind of dangers that resulted in his uncle's murder a generation earlier. When Vicky inadvertently runs afoul of soldiers and a drug kingpin from the fictional South American dictatorship of Vespugia, she is stranded on an iceberg, but Adam finds her.
