= Vicky Austin =

- First appearance: by publication date: Meet the Austins (1960) by age: The Twenty-four Days Before Christmas (1984)
- Last appearance: Troubling a Star (1994)
- Created by: Madeleine L'Engle
- Portrayed by: Mischa Barton

In-universe information
- Alias: Victoria Austin
- Nickname: Vicky
- Occupation: Student
- Relatives: Dr. Wallace Austin and Victoria Austin, parents; brothers John and Robert; sister Suzy

Victoria "Vicky" Austin is one of Madeleine L'Engle's frequently used fictional characters, appearing in eight books and referred to in at least one more. She is the protagonist of the Austin family series of books being the first person narrator of Meet the Austins, The Moon by Night, A Ring of Endless Light, Troubling a Star, and (as a younger child) the picture book The Twenty-Four Days Before Christmas. A developing poet and writer, Vicky observes the everyday events in her large family, dates several boys, communicates with dolphins, faces the occasional mortal danger, and reflects on important issues about life and death, faith and family as she gradually comes of age.

== Character traits ==
Vicky is the second eldest of four children. With a future astrophysicist (John) for an older brother and a younger sister (Suzy) who has always wanted to be a doctor, Vicky sometimes feels at odds with others in her family with her less purposeful, more philosophical approach to life. She is intelligent and loving, an Anglican who questions her faith and considers the philosophies of others. Introverted and sensitive, she sometimes wanders off to be alone, a tendency that annoys and concerns her family in several of the books. Within her immediate family, she is closest to her younger brother, Rob, who shares her loving and questioning nature. She finds a mentor and kindred spirit in her maternal grandfather, retired minister Grandfather Eaton, who recognizes Vicky's poetic nature and encourages her to write.

== The Twenty-four Days Before Christmas ==
The Twenty-four Days Before Christmas (1984, ISBN 0-87788-843-4) is the reader's look at Vicky at the age of seven, five years before her introductory appearance in Meet the Austins. Tall and skinny, self-described as "the middle Austin and the ugly duckling", she is elated at having been chosen to play the angel in the Christmas Eve pageant at church. When a blizzard forces cancellation of the pageant and the church service, Vicky must give up her moment in the spotlight, and instead welcome the birth of her baby brother, Rob.

== A Full House: An Austin Family Christmas ==
A Full House: An Austin Family Christmas (1999, ISBN 0-87788-020-4) takes place when Vicky is eleven years old. She is a minor character in the story, which is told from the point of view of her mother, Victoria Eaton Austin.

== Meet the Austins ==
Vicky at age twelve on the 1960 cover of Meet the Austins

Meet the Austins (1960, ISBN 0-374-34929-0 for the 1997 edition) introduces Vicky at the age of twelve, just as her family goes through another major upheaval. When an airplane piloted by a family friend goes down, the Austins welcome the co-pilot's orphaned daughter, Maggy Hamilton, into their home. Vicky finds her home life disrupted as spoiled, selfish Maggy gravitates toward Suzy, causing chaos and straining Vicky's already difficult relationship with her younger, prettier sister.

== The Anti-Muffins ==
The Anti-Muffins (1997, ISBN 0-8298-0415-3) is a chapter that was omitted from Meet the Austins when it was first published, but restored to the book's later editions in hardcover and paperback. This missing chapter was published separately in 1980 as The Anti-Muffins. In it, Vicky is part of an Anti-Muffin Club, a small group of the Austin children and their friends, who believe in not judging by appearances and background. "Muffins" are a metaphor for conformity and snobbery. The chapter was apparently removed from the 1960 edition of Meet the Austins because it begins with a fight between boys who have just attended a church service and goes on to promote diversity; it also depicts the Austins as having a friend who is poor and Hispanic. "The Anti-Muffins" is Chapter Five of the post-1997 Farrar, Straus and Giroux hardcover and Square Fish paperback editions of Meet the Austins.

== The Moon by Night ==
The Moon by Night (1963, ISBN 0-374-35049-3) rejoins Vicky when, at the age of fourteen, she begins to attract the attention of teenage boys, and her life is disrupted yet again as Maggy moves away and the family prepares to move into a New York City apartment. Having grown up outside the fictional village of Thornhill, Connecticut, Vicky is unhappy and uncomfortable with the move to the big city. As her parents soften the blow by taking the family on a ten-week cross-country camping trip, Vicky meets Zachary Gray, a handsome, charming, mercurial boy who sweeps her off her feet. He follows her around the country, leaving notes and on occasion going sightseeing with the Austins. Later in the trip, Zachary has a rival with Andy Ford, who is more stable and dependable than Zach - and therefore less exciting. Vicky also struggles with her own identity issues as she begins to see herself as an individual, not just a member of the family. She is concerned about her developing looks and is even more concerned about her developing personality. Although some of her concerns are eased by Uncle Douglass in California, Vicky remains doubtful of her true identity and maturity throughout the novel.

== The Young Unicorns ==
The Young Unicorns (1968, ISBN 0-374-38778-8) takes place the following winter in New York City. Told in the third person, the novel relegates Vicky to a more secondary role than in other titles, concentrating instead on family friends Josiah "Dave" Davidson and Emily Gregory. Abandoned by Zach, and with Andy having unexpectedly moved away, Vicky feels out of place and isolated in the big city, and is surrounded by mysterious dangers involving a street gang, a genie and a dangerous new technology.

== A Ring of Endless Light ==
A Ring of Endless Light (1980, ISBN 0-374-36299-8) is set during the summer following the events of The Young Unicorns, and again employs Vicky Austin as protagonist and first person narrator. In a summer full of death and impending death, Vicky rekindles her romantic relationship with Zach, somewhat unwillingly goes on a date with Leo Rodney, is encouraged in her writing by her grandfather Eaton, who is dying, and conducts experiments in dolphin communication with Adam Eddington. Vicky again struggles with her identity and now begins to question the point of life. Her questions are fueled by Zachary's dark moods and ideas, Leo's stable and innocent ones, and theology she learns from her grandfather. Adam supports her search for truth and eventually helps her find the answers she seeks. Vicky also faces problems within her friendships. While she would like to support Zach, she does not approve of his reckless behavior and dark mindset. Before the death of his father, Vicky assumed that Leo was "a slob". Over the summer, she finds he is kind, gentle and naive but lacks the spark she is looking for in a boyfriend. Adam instantly catches her attention as he is handsome, passionate, honest, kind and everything else she is looking for. But as she becomes close to him, he pulls away and treats her like a child. Vicky eventually breaks through his barriers in order to become friends with him again. Vicky also struggles with Suzy, her younger sister. Throughout the series, Vicky has always been slightly jealous of Suzy's beauty and intelligence, but now is also concerned about Suzy's relationship with Jacky Rodney, Leo's younger brother. Her problems with Suzy are never fully solved. In the course of her work with Adam, she discovers a talent for telepathy, a way of communing with others that is called kything in L'Engle's Time Quintet. After coping with the deaths of a family friend, and Leo and Jacky's father, Commander Rodney, a baby dolphin, and with her grandfather's physical and mental decline, Vicky has a mental breakdown after a child dies in her arms while waiting at the hospital for her sick grandfather. Vicky believes these events are all indicating that Zachary was right and that life is hopeless, painful and pointless. She is roused from near-catatonia by Adam and the dolphins. As she is saved from despair, she realizes the joy and the light in life, outweighs that darkness. She also realizes that when we focus on the darkness, it can overpower us. Joined in their passion for life and joy, it appears that Adam and Vicky begin a strong and close romantic relationship. In a television movie adaptation of this novel, which aired on Disney Channel in 2003, Vicky was played by actress Mischa Barton.

== Troubling a Star ==
Troubling a Star (1994, ISBN 0-374-37783-9) is the last full-length novel about Vicky, and takes place several months after the end of A Ring of Endless Light. Again told in the first person, it begins with Vicky stranded alone on an iceberg off the coast of Antarctica. The novel proceeds to tell in flashback how Adam's Aunt Serena paid for Vicky to visit Adam at Eddington Point in Antarctica, and of the interesting people and unexpected dangers she meets along the way. Vicky is concerned with Adam's cooling interest in her but it is later revealed as his attempt to protect her.

As this is the last book in which Vicky appears, readers are left to imagine what happens to Vicky when she grows up. It is likely she becomes a writer. Whether she and Adam end up together, or if she finds love elsewhere, is unknown. From the last statements of the books, it is at least certain that Vicky and Adam remain close friends.

== Comparison with other L'Engle heroines ==
Vicky Austin is the most frequent protagonist in the fiction of Madeleine L'Engle, filling that function in four novels and two shorter works. Meg Murry is the protagonist of three books (arguably sharing that function with Charles Wallace Murry in one of these), while Polly O'Keefe, although she appears in four novels, is the protagonist in only two of them.

Like Meg, Vicky lives in an old farmhouse near a "star-watching rock" outside a village in Connecticut; both settings are based on Crosswicks, L'Engle's actual house in Connecticut. Meg and Vicky each have three siblings, and have a closer relationship with their youngest brother than with other family members. Like Meg, Vicky learns to silently communicate with a male love interest via kything.

Vicky Austin is about two years older than Polly O'Keefe, her contemporary. Adam Eddington meets first Polly and then, a year later, Vicky. Conversely, Zachary Gray meets and pursues a relationship with Polly a few years after alienating Vicky. Both heroines are caught up in international intrigue (Polly in The Arm of the Starfish, Vicky in Troubling a Star), and both are aided by Canon Tallis when their families fall victim to conspiracy and kidnapping. Vicky and Polly are each characterized as loving and somewhat naive, and each must face the death of a beloved mentor. Each of them keeps a journal, is given an international trip by an older woman to whom she is not related, and has difficulty deciding on a career path.

Vicky shares a similar personality to Madeleine L'Engle. Both share a passion for literature and poetry, and use writing to express their ideas as well as their emotions. In addition, both struggle with the problem of evil, but ultimately believe in the existence of a loving God. L'Engle once described herself as looking much more like Meg Murry but acting much more like Vicky Austin. In an author's note to a paperback reissue of the Austins series, she further acknowledged that "I share all of Vicky's insecurities, enthusiasms, and times of sadness and growth."
