= King Kong (1933 film) =

American adventure horror monster film

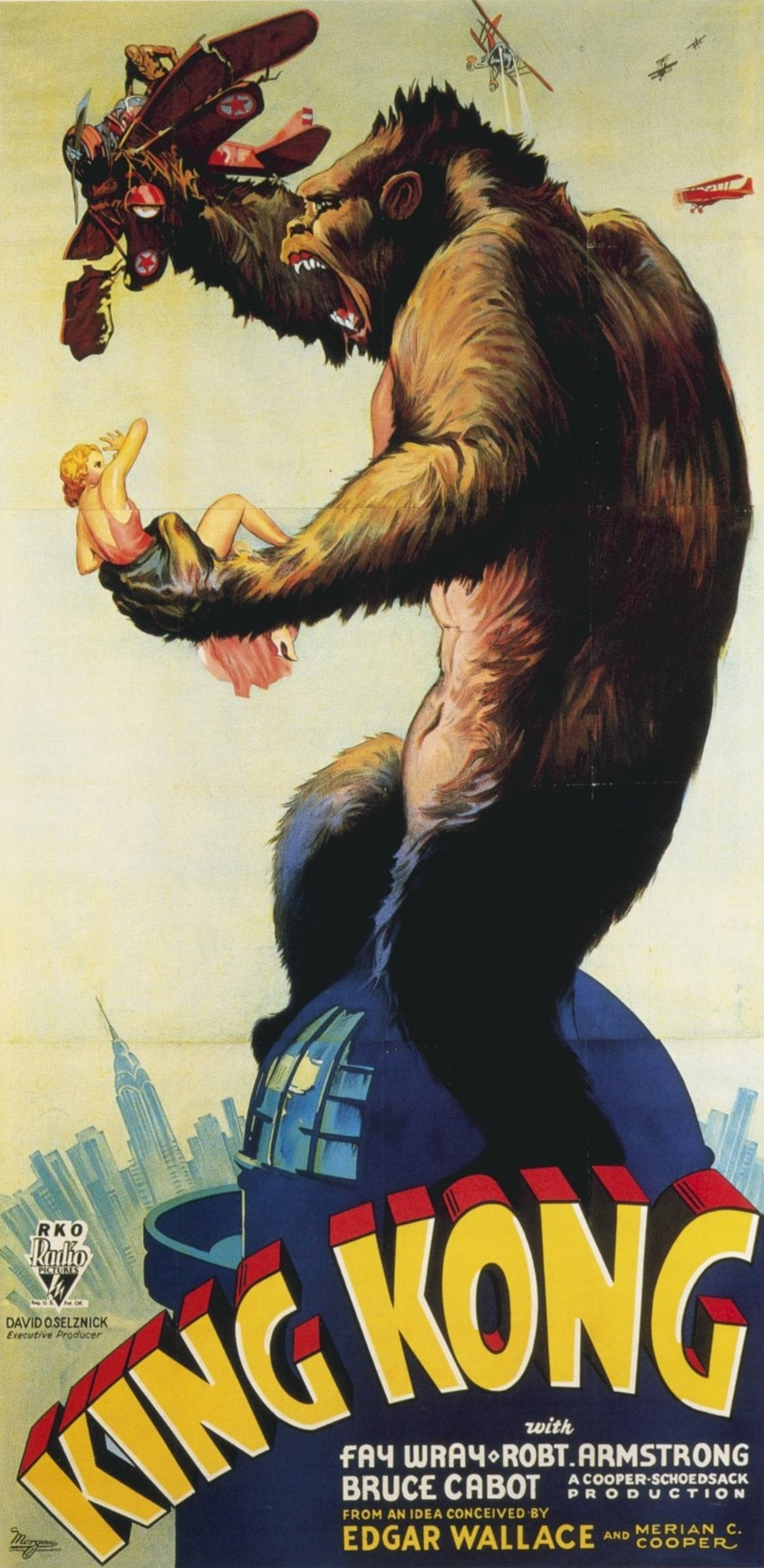
- Theatrical release poster
- Directed by: Merian C. Cooper; Ernest B. Schoedsack
- Screenplay by: James Creelman; Ruth Rose
- Story by: Edgar Wallace; Merian C. Cooper
- Produced by: Merian C. Cooper; Ernest B. Schoedsack
- Starring: Fay Wray; Robert Armstrong; Bruce Cabot
- Cinematography: Eddie Linden; Vernon Walker; J.O. Taylor
- Edited by: Ted Cheesman
- Music by: Max Steiner
- Distributed by: RKO Radio Pictures
- Release dates: March 2, 1933 (New York City); April 7, 1933 (United States)
- Running time: 100 minutes
- Country: United States
- Language: English
- Budget: $672,254.75
- Box office: $10 million

King Kong is a 1933 American Pre-Code adventure horror monster film directed and produced by Merian C. Cooper and Ernest B. Schoedsack, with special effects by Willis H. O'Brien and music by Max Steiner. Produced and distributed by RKO Radio Pictures, King Kong is the first film in the self-titled franchise, combining live-action sequences with stop-motion animation using rear-screen projection. The idea for the film came when Cooper decided to create a motion picture about a giant gorilla struggling against modern civilization. The film stars Fay Wray, Robert Armstrong, and Bruce Cabot. The story follows said gorilla dubbed Kong who feels affection for a beautiful young woman offered to him as a sacrifice.

King Kong premiered in New York City on March 2, 1933, to many rave reviews, with praise for its stop-motion animation and musical score. During its initial run, the film earned a profit of $650,000, which increased to $2,847,000 by the time of its re-release in 1952. Various scenes were deleted by censors, but they were restored in 1970. Later, in 1991, the film was deemed "culturally, historically and aesthetically significant" by the Library of Congress and selected for preservation in the National Film Registry. In 2010, the film was ranked by Rotten Tomatoes as the greatest horror film of all time and the fifty-sixth greatest film of all time. Various new editions of the film have also been released. A sequel, entitled Son of Kong, was made the same year as the original film, and several more films have been made, including two remakes in 1976 and 2005.

The film's novelization, published prior to its release, entered the public domain through a failure to include a copyright notice, making the characters and story public domain; the film's copyright is set to expire in 2029 in the US. Analysis of the film has included such topics as racial stereotypes, Ann's relationship with the other characters, and the struggle between nature and civilization.

== Plot ==
In New York Harbor, filmmaker Carl Denham, known for wildlife films in remote, exotic locations, charters Captain Englehorn's ship, the Venture, for his new project. However, he cannot secure an actress for a female role he is reluctant to disclose. In the streets of New York City, he finds struggling actress Ann Darrow and promises her "the thrill of a lifetime". The Venture sets off, during which Denham reveals their destination is an uncharted island with a mountain shaped like a skull. He alludes to a mysterious entity named Kong, rumored to dwell there. The crew arrives and anchors offshore. They encounter a village where the natives prepare to sacrifice a young woman, termed the "bride of Kong". The native chief spots the intruders and stops the ceremony. When he sees the blonde-haired Ann, he offers to trade for the "golden woman". They refuse him and return to the ship.

That night, after the ship's first mate, Jack Driscoll, admits his love for Ann, the natives kidnap Ann and offer her to Kong, a giant gorilla-like beast. Kong carries a terrified Ann away into the jungle as Denham, Jack, and some crewmen give chase. The men encounter and are attacked by living dinosaurs and eventually Kong himself, leaving Jack and Denham as the only survivors. After Kong slays a Tyrannosaurus to save Ann, Jack keeps following them while Denham returns to the village. Upon arriving in Kong's mountain lair, Jack rescues Ann while Kong mauls a Pteranodon, and they flee back to the village, where Denham, Englehorn, and the surviving crewmen await. Kong pursues and relentlessly rampages through the village. Onshore, Denham, determined to bring Kong back alive, renders him unconscious with a gas bomb.

Shackled in chains, Kong is taken to New York City and presented to a Broadway theatre audience as "King Kong, the Eighth Wonder of the World!" Ann and Jack join him on stage, surrounded by press photographers. The ensuing flash photography causes Kong to break loose as the audience flees in terror. Ann is whisked away to a high-floor hotel room, but Kong scales the building and reclaims her. He makes his way through the city with Ann in his grasp and begins climbing the Empire State Building. Jack suggests that airplanes shoot Kong off the building without hitting Ann. Four biplanes take off; seeing them arrive, Jack becomes agitated for Ann's safety and rushes inside with Denham. At the top, the planes shoot at Kong as he swats at them. Kong destroys one, but the continual gunfire slowly weakens him until he plummets to the streets below. Jack reunites with Ann. Denham heads back down and is allowed through a crowd surrounding Kong's corpse in the street. When a policeman remarks that the planes got him, Denham sadly states, "Oh no, it wasn't the airplanes. It was Beauty killed the Beast."

== Cast ==
- Fay Wray as Ann Darrow
- Robert Armstrong as Carl Denham
- Bruce Cabot as John "Jack" Driscoll
- Frank Reicher as Captain Englehorn
- Sam Hardy as Charles Weston
- Victor Wong as Charlie
- James Flavin as Second Mate Briggs
- Etta McDaniel as The Native Mother
- Everett Brown as The Native in an Ape Costume
- Noble Johnson as The Native Chief
- Steve Clemente as The Witch Doctor (cast credits misspelled as the Witch King)

== Production ==
=== Development ===
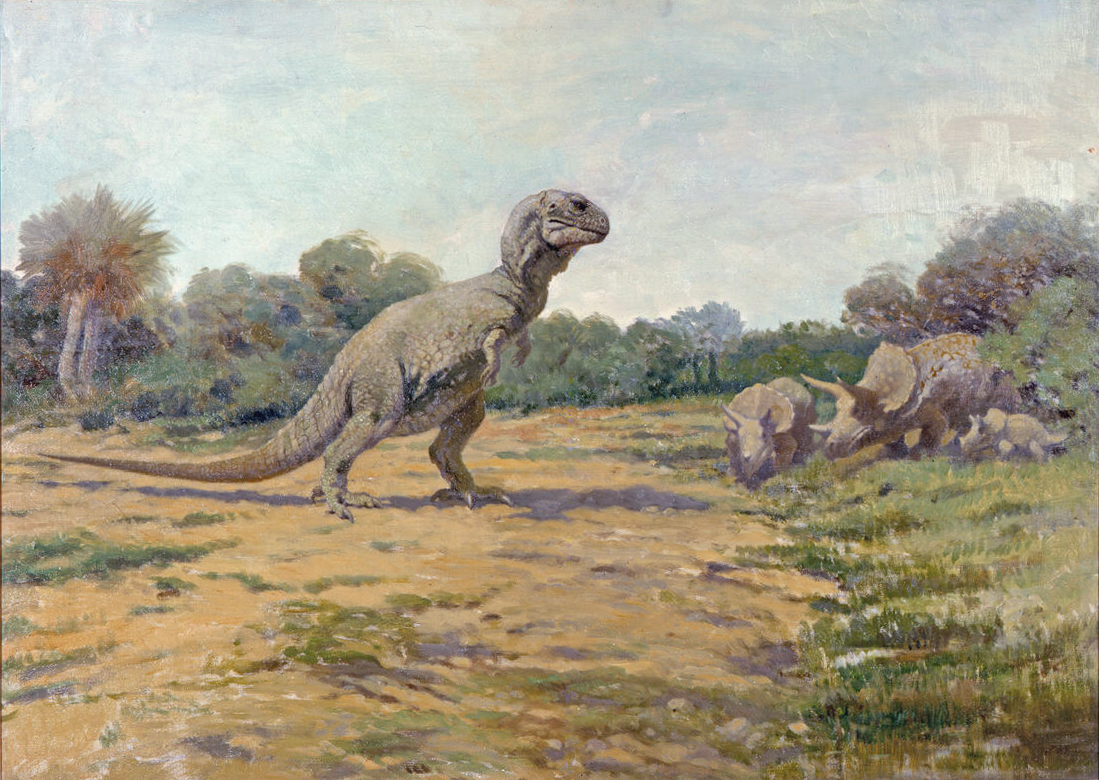
Charles R. Knight's Tyrannosaurus in the American Museum of Natural History, on which the large theropod of the film was based

King Kong co-director Ernest B. Schoedsack had earlier experience filming monkeys while directing Chang: A Drama of the Wilderness (1927), also with Merian C. Cooper, and Rango (1931), both of which prominently featured monkeys in authentic jungle settings. Capitalizing on this trend, Congo Pictures released the hoax documentary Ingagi (1930), advertising the film as "an authentic incontestable celluloid document showing the sacrifice of a living woman to mammoth gorillas." Ingagi is now often recognized as a racial exploitation film as it implicitly depicted black women having sex with gorillas and baby offspring that looked more ape than human. The film was an immediate hit, and by some estimates, it was one of the highest-grossing films of the 1930s at over $4 million. Although Cooper never listed Ingagi among his influences for King Kong, it has long been held that RKO greenlighted Kong because of the bottom-line example of Ingagi and the formula that "gorillas plus sexy women in peril equals enormous profits."

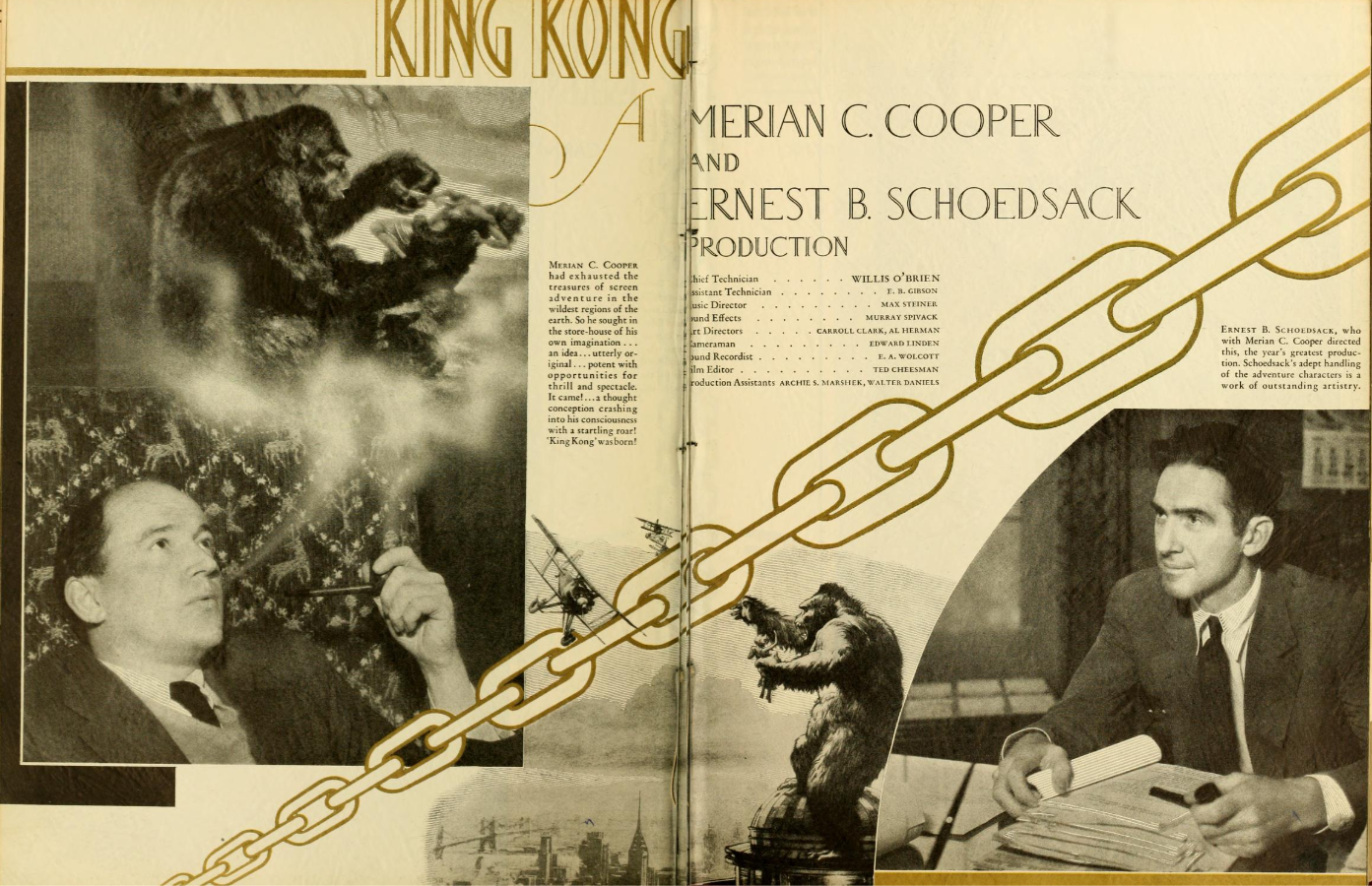
Merian C. Cooper and Ernest B. Schoedsack develop King Kong.

Since 1929, Cooper had wanted to create a film about gorillas. Inspired by the travels of his friend W. Douglas Burden, Cooper considered filming in the jungles of Komodo. He had read Burden's The Dragon Lizards of Komodo and as a result conceived the idea to film a gorilla fighting giant lizards. Cooper later remarked that this was "the most important influence" on the final film. By the time he joined RKO in 1931, Cooper decided to incorporate a "beauty and the beast" theme into the plot. The "Arabian proverb" at the beginning of the film was created by Cooper: "And lo! The Beast looked upon the face of Beauty, and it stayed its hand from killing. And from that day, it was as one dead." Initially Cooper planned to film in Africa and Komodo Island, but the idea was abandoned when RKO executives decided it would be too expensive. RKO was at risk for bankruptcy because of the Great Depression. Stop-motion animator Willis O'Brien, hearing that Cooper wanted to make a gorilla film, painted a picture depicting a large gorilla carrying a woman and gave it to Cooper. Afterward Cooper requested a test reel, which was approved by Selznick. O'Brien experimented with different scenes in the test reel. These two scenes, which were incorporated into the final film, portray a fight between King Kong and a Tyrannosaurus Rex as well as Kong shaking men off a log. The test reel was created concurrently with the production of The Most Dangerous Game. Meanwhile, Cooper hired actors and had sets built for King Kong. For live-action sequences in the jungle, Cooper utilized the set of The Most Dangerous Game. Cooper directed the live-action sequences until Schoedsack completed work on The Most Dangerous Game. Afterward Shoedsack directed the live action scenes while Cooper focused on the live action scenes that were to be combined with the already-filmed animated sequences. Marcel Delgado developed sample models of King Kong, the dinosaurs, and the people; the models did not have armatures. After about three months the test reel was complete. After studio executives approved the film for production, Cooper developed the story further. O'Brien's ideas also helped with story development. He suggested that King Kong be seen by the characters as a sort of deity.

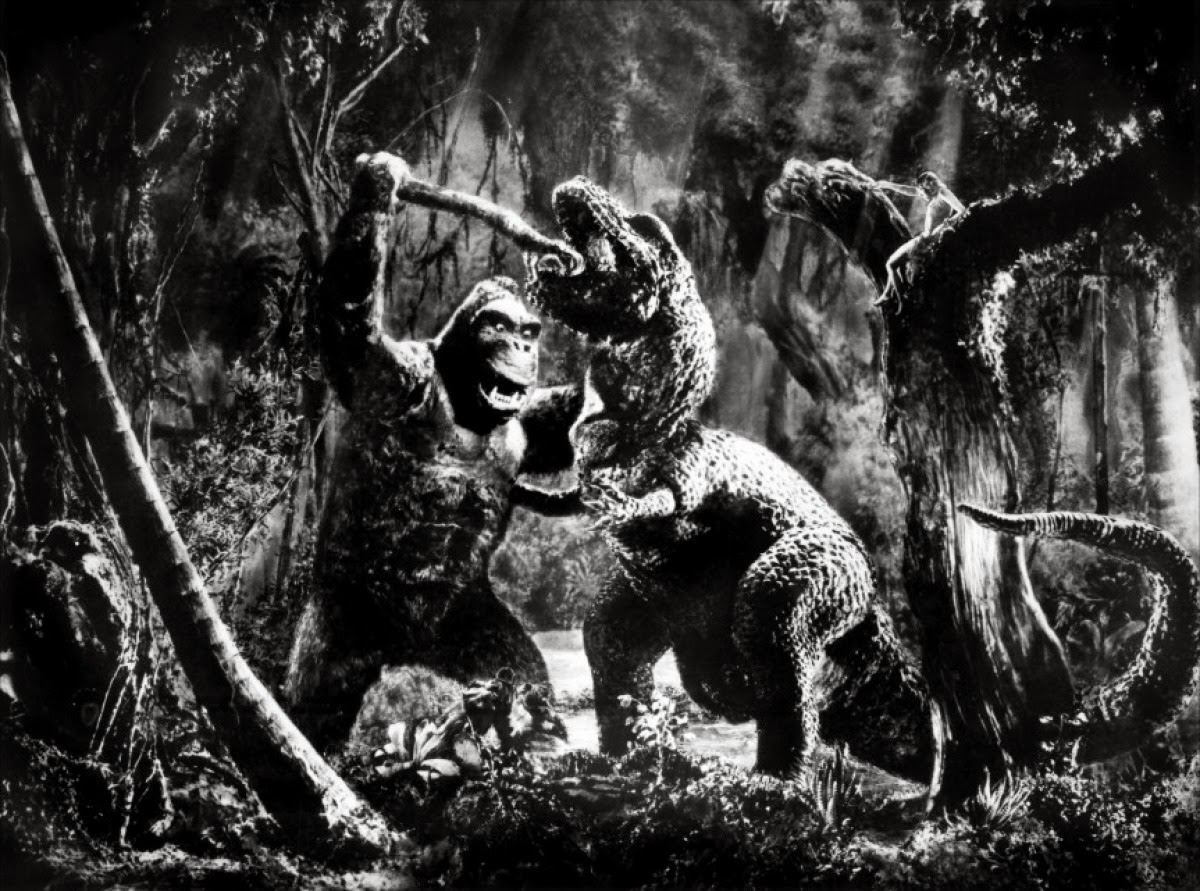
Promotional image featuring Kong battling the Tyrannosaurus, though Cooper emphasized in an interview with film historian Rudy Behlmer that it was an Allosaurus

Filming commenced without a complete screenplay. Cooper hired Edgar Wallace to write the screenplay, which he started in December 1931. Cooper told Wallace what he wanted included in the script. Wallace's draft included several instances of attempted sexual assault, which were later removed by Ruth Rose. His draft also included racial tensions between characters. While drafting he wrote, "I am hoping still to get a good horror picture without corpses, and I am certain that Kong is going to be a wow." Wallace had a rough draft ready in January 1932 and died a month later. Some of his ideas ended up in the final film, such as Kong removing Ann's clothes from her body. He also roughly outlined the New York scenes, which were similar to how they appeared in the completed film, as well as a jungle chase scene. James A. Creelman picked up work on the screenplay. In his draft he changed character roles, making Denham Ann's cruel uncle. Cooper disliked it, remarking that "The heavy is far too heavy." Creelman adapted Wallace's jungle chase scene to appear as it does in the finished film. Creelman found it difficult to meet Cooper's plot requests, feeling that there were too many fantastical elements for the film to be believable. He objected, "[T]here is certainly such a thing as reaching a limit to the number of elements a story can contain and make sense." Though he incorporated Cooper's requests, the dialogue proved to be too extensive. Cooper was unsatisfied with Creelman's work, and in June Creelman decided to quit. After some difficulty finding a replacement for Creelman, in July Cooper hired Ruth Rose, who had never written a screenplay before. She rewrote the majority of Creelman's dialogue. Though Creelman initially wrote the film's New York prologue, Rose polished it while writing most of the city scenes. Rose was able to incorporate the love story between Ann and Jack, something the other screenwriters had struggled with. Rose also added more "fairy tale-like" aspects. Upon the film's release Wallace was credited with the screenplay, as Cooper had promised to give him the credit. The studio also saw it as an opportunity to gain positive publicity because Wallace was a well-established writer.

==== Copyright concerns ====
The creators of King Kong took inspiration from other films such as Dracula and Frankenstein. The influence was heavy enough that RKO executives were worried about copyright violation. Executives discussed the potential issue with RKO's lawyers. Also among their concerns were the film's connections to Ingagi, Murders in the Rue Morgue, Journey to the Center of the Earth, and The Lost World. The other works being ruled out, Arthur Conan Doyle's The Lost World posed the most concern. Both The Lost World and King Kong concerned primitive creatures being taken to modern society. Even though Cooper argued against the similarities, the studio purchased the novel's copyright. Afterward Cooper feared that if the studio were to connect Doyle's name to the film for promotional purposes, consumers might not think the film was fresh. Eventually the Doyle estate granted the studio permission to not associate the film with Doyle's name.

=== Special effects ===
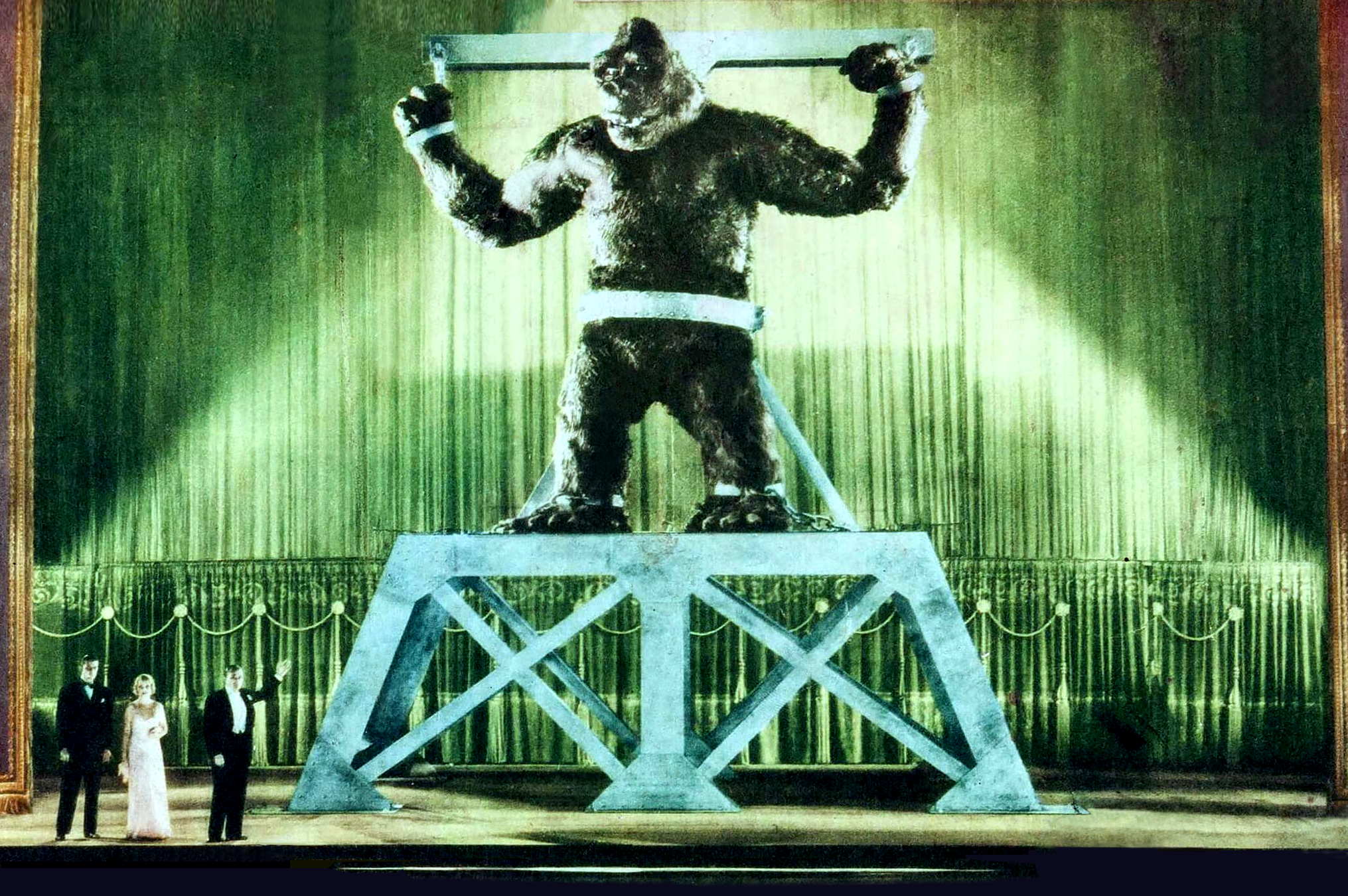
Colored publicity shot combining live actors with stop motion animation

King Kong is groundbreaking in the use of special effects, such as stop-motion animation, matte painting, rear projection, and miniatures. The prehistoric creatures inhabiting Skull Island were brought to life through the use of stop-motion animation by Willis H. O'Brien and his assistant animators, E. B. "Buzz" Gibson, Carroll Shepphird, Marcel Delgado, Orville Goldner, and Fred Reefe. The stop-motion animation scenes were painstaking and difficult to achieve and complete. The special effects crew could not leave the studio during the day because the lighting would not be consistent. The jungle scenery was created by layering glass paintings, which were created by Mario Larrinaga and Byron L. Crabbe. They were used when Denham's crew first arrives. The scene was composited with separate bird elements and rear-projected behind the ship and actors.

The most difficult task for the special effects crew to achieve was to make live-action footage interact with separately filmed stop-motion animation, making the interaction between the humans and the creatures seem believable. The most simple of these effects were accomplished by exposing part of the frame, then running the same piece of the film through the camera again by exposing the other part of the frame with a different image. This process is called a matte. The most complex shots, where the live-action actors interacted with the stop-motion animation, were achieved via two different techniques, the Dunning process and the Williams process, to produce the effect of a traveling matte.

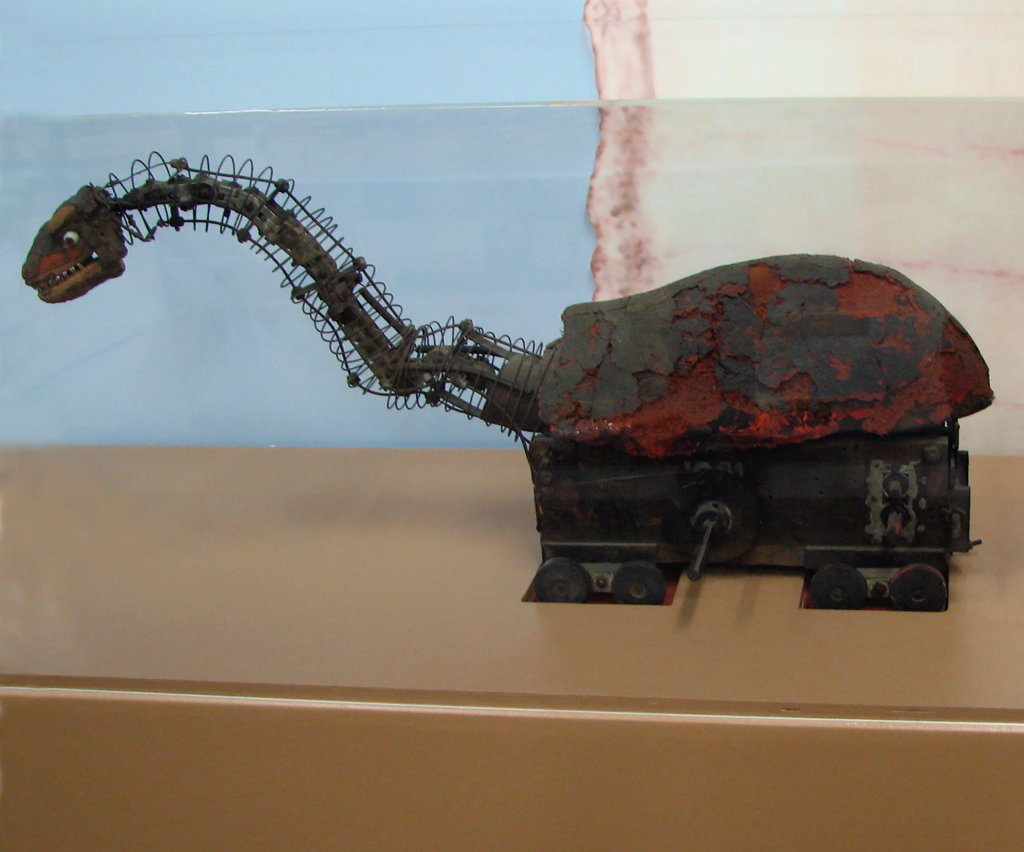
Brontosaurus stop motion armature

Another technique that was used in combining live actors and stop-motion animation was rear-screen projection. The actor would have a translucent screen behind him where a projector would project footage onto the back of the translucent screen. This was the first film for which RKO used the method. It was used in the scene where Kong and the Tyrannosaurus fight while Ann watches from the branches of a nearby tree. The stop-motion animation was filmed first. Afterward Fay Wray spent a 22-hour period sitting in a fake tree acting out her observation of the battle, which was projected onto the translucent screen while the camera filmed her witnessing the projected stop-motion battle. She was sore for days after the shoot. The same process was also used for the scene where sailors from the Venture kill a Stegosaurus. O'Brien and his special effects crew also devised a way to use rear projection in miniature sets. A tiny screen was built into the miniature onto which live-action footage would then be projected. A fan was used to prevent the footage that was projected from melting or catching fire. This miniature rear projection was used in the scene where Kong tries to grab Driscoll, who is hiding in a cave. For the scene in which Kong places Ann in a tree, Wray acted out her sequences as Kong's sequences were projected in the rear. She was unable to clearly see the projected images and had to act based on the blurs she saw. Animation for the film was completed after 55 weeks.

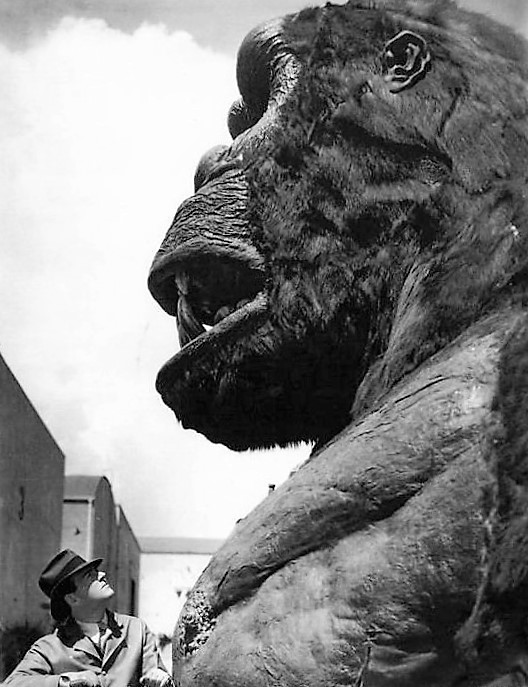
Producer Merian C. Cooper eyes the huge life-size King Kong mechanical model used in certain close-up scenes, circa 1933

Cooper, wishing to create a point of authenticity, insisted that Kong not be played by an actor in a gorilla suit. Over the years, some media reports have alleged that in certain scenes Kong was played by an actor wearing a gorilla suit. However, film historians have generally agreed that all scenes involving Kong were achieved with animated models. These models were about 14 to 18 inches (36 to 46 cm) in height. They were made of metal armatures padded with cotton, latex, and rabbit fur. The fur moved as the animators handled the models, becoming an unintentional feature of Kong. The models required maintenance after each day of filming. Closeups of Kong's face and upper body were accomplished by filming a full-size mechanical model of Kong's head and shoulders, designed by Delgado. The model, scaled to the dimensions of a fifty-foot creature, was covered with forty bearskins. Six operators were required to manipulate the eyes and mouth to simulate a living monster. A proportionally large arm and paw were also created for closeup shots of Kong holding Ann. Dinosaur models were reused from O'Brien's aborted film project Creation. Production was completed in January 1933. Production costs added up to $672,254.75, part of which included costs for Creation.

=== Sound effects and score ===
Murray Spivack developed the sound effects for the film. Kong's roar was created by mixing the recorded vocals of lions and tigers and slowly playing them backward. Spivak himself provided Kong's "love grunts" by grunting into a megaphone and playing it at a slow speed. For Kong's footsteps, Spivak stomped across a gravel-filled box with plungers attached to his feet and wrapped in foam. The sounds of Kong's chest beats are recordings of Spivak hitting his assistant, who had a microphone held to his back, on the chest with a drumstick. Spivak created the hisses and croaks of the dinosaurs with an air compressor for the former and his own vocals for the latter. The vocalizations of the Tyrannosaurus were additionally mixed in with puma growls. Spivak also provided the screams of the various sailors. Fay Wray herself provided all of her character's screams in a single recording session. Wray explained that afterward she "couldn't speak even in a whisper for days". Her screams have been used in other movies such as Son of Kong and Game of Death.

Even though funding for the film was nearly gone, Cooper and Schoedsack decided it needed an original score because they worried that Kong might be too unbelievable as a character and also did not want to use a generic soundtrack. They hired Max Steiner for the job. Steiner began composing the score on December 9, 1932, and completed it after eight weeks. The orchestra comprised 46 members, but upon recording sounded so full it is sometimes described as having 80 members. A 46-member orchestra was large compared to many other film orchestras of the time. According to Steiner, Cooper paid him $50,000 of his own money to pay for the orchestra.

Steiner decided to make the music, in his own words, "impressionistic and terrifying". During composition he took inspiration from Debussy and Ravel, specifically for the music that was to play during the ocean scene when Denham and his crew travel to Skull Island. During this scene "Boat in the Fog" begins to play; the harp reflects the waves and the stringed instruments reflect of the fog. Steiner also incorporated dissonance into the score for action scenes, such as when Kong falls to his death. Laurence MacDonald explains that this dissonance is also reflective of Debussy's compositions. The ocean scene is the first instance in which music begins to play. This is because Steiner wanted an association between music and the film's fantasy elements. Music historian Michael Slowik suggests that such an association invokes a sense of the unfamiliar, also pointing out that music is connected to the audience's need to suspend belief. Music does not play during Kong's fight with the T-rex and is replaced by animal sounds, making it the only Skull Island scene without music. Music plays in the later New York City scenes except for when the airplanes surround Kong. One of the techniques that Steiner often wrote into the score is called mickey-mousing. MacDonald dubs it "perhaps the single most noteworthy aspect of Steiner's score". According to Slowik, the score includes more mickey-mousing than other film scores of its period. He remarks that its "obsessive mickey-mousing" is reminiscent of the music that would play for a cartoon rather than for a Hollywood production. In one scene the chief of the island people walks toward Denham's group and the music aligns with his steps. The score also reflects actions happening off-screen, such as when Kong walks toward the altar where Ann is to be offered to him. Formerly, this technique had been used for silent films.

Slowik identifies three musical themes throughout the score: Kong's theme, Ann's theme, and the jungle theme. Steiner took inspiration from Wagner in creating Kong's theme. Steiner used a method called chromaticism in Kong's theme, which comprises three descending notes. According to Peter Franklin, the other themes stem from the three-note sequence in Kong's theme. "King Kong March", a Broadway-style score played during Denham's show, is an adaptation of Kong's theme, though the notes ascend rather than descend. Ann's theme ("Stolen Love") is a Viennese waltz and begins with notes similar to those in Kong's theme. Steiner eventually combined both themes in one melody just before Kong dies. Musician biographer Steven C. Smith identifies what he calls the "danger theme". It is written with four notes and is meant to sound "questioning". It first appears in "The Forgotten Island". Later, it is reworked into a major key when Driscoll confesses his love for Ann. Smith suggests that this points to what he calls "the perils of romance". Later in life Cooper expressed that "much of the reason for [King Kong's success] is because Maxie Steiner was able to create what no other man that I knew of in Hollywood at that time could". Steiner himself remarked that the film "was made for music".

Upon the film's release its score received little critical review, being overshadowed by the film's innovations in special effects. However, it received more attention as the movie became more famous in the years that followed. Christopher Palmer wrote that the score "marked the real beginnings of Hollywood music". Mervyn Cooke adds that it "almost single-handedly marked the coming-of-age of nondiegetic film music". In his book After the Silents: Hollywood Film Music in the Early Sound Era, 1926–1934, Slowik argues that King Kong's score did not influence Hollywood film scores that many music scholars think it did. He suggests that, because the movie was unusual, the score was unable to introduce an alternate way to write film scores. He also suggests that Steiner drew upon already-established patterns of Hollywood music. He writes that rather than single-handedly shaping the Golden Age of Hollywood music, King Kong is just one film among others that helped shape it. Slowik explains that the score features both "original and symphonic music", something that was not common in film scores of the time. Portions of the score were reused in Double Harness, The Last Days of Pompeii, and The Last of the Mohicans, among others. The island music appears as an orchestra scene in Jackson's 2005 remake. Over the years, Steiner's score was recorded by multiple record labels and the original motion picture soundtrack has been issued on a compact disc.

== Release and censorship ==
=== Initial release and box office ===
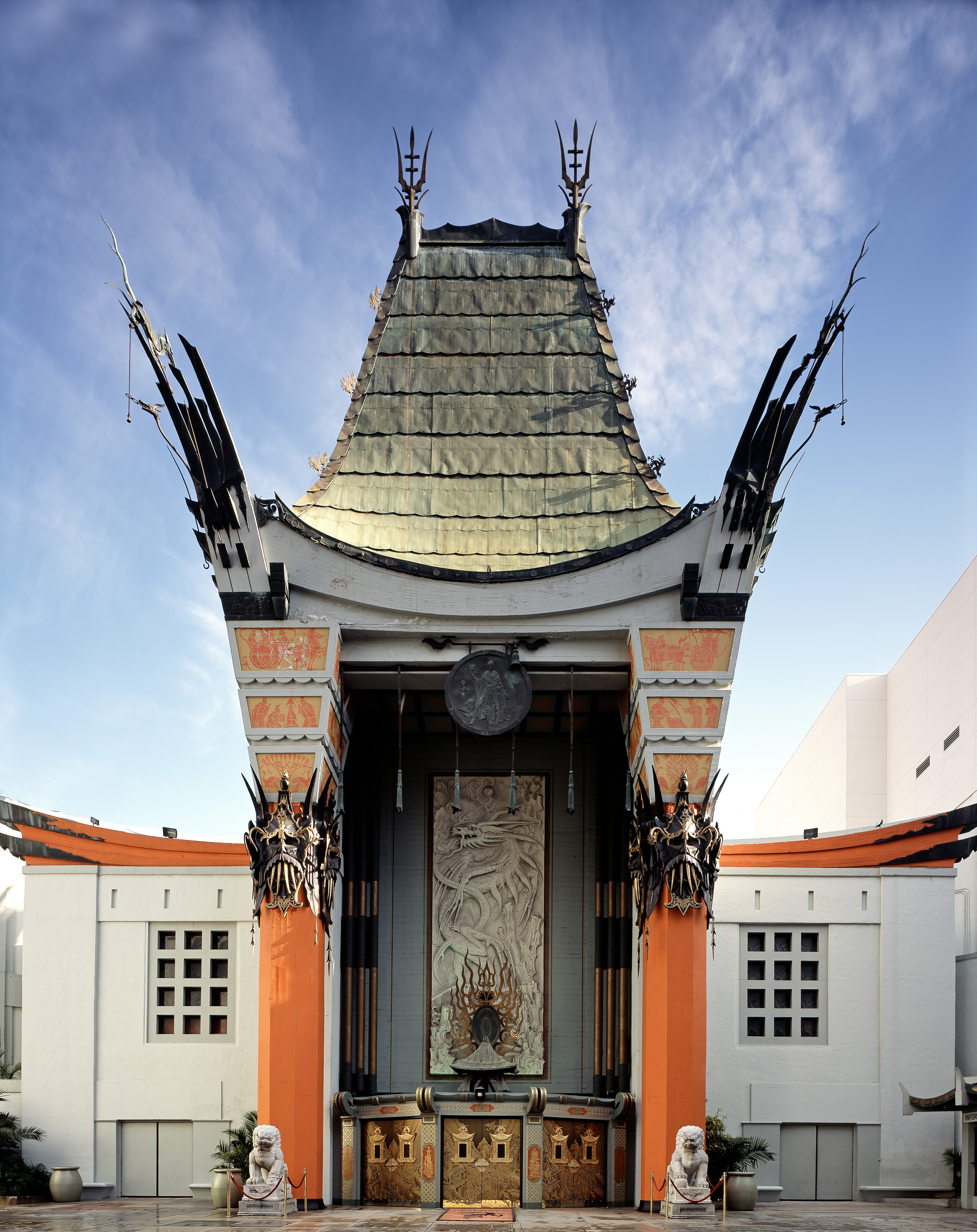
Grauman's Chinese Theatre, where King Kong held its Hollywood premiere.

King Kong’s campaign included newspaper ads, radio ads, and posters. It premiered in the Radio City Music Hall and RKO Roxy in New York City on March 2, 1933. U. S. President Franklin D. Roosevelt declared the four-day nationwide bank holiday three days after the film's premiere in New York City. The film was a box-office success and during the opening weekend earned an estimated $90,000. Receipts fell by up to 50% during the second week of the film's release because of the national bank holiday. Attendance of the film dropped within the second and third weeks of its New York release. During the film's first run it made a profit of $650,000. Before the 1952 re-release, the film is reported to have worldwide rentals of $2,847,000 including $1,070,000 from the United States and Canada and profits of $1,310,000. The Hollywood premiere was held on March 24, 1933, in Grauman’s Chinese Theatre. The screening was preceded by a performance featuring dances of Indigenous people and trapeze performances and RKO had decorated the theater's lobby so that it looked like a jungle. It was not officially released until April 7, 1933. It was re-released in 1952 following the promising re-release of Snow White. After the 1952 re-release, Variety estimated the film had earned an additional $1.6 million in the United States and Canada, bringing its total to $3.9 million in cumulative rentals in the United States. Profits from the re-release were estimated by the studio to be at about $2.5 million, which was about double of what the film earned in 1933.

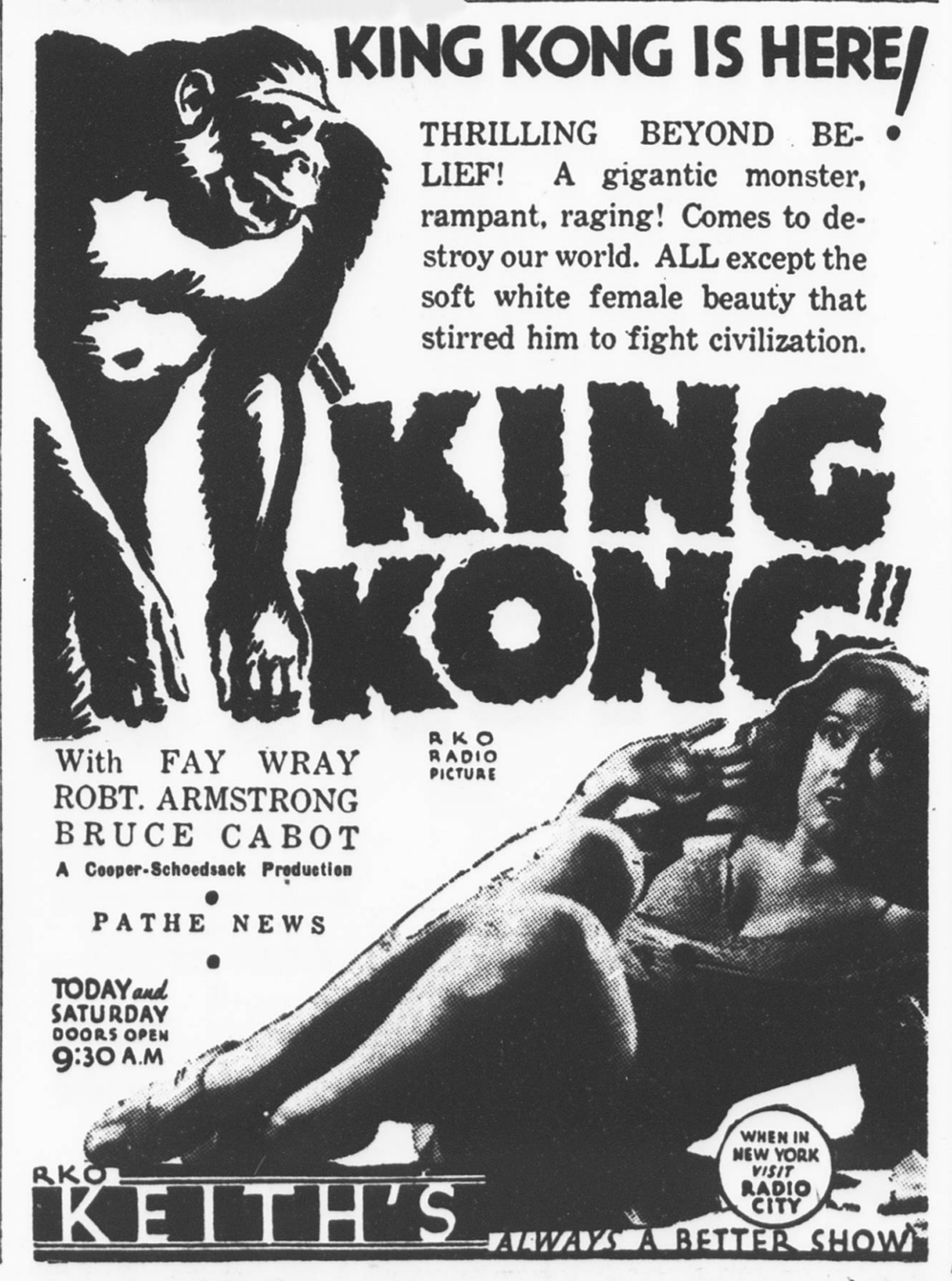
Theatrical advertisement from 1933

=== Censorship and restorations ===
The Production Code's stricter rules were put into effect in Hollywood after the film's 1933 premiere and it was progressively censored further, with several scenes being either trimmed or excised altogether for the 1938–1956 rereleases. Censors removed the scene of the Brontosaurus mauling crewmen in the water, chasing one up a tree and killing him. They also removed the scenes where Kong undresses Ann Darrow, bites and steps on people. The scene where Kong mistakes a sleeping woman for Ann and drops her to her death after realizing his mistake was also removed. An additional scene portraying giant insects, spiders, a reptile-like predator and a tentacled creature devouring the crew members shaken off the log by Kong onto the floor of the canyon below was deemed too gruesome by RKO even by pre-Code standards. Cooper thought it "stopped the story", and thus the scene was censored by the studio before the original release. Members of the preview audience also left the film early because they were concerned about the scene. The footage is considered lost, except for only a few stills and pre-production drawings. There are also claims that it was never filmed and was only in the script and novelization.

The film was initially banned in Nazi Germany, with the censors describing it as an "attack against the nerves of the German people" and a "violation of German race feeling". Shortly following its release the film was also banned in Finland for violence; the ban was released in 1939.

Trailer for the 1938 re-release of King Kong (1:32).

RKO did not preserve copies of the film's negative or release prints with the excised footage, and the cut scenes were considered lost for many years. In 1969, a 16mm print, including the censored footage, was found in Philadelphia. The cut scenes were added to the film, restoring it to its original theatrical running time of 100 minutes. This version was re-released to art houses by Janus Films in 1970. Over the next two decades, Universal Studios undertook further photochemical restoration of King Kong. This was based on a 1942 release print with missing censor cuts taken from a 1937 print, which "contained heavy vertical scratches from projection." An original release print located in the UK in the 1980s was found to contain the cut scenes in better quality. After a 6-year worldwide search for the best surviving materials, a further, fully digital restoration utilizing 4K resolution scanning was completed by Warner Bros. in 2005. This restoration also had a 4-minute overture added, bringing the overall running time to 104 minutes. The project was funded by The Film Foundation and the Hollywood Foreign Press Association. Somewhat controversially, King Kong was colorized for a 1989 Turner Home Entertainment video release.

=== Television and home media ===
After the 1956 re-release, the film was sold to television and was first broadcast on March 5, 1956. King Kong had numerous VHS and LaserDisc releases of varying quality before receiving an official studio release on DVD. In 1984, King Kong was one of the first films to be released on LaserDisc as part of the Criterion Collection, and was the first movie to have an audio commentary track included. Criterion's audio commentary was by film historian Ron Haver. The Haver commentary was available on the FilmStruck streaming service. Image Entertainment released another LaserDisc around 1993. The VHS release from Turner was a 60th-anniversary edition in 1992 featuring a front cover that had the sound effect of Kong roaring when his chest was pressed. It had orders for over 140,000 copies, with the colorized version being preferred. It also included a 25-minute documentary, It Was Beauty Killed the Beast (1992).

In 2005, Warner Bros. released its digital restoration of King Kong in a US 2-disc Special Edition DVD, coinciding with the theatrical release of Peter Jackson's remake. The restoration was funded partially by the Hollywood Foreign Press Association. The DVD release had numerous extra features, including a new, third audio commentary by visual effects artists Ray Harryhausen and Ken Ralston, with archival excerpts from actress Fay Wray and producer/director Merian C. Cooper. At American Cinematographer, Kenneth Sweeney found the extras on disc 1 lackluster for such an important release. Disc 2 included more in-depth features, with a short biographical film on Cooper, and "RKO Production 601: The Making of King Kong", produced by Peter Jackson. Disc 2 included additional interviews with many relevant people. The DVD was also sold in a limited edition with Son of Kong and Mighty Joe Young Warners issued a US digibook-packaged Blu-ray in 2010, presented in a aspect ratio of 1.37:1, and with a 1080p master upgrade over the 2005 two-disc DVD release. Rudy Behlmer wrote the accompanying 32-page booklet.

== Reception ==
=== Contemporary ===
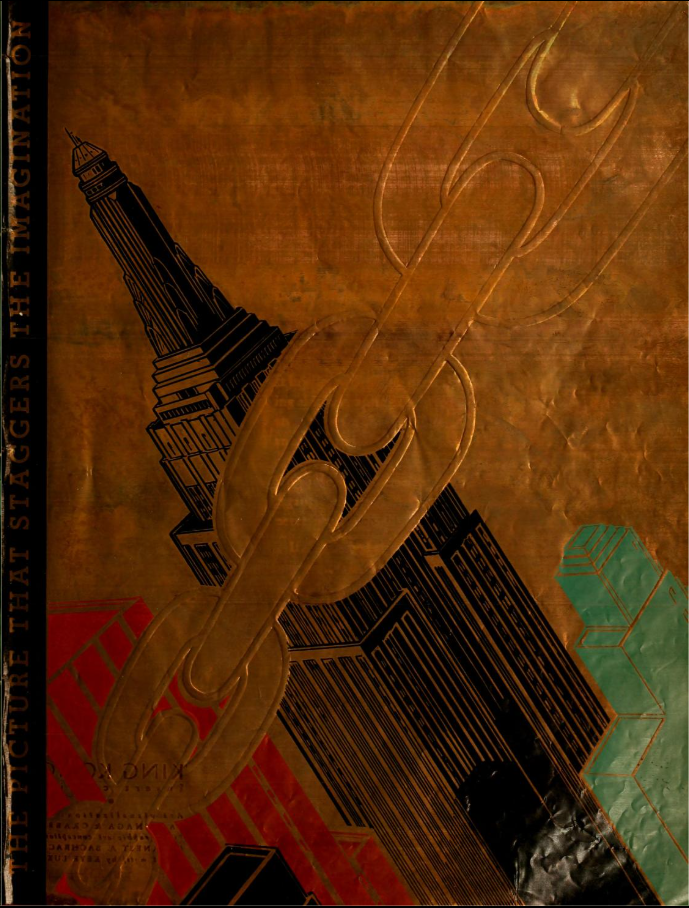
Front cover of King Kong's Los Angeles premiere program included in the 1933 edition of Hollywood Reporter.

King Kong received generally positive reviews upon its release. Meehan of Motion Picture Herald predicted it would be "one of the sensational pictures of the year", opining that "no more thrilling climax ever was filmed". A reviewer for The Hollywood Reporter claimed the film "bears all the earmarks of a winner", predicting it would make "plenty of money". Another review in the same periodical declared it was "superbly produced-acted", a "great piece of imagination, hatched in the brain of a showman for showmen". A Motion Picture Herald review by McCarthy called King Kong "imagination-stunning" and praised the "buildup of suspense", dubbing it "a showman's picture". The Chicago Tribune called it "one of the most original, thrilling and mammoth novelties to emerge from a movie studio." The New York Times gave readers an enthusiastic account of the plot and thought the film a fascinating adventure. The New York World-Telegram said it was "one of the very best of all the screen thrillers, done with all the cinema's slickest camera tricks."

The Film Daily wrote, "The picture has plenty of shocker stuff, and the terror is heightened by [Fay Wray's screaming], while the film's musical score adds its blare to keep the audience in a state of turmoil." The reviewer cautioned that "some women and children" might dislike the film's intensity. John Mosher of The New Yorker called it "ridiculous," but wrote that there were "many scenes in this picture that are certainly diverting." Joe Bigelow of Variety thought the film held "power" once a viewer got used to the "phoney atmosphere". He remarked that "a few details were too strong to swallow the picture" and the technical innovations overshadowed the plot and acting. The film's "many flaws", he added, were "overcome by the general results". Newsweek wrote that Cooper and Schoedsack were no longer "scientists" because the film was "exaggerated in its faked views of wild life".

The Hollywood Reporter included a multi-page booklet in its March issue, featuring production stills and concept sketches alongside critical praise for the film. The booklet was the program for the film's Los Angeles premiere.

=== Recent ===
Ed Symkus of USA Today claims the film "stands tall as a groundbreaking piece of jaw-dropping, eye-widening entertainment". The Washington City Paper called it "a movie upon whose foundation we’ve built a sizable section of contemporary pop culture". Film historian Michael Price calls the film "the product of a remarkable group of daredevils, artists, and craftsmen." Brian Eggert claims that "King Kong's greatness remains in part because it demonstrates a compendium of Classic Hollywood production strategies." He additionally praises the music as "guid[ing] every emotion". Almar Haflidason of BBC praises the "fantastic atmosphere" of the score and the "richness of Kong's character." Haflidason adds that the animation is “technically brilliant [and] highly imaginative in terms of cinematic action”. Roger Ebert included King Kong in his "Great Movies" list, writing that "in the very artificiality of some of the special effects, there is a creepiness that isn't there in today's slick, flawless, computer-aided images... Even allowing for its slow start, wooden acting, and wall-to-wall screaming, there is something ageless and primeval about King Kong that still somehow works."

James Berardinelli writes that "advances in technology and acting have dated aspects of the production". He also adds that the acting is weak and that he feels "some sense of awe" in consideration of the special effects. The Guardian pointed out Kong's perceptible size changes, and remarked that compared to today's filmmaking techniques, King Kong "has ceased to be the thriller...and has become of the best comedies seen for years". In its review Time wrote that Kong "sometimes doubled in size". TIFF wrote that it is "reductive in its portrayal of humans, especially the Indigenous people".

On Rotten Tomatoes, the film holds an approval rating of 97% based on 116 reviews, with an average rating of 9/10. The site's critical consensus reads, "King Kong explores the soul of a monster – making audiences scream and cry throughout the film – in large part due to Kong's breakthrough special effects." On Metacritic the film currently has a rare weighted average score of 92 out of 100, based on 12 critics, indicating "universal acclaim".

== Analysis ==
=== Racial stereotypes ===
King Kong has undergone extensive analysis of its portrayal of race. NPR producer Robert Malesky remarks that, "To many, the eroticism and racism of the original film are just side themes and part of the fabric of 1930s America." Author Ryan Britt feels that critics were willing to overlook the film's problematic aspects as "just unattractive byproducts of the era in which the film was made". He adds, "the meta-fictional aspects almost excuse some of the cultural insensitivity". In the 19th and early 20th century, people of African descent were commonly represented visually as ape-like, a metaphor that fit racist stereotypes further bolstered by the emergence of scientific racism. Early films frequently mirrored racial tensions. While King Kong is often compared to the story of Beauty and the Beast, many film scholars have argued that the film was a cautionary tale about interracial romance, in which the film's "carrier of blackness is not a human being, but an ape." Jordan Zakarin of Inverse quotes author John Michlig, who explains that even though many modern viewers see the film as racist, it exhibits 1930s perceptions of obscure locations and peoples.

The film has been criticized for racial stereotyping of the native people and Charlie the cook, the latter of whom exclaims, "Crazy black man been here!" when he discovers Ann has been kidnapped. Filmmaker Fatimah Rony argues that Charlie is feminized in his occupation and gesticulations. She also views the native people's "savagery" as being associated with their dark skin. In 2013 Atlanta Black Star described the people native to the island "as subhuman, or primate...[without] a distinct way of communicating". Rony points out that African Americans and a Yaqui man were cast to portray Indonesian people. In her view, racial undertones are present when Ann is preferred for the sacrifice rather than the girl who is native to Skull Island. Wayne State University film professor Cynthia Erb remarks that "Ann's prized whiteness" is "the most disturbing racial" component, rather than "Kong's blackness". Erb explains that in jungle films "the depiction of natives was often patronizing, stereotypical, racist." She adds, "I think it does happen with the Skull Islanders."

Critics have also seen Kong himself as a perpetuation of racial tensions. Atlanta Black Star perceived a racial allegory between Kong and black men, remarking that Kong "meets his demise due to his insatiable desire for a white woman". Erb argues that the portrayal of Kong is one of a "noble savage" and a fighter rather than a "sexual aggressor". In her analysis Rony relates Kong to the "noble savage" because he fights off the dinosaurs due to his affection for Ann. She remarks that Kong is "not exclusively black", as he is connected to Asia due to his Eastern-inspired name as well as the Indonesian location of Skull Island. She calls it "one of the most outrageous 'racial films' ever made", opining that it is one among several films of the time that portrays a person with African, Asian, or Pacific Islander ancestry "as an ape-monster". According to Rony, Cooper decided to make Ann blonde to emphasize the difference between her and Kong, and as a white woman she was established as "a kind of lure for the monster-like beast". Her fair complexion contrasts with his dark complexion, which film analyst Rhona Berenstein argues is implicitly associated with his "monstrosity".

Concerns surrounding biracial interactions in the film have also arisen. Rony claims the film "ultimately celebrates cinema's tendency to create monsters which mirror the anxieties of any given age". According to Rony, Kong symbolizes biracial sexual relationships, which were looked down upon at the time of the film's release. Berenstein sees Kong and Ann's relationship as "a vehicle for racial crossing", arguing that the film both "confirms" and "destablizes" the idea of "white supremacy". She explains that Ann serves as a warning against and as a summons for "the monstrous possibility of miscegenation". Writer James A. Snead and German Studies professor Dagmar Lorenz compare Denham to a colonialist and link Kong's capture to the slave trade. Erb takes the idea of Denham as colonialist to argue that, following the prologue, the film appears to "challenge" colonialism. Zakarin claims that elements that may be seen as disturbing stemmed from what Cooper believed would make the film adventurous.

=== Ann's relationships ===
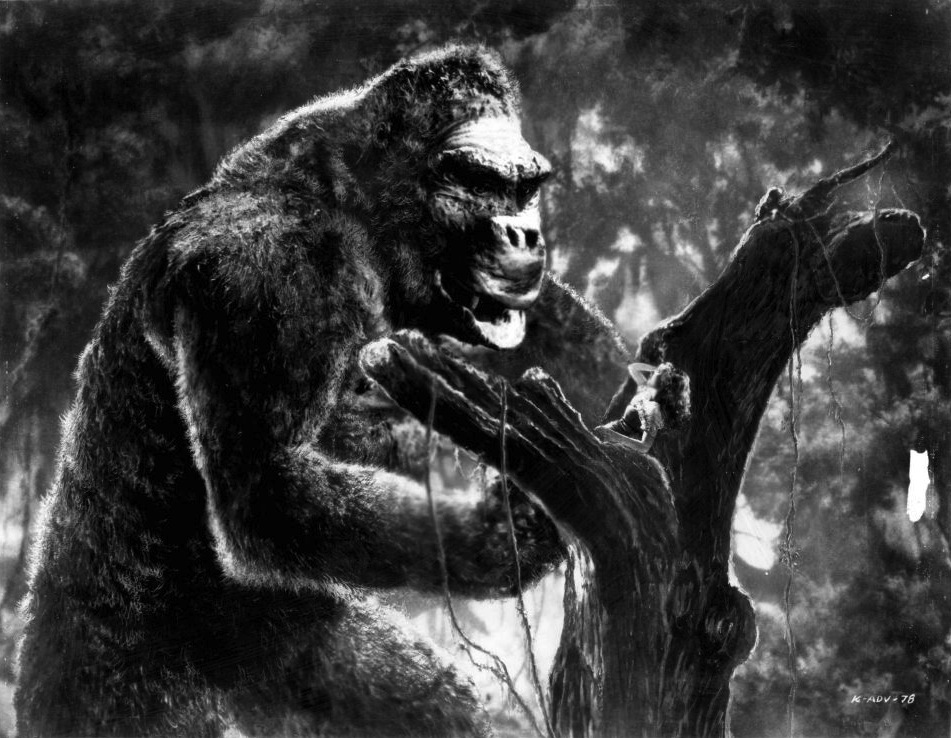
Kong puts Ann (Fay Wray) in a tree for safety (and to prevent her escape) before he battles a Tyrannosaurus

The film has been called sexist in its portrayal of women. J. P. Telotte claims that the film "sets up a pattern of repression" in the largely male ship crew as well as with Denham's and Jack's "antiromantic remarks". According to author Joseph Andriano, the film attempts to reduce the idea of sexism by creating a relationship between King Kong and Ann. He adds that this attempt does not work because Ann is portrayed as helpless. Because Kong's eventual downfall results from "feminine charm", Andriano suggests that the film implies a "helpless female" is more powerful than an able male. According to Rhona Berenstein, screaming women are "central to [the] jungle-horror" genre. Denham coaches Ann's screaming when there is nothing to scream at. Berenstein remarks that this coached screaming may bleed into her reaction to Kong, rendering it a performance. She furthers the argument by stating that the practiced screaming indicates that Ann's and Kong's relationship "is not simply that between a victim and a monster", adding that Ann's victimization via Kong comes only after she seeks independence.

Berenstein parallels Ann's sacrifice to Kong with Denham's Kong exhibit in New York City, suggesting that this makes Ann and Kong "both doubles and adversaries". She views the film as creating a relatability between "people of color, a white woman, and a simian monster". Mark Rubinstein parallels Kong's New York rampage to his efforts to protect Ann on Skull Island, remarking that Kong both protects Ann and acts as if she belongs to him. Rubinstein argues that the proverb appearing at the film's beginning warns about love, specifically that if a man is romantically attracted to a woman he will experience a "downfall". He argues that Ann does not return Kong's affection. Wray herself claimed that Ann had no romantic feelings for Kong but instead feared him.

It has also been suggested that Ann is under Denham's control. Erb remarks that while Kong seeks a romantic relationship with Ann, Denham seeks to earn money because of her. She explains that Denham appears "control-oriented" to modern viewers, whereas to 1930s viewers he would have appeared "more as the enterprising showman". According to Rony and Berenstein, Ann is controlled by Denham, who uses her "as an object of trade and of spectacle", subjecting her to the male gaze while practicing her screams under Denham's direction. Snead remarks that in the film women become "a sort of visual capital" rather than "people or potential partners".

=== Nature and civilization ===
While Cooper and Schoedsack insisted in contemporary interviews that there was no hidden meaning to King Kong, an article released after the former's death, as he would thus be unable to dispute it, claimed Cooper's inspiration for the film was rooted in the image of a giant ape falling from the tallest building, which would represent how primitive people are doomed by modern civilization. This idea has been taken up in scholarly analysis of the film. In her analysis Erb focuses on the struggle between primitivism and civilization. In her view, Kong invokes a sense of primitivism and symbolizes nature, while Denham symbolizes modern society. The film, she argues, demonstrates "nature's revenge on culture" and nature's eventual defeat. While Erb explains that she does not disagree with views of the film involving sexism and racism, she argues that Kong's interactions with Ann reach beyond race and sex. She argues that when Kong partially undresses Ann, it "initiate[s] her into the realm of the wild". Touching her and smelling her clothes are primitivist actions, Erb suggests, because it focuses on senses other than sight. Heavy reliance on sight is associated with modern society. Erb explains that Kong's alternation of aggressiveness and gentleness "arguably embodies both the demonic and Edenic impulses of the jungle tradition" common in 1930s film. According to Erb, through contrast Skull Island is set up as a counterpart to New York City.

Telotte takes a similar approach, pointing out that many of the island scenes reflect the events of the city scenes. According to Telotte, Kong is taken from an "Edenic world" to be exploited in the modern world. Kong's New York City rampage is an "effort to tear down the base of modern culture itself". Dagmar Lorenz argues that the film establishes "Western civilization as the source of Kong's destruction" and explains that portraying Skull Island's "wildness" seems to convey an idea of "barbarity". Tom Shales of The Washington Post takes a different approach, suggesting that the film is "an allegory about modern man, sort of, facing his own nature", rather than about beauty killing the beast.

=== Social impact during the Great Depression ===
The weekend after Kong's release, newly-elected President Franklin Roosevelt ordered a bank holiday to halt the panic in the financial sector. Innovation historian Jason Voiovich calls the film "The First Popcorn Movie," making the case that King Kong helped nervous people process the extreme economic stress. The movie served its purpose as an escape on one level, but on another, the monster represented the fear of the Great Depression and that people could conquer it in the end.

== Legacy and franchise ==
=== Legacy ===
Since its release the film has received some significant honors. In 1975, Kong was named one of the 50 best American films by the American Film Institute. Around this time it also gained academic attention. In 1981 a video game titled Donkey Kong, starring a character with similarities to Kong, was released. In 1991, the film was deemed "culturally, historically and aesthetically significant" by the Library of Congress and selected for preservation in the United States National Film Registry. In 1998, the AFI ranked the film #43 on its list of the 100 greatest movies of all time.

The film's stop motion effects by Willis H. O'Brien left a lasting impact on the film industry worldwide and inspired other genre films such as Mighty Joe Young, The Beast from 20,000 Fathoms, Creature from the Black Lagoon, Mothra, and Jurassic Park. The film was also one of the biggest inspirations for Godzilla, with Tomoyuki Tanaka stating, "I felt like doing something big. That was my motivation. I thought of different ideas. I like monster movies, and I was influenced by King Kong."

Daiei Film, the company which later produced Gamera, Daimajin and other tokusatsu films, distributed the 1952 re-release of King Kong in Japan, making it the first post-war release of monster movies in the country. The company also distributed The Beast from 20,000 Fathoms in Japan in 1954, and these distributions presumably influenced productions of both Godzilla and Gamera franchises.

Author Daniel Loxton suggested that King Kong inspired the modern day legend of the Loch Ness Monster.

In 2025, The Hollywood Reporter listed King Kong as having the best stunts of 1932 to 1933.

==== American Film Institute Lists ====
- AFI's 100 Years...100 Movies – #43
- AFI's 100 Years...100 Thrills – #12
- AFI's 100 Years...100 Passions – #24
- AFI's 100 Years...100 Heroes and Villains:
  - Kong – Nominated Villain
- AFI's 100 Years...100 Movie Quotes:
  - "Oh, no, it wasn't the airplanes. It was Beauty killed the Beast." – #84
- AFI's 100 Years of Film Scores – #13
- AFI's 100 Years...100 Movies (10th Anniversary Edition) – #41
- AFI's 10 Top 10 – #4 Fantasy Film

=== Sequel and franchise ===
Delos W. Lovelace was hired by Cooper to compose a novel version of King Kong. Lovelace appeared as the author alongside the credit "conceived by Edgar Wallace and Merian C. Cooper". Walter Ripperger wrote a two-part serial version for Mystery, which was credited as "the last creation of Edgar Wallace".

The film and characters inspired imitations and installments. The same year of King Kong's release, Son of Kong, a sequel, was fast-tracked and released. In the 1960s, RKO licensed the King Kong character to Japanese studio Toho, which made two films, King Kong vs. Godzilla, the third film in Toho's long-running Godzilla series, and King Kong Escapes. Both were directed by Ishirō Honda. These films are mostly unrelated to the original and follow a very different style. In 1976 producer Dino De Laurentiis released a modern remake of King Kong. It follows the same basic plot, but the setting is moved to the present day and several other details are different. This remake was followed by a 1986 sequel King Kong Lives. In 1998, a loosely-adapted direct-to-video animated version, The Mighty Kong, was distributed by Warner Bros. In 2005, Universal Pictures released another remake of King Kong, co-written and directed by Peter Jackson, which is set in the 1930s, as in the original film. Legendary Pictures and Warner Bros. made Kong: Skull Island (2017), which serves as part of a cinematic universe, Monsterverse, followed by the sequels Godzilla vs. Kong (2021) and Godzilla x Kong: The New Empire (2024).

The search for censored scenes inspired a play called "Censored Scenes from King Kong," performed in 1980. A reviewer in The Hollywood Reporter called it the "worst offering" in a bad season.

== See also ==
- List of films featuring dinosaurs
- List of films featuring giant monsters
- List of highest-grossing films
- List of stop motion films
- 1933 in film

== Bibliography ==
- American Film Institute (June 17, 2008). "AFI Crowns Top 10 Films in 10 Classic Genres". Archived from the original on June 19, 2008.
- Andriano, Joseph D. (1999). Immortal Monster: The Mythological Evolution of the Fantastic Beast in Modern Fiction and Film. Contributions to the Study of Science Fiction and Fantasy, Number 78. Westport, Connecticut: Greenwood Press. ISBN 0-313-30667-2.
- Annette, Kuhn. (2007). "King Kong." In: Cook, Pam. (ed.) The Cinema Book. London: British Film Institute. P,41. and Robinson, D. (1983). "King Kong." In: Lloyd, A. (ed.) Movies of the Thirties. Orbis Publishing Ltd.
- Archer, Steve (1993). Willis O'Brien: Special Effects Genius. Jefferson, North Carolina: McFarland Classics. ISBN 0-7864-0573-2.
- Berenstein, Rhoda J. (1996). Attack of the Leading Ladies: Gender, Sexuality, and Spectatorship in Classic Horror Cinema. Columbia University Press. ISBN 0-231-08463-3.
- Cotta Vaz, Mark (2005). Living Dangerously: The Adventures of Merian C. Cooper, Creator of King Kong. New York: Villard Books. ISBN 1-4000-6276-4.
- Doherty, Thomas Patrick (1999). Pre-Code Hollywood: Sex, Immorality, and Insurrection in American Cinema, 1930–1934. Columbia University Press. p. 293. ISBN 0231110944.
- Dyson, Jeremy (1997). Bright Darkness: The Lost Art of the Supernatural Horror Film. London: Cassell.
- Eagan, Daniel (2010). America's Film Legacy: The Authoritative Guide to the Landmark Movies in the National Film Registry. The Continuum International Publishing Group Inc, New York, NY p. 22. ISBN 9780826429773.
- Ebert, Roger (February 3, 2002). "King Kong Movie Review & Film Summary (1933)". RogerEbert.com. Ebert Digital LLC.
- Erb, Cynthia Marie (2009). Tracking King Kong: A Hollywood Icon in World Culture. Wayne State University Press. p. xvii. ISBN 978-0-8143-3430-0. Archived from the original on August 4, 2020.
- Erish, Andrew (January 8, 2006). "Illegitimate Dad of King Kong". Los Angeles Times. Archived from the original on March 14, 2013.
- Grant, Elizabeth. (1996). "Here Comes the Bride." In Grant, Barry Keith (ed.), The Dread of Difference: Gender and the Horror Film. Austin: University of Texas Press.
- Goldner, Orville and George E. Turner (1975). The Making of King Kong: The Story Behind a Film Classic. A.S. Barnes. ISBN 0498015106.
- Gottesman, Ronald and Harry Geduld, ed. (1976). The Girl in the Hairy Paw: King Kong as Myth, Movie, and Monster. Avon. ISBN 0380006103.
- Von Gunden, Kenneth (1989). Flights of Fancy: The Great Fantasy Films. McFarland. ISBN 0-89950-397-7.
- Hall, Mordaunt (March 3, 1933). "King Kong". The New York Times.
- Hall, Roger L. (1997). A Guide to Film Music: Songs and Scores. PineTree Press.
- Harryhausen, Ray (1985). "Animating the Ape". In Lloyd, Ann; Robinson, David (eds.). Movies of the Thirties. UK: Orbis Publishing Ltd. ISBN 978-0856135231.
- Harryhausen, Ray; Dalton, Tony (2008). A Century of Model Animation: From Méliès to Aardman. London, England: Aurum Press. ISBN 978-1-84513-367-2.
- Haver, Ronald (1987). David O. Selznick's Hollywood. New York: Random House. ISBN 9780517476659.
- Jewell, Richard (1994). "RKO Film Grosses: 1931–1951". Historical Journal of Film, Radio and Television. 14 (1). "1933 release: $1,856,000; 1938 release: $306,000; 1944 release: $685,000"
- "King Kong Collection". Amazon UK. December 19, 2005.
- Lasky, Betty (1984). RKO: The Biggest Little Major of Them All. Prentice-Hall. ISBN 0-13-781451-8.
- Maltin, Leonard, ed. (2007). Leonard Maltin's 2008 Movie Guide. New York: Signet. ISBN 9780451221865.
- Lloyd, Ann; Robinson, David, eds. (1985). Movies of the Thirties. UK: Orbis Publishing Ltd.
- Lorenz, Dagmar C. G. (2007). "Transatlantic Perspectives on Men, Women, and Other Primates: The Ape Motif in Kafka, Canetti, and Cooper's and Jackson's King Kong Films". Women in German Yearbook. 23: 156–178. doi:10.1353/wgy.2008.0001. JSTOR 20688283.
- Morton, Ray (2005). King Kong: The History of a Movie Icon From Fay Wray to Peter Jackson. New York City: Applause Theatre & Cinema Books. ISBN 9781557836694. OCLC 61261236.
- Ollier, Claude. (May–June 1965). "Un roi à New York (A King in New York)" (Milne, Tom, trans.), in Hillier, Jim (ed.), Cahiers du Cinéma: The 1960s: New Wave, New Cinema, Reevaluating Hollywood, Harvard University Press, 1986.
- Peary, Gerald (2004). "Missing Links: The Jungle Origins of King Kong".;
- Rony, Fatimah Tobing (1996). The Third Eye: Race, Cinema, and Ethnographic Spectacle. Duke University Press. ISBN 0-8223-1840-7.
- "King Kong (1933)". Rotten Tomatoes. Fandango Media. Archived from the original on December 30, 2009.
- Rovin, Jeff (1977). From the Land Beyond Beyond: The Films of Willis O'Brien and Ray Harryhausen. New York, New York: Berkley Publishing Corporation. ISBN 978-0425035061.
- Rubinstein, Mark (Spring 1977). "King Kong: A Myth for Moderns". American Imago. 34 (1): 1–11. JSTOR 26303203.
- Slowik, Michael (2014). After the Silents: Hollywood Film Music in the Early Sound Era, 1926–1934. New York, New York: Columbia University Press. ISBN 978-0-231-16583-9.
- Smith, Steven C. (2020). Music by Max Steiner: The Epic Life of Hollywood's Most Influential Composer. New York City: Oxford University Press. ISBN 9780190623272.
- Telotte, J. P. (Summer 1988). "The Movies as Monster: Seeing in 'King Kong'". The Georgia Review. 42 (2): 388–398. JSTOR 41399404.
- United Press International. "Empire State Building to Dim Lights in Remembrance of Actress Fay Wray". United Press International, Inc.
- Wierzbicki, James (2009). Film Music: A History. New York, New York: Routledge. ISBN 978-0-415-99199-5.
