= Warner Archive Collection =

Home video line from Warner Home Video

- Logo used since 2024
- Type: Division
- Industry: Home video
- Founded: March 23, 2009; 17 years ago
- Products: Home video releases
- Services: Digital distribution Physical distribution
- Parent: Warner Bros. Home Entertainment

The Warner Archive Collection is a home video division for releasing classic and cult films from Warner Bros.' library. It started as a manufactured-on-demand (MOD) DVD series of 150 titles by Warner Bros. Home Entertainment on March 23, 2009, with the intention of putting previously unreleased catalog films on DVD for the first time. In November 2012, Warner expanded the Archive Collection to include Blu-ray releases. Some Warner Archive releases, such as Wise Guys (1986), previously had a pressed DVD release that lapsed out of print and have since been re-released as part of the Warner Archive collection.

DVDs are MOD for the consumer and authorized distributors for online resale using DVD-R Recordable media rather than the traditional business model of pressing large batches of discs that ship to "brick and mortar" retailers. This saves on the costs of storing unsold stock in a warehouse and mitigates the risk of retailers holding unsold merchandise, especially since the majority of the films in the archive do not have widespread public demand. However, the use of DVD-R Recordable media for manufacturing DVDs on-demand created an opportunity for the sale of counterfeit DVDs, as their quality was much easier to replicate than that of traditional mass-produced discs. Warner Archive claims the discs are indistinguishable in quality from to their mass-produced counterparts.

In addition, Warner Archive also sells films and television shows as downloadable Windows Media files, and formerly operated a subscription-based streaming video service, Warner Archive Instant, which allowed members to stream many of the Warner Archive properties in a format similar to Netflix. In 2018, Warner Archive Instant merged with its sister service, FilmStruck. The combined FilmStruck/Warner Archive streaming service was discontinued on November 29, 2018, and was replaced by HBO Max.

== Collection and operations ==
The collection consists of theatrical films, television shows, and television films from the libraries of Warner Bros. Pictures, Turner Entertainment Co. (including pre-May 1986 Metro-Goldwyn-Mayer (MGM), Associated Artists Productions, RKO Radio Pictures, Brut Productions), Hanna-Barbera Productions, pre-1991 Ruby-Spears Enterprises, HBO, The Saul Zaentz Company, Lorimar Productions, Warner Bros. Television, post-1970 The Wolper Organization, post-August 1946 Allied Artists Pictures, post-1946 Monogram Pictures, Samuel Goldwyn Productions, post-November 1984 New Line Cinema and post-1994 Castle Rock Entertainment.

Sony Pictures (including Columbia Pictures titles), Paramount Pictures, Metro-Goldwyn-Mayer, Universal Pictures, Walt Disney Studios, and 20th Century Fox also started MOD services after the success of Warner Archive. Their services are named Sony Pictures Choice Collection (formerly Screen Classics By Request), MGM Limited Edition Collection, Universal Vault Series, Disney Generations Collection, and Fox Cinema Archives, respectively. Including Warner, major film studios and including Lionsgate, CBS, MTV, and Nickelodeon also started to offer MOD discs of catalog titles through Amazon CreateSpace. On April 13, 2011, Warner Bros. Home Entertainment Group and Sony Pictures Home Entertainment announced that Warner Archive would offer on-demand titles from Sony. MGM Limited Edition titles are also sold through Warner Archive. From 2013 to 2017, as part of Paramount's agreement with Warner Bros., select Paramount titles were released under the Warner Archive moniker.

=== Blu-ray ===
The Archive Collection began releasing titles on Blu-ray in November 2012, with the first two releases being Deathtrap (1982) and Gypsy (1962). Unlike their DVDs, all Warner Archive Blu-rays use pressed discs.

Over the years, Warner Archive's Blu-ray releases expanded to include season sets of current television series, such as iZombie, The 100, Longmire, The Originals, Lucifer, Lethal Weapon, Ballers, Final Space and Looney Tunes Cartoons.

The Warner Archive Collection began releasing titles on Ultra HD Blu-ray in November 2024, starting with The Searchers.

=== Streaming ===
Expanding their films' availability to Internet streaming, in July 2014, Warner Archive introduced the Warner Archive Instant service. Similar to Netflix, Warner Archive Instant allowed its members access to various Warner Archive library titles via their website, in addition to apps for Roku and iOS-based devices.

In February 2018, Warner Archive retired its online streaming service, transferring several of its films to FilmStruck. However, FilmStruck was shut down on November 29, 2018, and so Warner Archive replaced it with HBO Max in 2020.

== Licensors ==
- The Criterion Collection
- Arrow Video
- Alliance Entertainment (formerly Mill Creek Entertainment) (select television series and movies only)
- Shout! Studios (television series and movies library)
