= Robert Stein (computer pioneer) =

American businessman

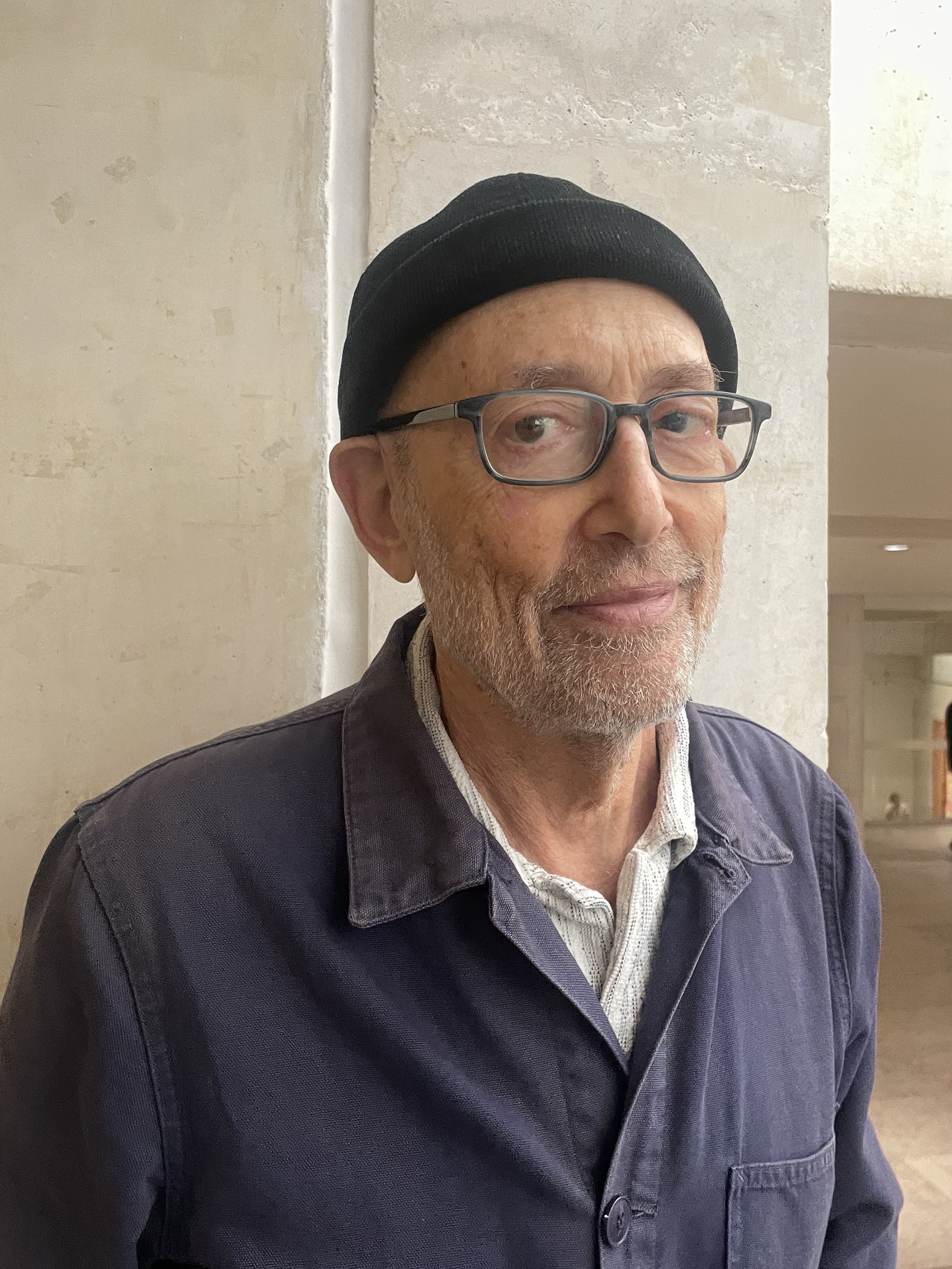
Bob Stein (Lisbon, Nov. 2025)

Robert (Bob) Stein (born April 20, 1946) is an American businessman. He is a co-founder of The Voyager Company in 1985, the first commercial multimedia CD-ROM publisher, and The Criterion Collection in 1984, a collection of definitive films on digital media with in-depth background information (including the first films with recorded audio commentary).

Born and raised in New York City, Stein attended Columbia University, majoring in psychology. Later, he earned a master's degree in education from Harvard University.

Stein then worked with Alan Kay at the Atari Research Group on various electronic publishing projects.

After Voyager, Stein founded Night Kitchen to develop authoring tools for experimental electronic publishing, primarily TK3.

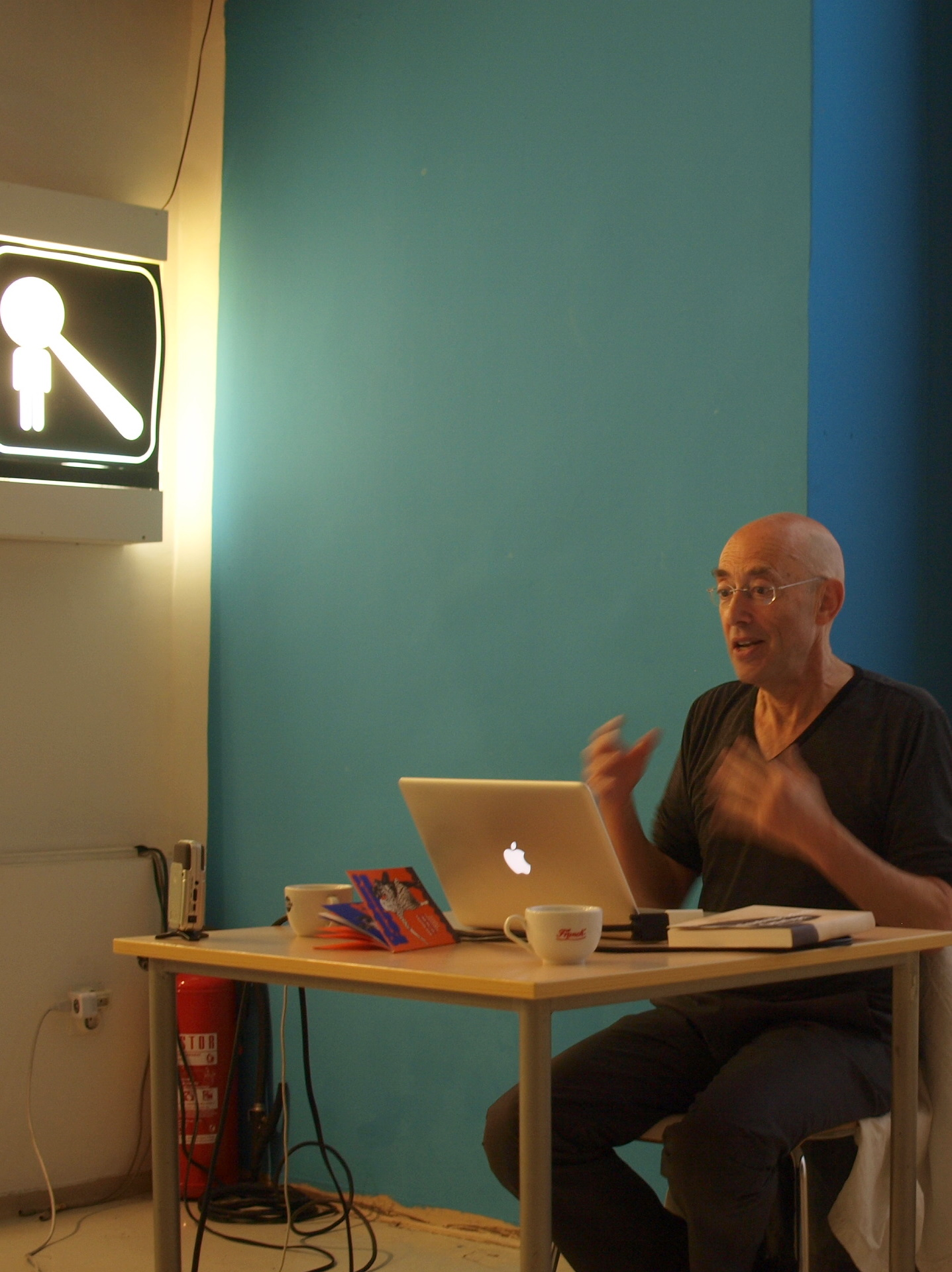
Bob Stein lecturing at Multimedia Institut's club MaMa in Zagreb, 2009 (audio)

Stein is the director of the Institute for the Future of the Book. According to Stein: "The Institute has two principal activities. One is building high-end tools for making complex electronic documents (part of the Mellon Foundation's higher-ed digital infrastructure initiative). The other is exploring and hopefully influencing the evolution of new forms of intellectual expression and discourse." This new scholarly direction is being explored under the umbrella of MediaCommons.

In 2019 Stein donated his archival papers and hard drives to Stanford University.
