= Criterion Closet =

Video series by The Criterion Collection

The Criterion Closet is a film closet owned and stocked by the Criterion Collection, a home video distribution company based in New York City with a specific emphasis on licensing, restoring, and distributing "important classic and contemporary films".

Located in their office, the film closet contains every title distributed by Criterion, totaling over 1,700 films by about 600 directors from more than 50 countries. Criterion invites prominent people in the film industry to visit the closet and talk about films that have been meaningful to them while filming them for the company's YouTube channel. According to The New York Times, it was formerly a "disused bathroom" before being repurposed.

== History ==
In 2010, director Guillermo del Toro visited the Criterion office, during which he was filmed with an iPhone making his selections from the Criterion Closet. There, he made picks including Stanley Donen's Charade, Ingmar Bergman's The Magician, Terry Zwigoff's Crumb, and others.

Since then, Criterion has filmed over two hundred individuals making their own selections from the Criterion Closet in a video series called Closet Picks. Past visitors have included Bill Hader, Martin Scorsese, Park Chan-wook, Cate Blanchett, Bong Joon-ho, Ayo Edebiri, Charli XCX and Todd Field, who told The New York Times, "There's no cynicism in the closet. It's all love. It's all about why people do what they do and how powerful movies are for us."

In 2024, for the company's 40th anniversary, Criterion built a replica of the Criterion Closet inside of an 18-foot van. The van's debut at the New York Film Festival during weekends in September and October were highly attended, with some visitors waiting as long as 10 hours in line to get inside of the van and purchase Criterion titles. The van also appeared at the Toronto International Film Festival in September 2025 and the 61st Chicago International Film Festival in October 2025.

== Mobile closet ==
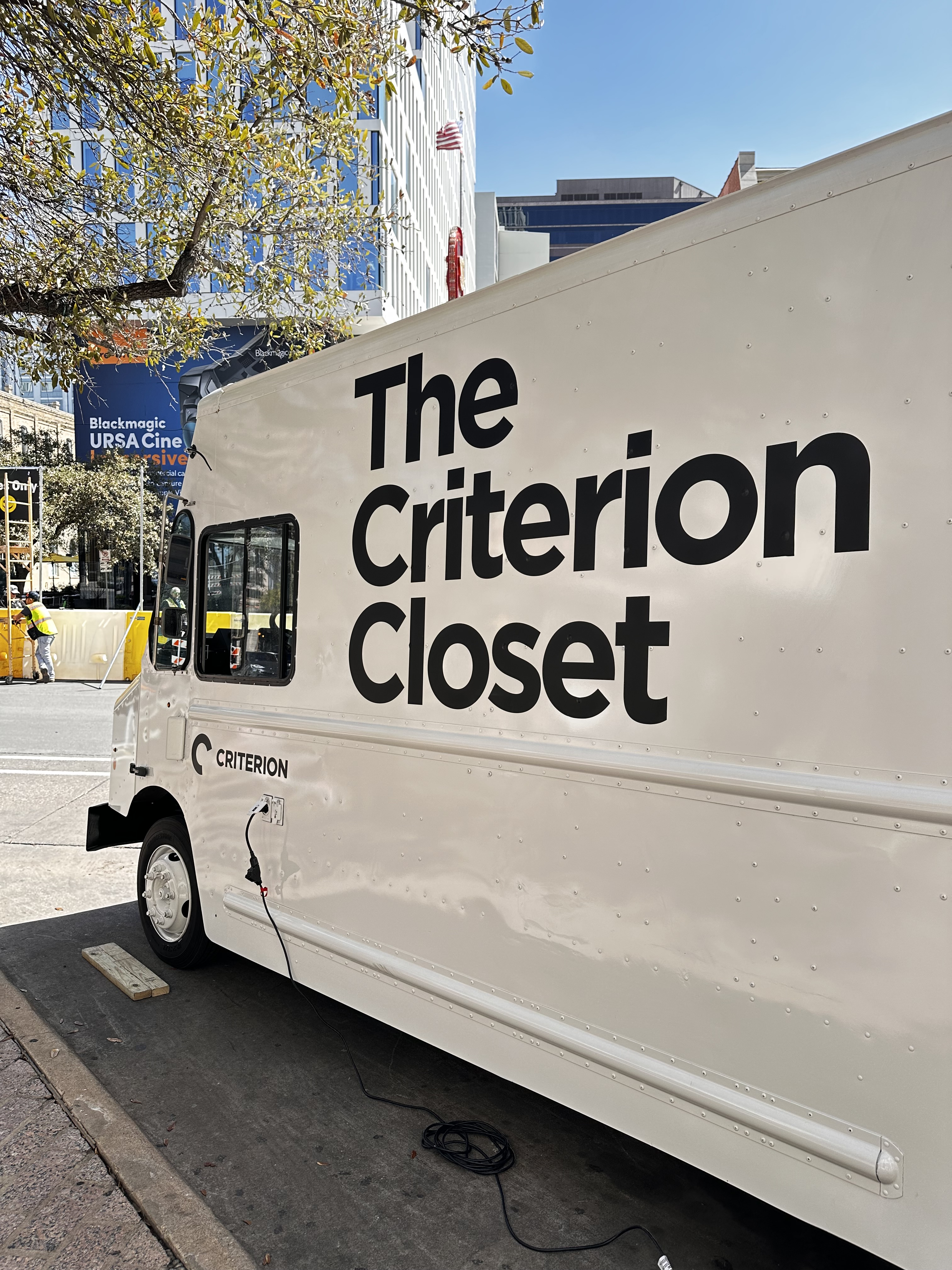
Criterion Mobile Closet at SXSW 2025

In 2024, the year of the company's 40th anniversary, Criterion announced they had built a replica of their film closet in an 18-foot van that would then be taken on a road trip all throughout the United States. Regarding the van's construction, Criterion President Peter Becker stated: "We had a big learning curve. From choosing a truck to designing the experience, [we made sure that it] wouldn't just be fun for the few minutes you're inside the truck but fun for the people outside, too." In addition to its replica closet, the van also has a screen constantly streaming Closet Picks videos.

During the van's road trip, guests could step inside, take merchandise like a tote bag and "printed pocket guide," and make Closet Picks of their own. Reservations were not needed, and each guest was allowed a maximum of three minutes inside. The van's selection included "every in-print edition from the Criterion Collection, including box sets, as well as all in-print releases from our Eclipse and Janus Contemporaries lines," and all titles were on sale for a 40% discount. Guests could buy a maximum of three. Upon the conclusion of their visit, guests had a photograph taken of them with their Closet Pick.

The road trip began at Lincoln Center in Manhattan during the 62nd installment of the New York Film Festival from September 28–29 and October 5–6. The van's New York City stop was densely packed according to Esquire: "Even though the weather was unforgiving, a staggeringly long line wrapped around the block, where fans had been waiting since 7:00 a.m. for a three-minute-long window to shop the movie lover's paradise." Annie Aguiar, writing for The New York Times, also reported waiting three hours and spoke with visitors who waited upwards of 10 hours in line, amid rainy weather, to make a Closet Pick; according to Aguiar, approximately 900 visitors came to the van during its two weekends in New York City. Some visitors camped out with folding chairs, as well as books and games, to mitigate their waiting times; The Cut, in their coverage of the New York Film Festival, captured a photo series of those in line. Afterward, the van embarked on a nationwide tour.

In April 2026, it was announced that the Mobile Closet would be coming to Portland's South Park Blocks. The van parked across from the main entrance of the Portland Art Museum (PAM), from May 29–31, as part of the PAM's Center for an Untold Tomorrow (CUT) Cinema Unbound Week.

== Criterion Collection 40 ==
Also in celebration of Criterion's 40th anniversary, the Criterion Collection 40 box set (abbreviated to CC40) was announced in the summer of 2024 which consists of 40 "of the films most frequently selected from the closet" and includes "all of the special features from their stand-alone editions" as well as a series of essays. It was released on November 19 for $799.95.

Titles

- 8½
- Tokyo Story
- All That Jazz
- Bicycle Thieves
- Repo Man
- Naked
- Jules and Jim
- Being There
- Weekend
- Yi Yi
- The Night of the Hunter
- Pickpocket
- Sweet Smell of Success
- On the Waterfront
- Do the Right Thing
- Ratcatcher
- Sunday Bloody Sunday
- Mirror
- Barry Lyndon
- Safe
- Seconds
- His Girl Friday
- Mishima: A Life in Four Chapters
- Y tu mamá también
- My Own Private Idaho
- Love & Basketball
- Night of the Living Dead
- Ace in the Hole
- 3 Women
- The Red Shoes
- Down by Law
- La ciénaga
- Wanda
- House
- Sullivan's Travels
- The Battle of Algiers
- A Woman Under the Influence
- Cléo from 5 to 7
- Persona
- In the Mood for Love

== See also ==
- Cinephilia
- Disney Vault
