= Beethoven's Ninth Symphony CD-ROM =

One of the earliest CD-ROMs

Beethoven's Ninth Symphony CD-ROM was one of the first titles to couple a CD-ROM with an Audio CD. This title, a companion to Beethoven's Symphony No. 9, was developed in 1989 by the Voyager Company in Apple Computer's HyperCard, using custom audio XCMDs developed at Voyager. The lead instructor and creative voice was UCLA music instructor Robert Winter.

Beethoven's Ninth Symphony CD-ROM, while offering black and white images on a 512×342 resolution display, offered full 44 kHz stereo audio by controlling an off-the-shelf audio CD in the CD-ROM player.

Historically, Beethoven's Ninth Symphony CD-ROM is of importance as it was an early example of interactive media that reached the consumer market, before the popularization of the Internet or DVDs. On witnessing the CD-ROM, Bill Gates reportedly said: "We've finally seen what CD-ROM was made for".
