= Expanded Books =

The Expanded Books Project was a project by The Voyager Company during 1991, that investigated how a book could be presented on a computer screen in a way that would be both familiar and useful to regular book readers. The project focused on perfecting font choice, font size, line spacing, margin notes, book marks, and other publishing details to work in digital format.

Much of the impetus for Expanded Books derived from a meeting on digital books that Voyager sponsored on Bloomsday in 1990, attended by various pioneering multimedia and hypertext experts. Voyager had earlier released a successful CD companion to Beethoven's Symphony No. 9, and its president Bob Stein had obtained a grant to work on creating a similar product for literature. At this meeting, a consensus emerged that, to overcome the relative inconvenience of being tied to a low-resolution and cumbersome digital display, digital books would have to offer "added value". Florian Brody, head of the Expanded Books project, had the idea to design digital books specifically for the then-new Apple PowerBook 100, which Apple had donated to Voyager.

The programming for the initial products took place between October and December 1991. The first three book titles (The Complete Hitch Hiker's Guide to the Galaxy, The Complete Annotated Alice, and Jurassic Park) were released at MacWorld San Francisco in January 1992. These books and their successors relied on a "book engine" that provided a simple but powerful feature set: convenient and simple search methods, the ability to switch between large print and normal print versions, unobtrusive navigation tools (such as a chapter menu that dropped down from the chapter heading on each "page"), a margin area on each page in which readers could write notes, and interactive annotations. For example, Moby-Dick included a sound clip of the sea as an annotation, and The Annotated Alice provided pop-up annotations derived from both editions of Martin Gardner's work. However, some readers found these annotations unwieldy and difficult to navigate, with poor usability.

Expanded Books was not initially the definitive title of the product range. Another favored contender was "Power Books", but that idea died when Voyager was told Apple's about-to-be-released notebooks were to be called PowerBooks. Hence, the original project name became the product name.

Between February 1992 and August 1992, Voyager created the Expanded Books Toolkit, which allowed authors to create their own Expanded Books. Voyager themselves went on to produce over 60 books as Expanded Books; the underlying software was also used in CD-ROMs such as A Hard Day's Night, Salt of the Earth, and Macbeth.

All programming for the Expanded Books and Toolkit was in HyperCard, with the exception of a few XCMDs and strings stored as resources.
