= Ronald Haver =

American historian (1939–1993)

Ronald Haver (January 14, 1939 – May 18, 1993) was an American film historian, preservationist and author. For over twenty years, he was director of Film Programs at the Los Angeles County Museum of Art.

In 1981, the idea to restore the classic Judy Garland version of the film A Star is Born (1954) took hold as the Academy of Motion Picture Arts and Sciences made tribute to longtime lyricist Ira Gershwin by screening "The Man That Got Away" number. Haver started his search for the lost footage in 1982 after being approved by the academy. He found the footage in the Sound Department storage facility at the Warner Bros. studios and restored the deleted scenes from the film. These scenes, including two musical numbers, were cut by the studio shortly after its premiere due to distributor complaints about the film's length. Warner Bros. made the deletions without the cooperation of its director, George Cukor, and the scenes were lost for years, much to the disappointment of Garland fans and film historians. Because of the missing footage for the film, Haver used Cukor's production stills to cover the missing footage. The "restored" version of the film was screened at Radio City Music Hall on July 7, 1983, and was released nationwide.

Haver was also involved with second audio commentary tracks for many Criterion Collection LaserDisc releases such as the original King Kong and The Wizard of Oz. Haver's 1984 LaserDisc commentary of King Kong is considered to be the first audio commentary ever recorded.

Haver died on May 18, 1993, from an AIDS-related illness in a Culver City nursing home at the age of 54.

== Bibliography ==
- David O. Selznick's Hollywood. New York: Knopf. 1980. ISBN 0-517-47665-7.
- David O. Selznick's Gone With the Wind. New York: Bonanza Books, distributed by Outlet Books, a Random House Co. 1986. ISBN 0-517-60677-1.
- A Star Is Born: The Making of the 1954 Movie and its 1983 Restoration. New York: Alfred A. Knopf. 1988. ISBN 0-394-53714-9. (Free preview at Amazon.com)
