= FilmStruck =

Film streaming service

- Type: Streaming service
- Industry: Film
- Founded: November 1, 2016; 9 years ago
- Defunct: November 29, 2018; 7 years ago
- Successor: HBO Max; The Criterion Channel
- Headquarters: Atlanta,
- Owner: WarnerMedia
- Parent: Turner Broadcasting System
- Website: www.filmstruck.com

FilmStruck was a film streaming service from Turner Classic Movies which catered to cinephiles and focused on rare, classic, foreign, arthouse, and independent cinema. It launched in November 2016 and succeeded Hulu as the exclusive online streaming home of The Criterion Collection. It was discontinued on November 29, 2018.

== History ==
FilmStruck was launched on November 1, 2016, after being announced in April 2016. At the time of its launch, FilmStruck had 500 movies available to stream, 200 of them from the Criterion Collection library. As of February 2018, the combined channels on the service provided access to over 1,600 films, including more than 1,200 films licensed from the Criterion Collection. On April 26, 2018, FilmStruck absorbed sister stand-alone service Warner Archive Instant, with current and new subscribers to the FilmStruck website.

On October 26, 2018, it was announced FilmStruck would shut down on November 29, 2018, due to WarnerMedia's restructuring. In response, a group of film directors and actors signed a letter dated November 12, 2018, appealing directly to Warner Bros. Pictures Group chairman Toby Emmerich in an attempt to save the service. The letter was signed by Paul Thomas Anderson, Damien Chazelle, Alfonso Cuarón, Guillermo del Toro, Leonardo DiCaprio, James Gray, Alejandro González Iñárritu, Barry Jenkins, Rian Johnson, Christopher Nolan, Barbra Streisand, and others. Previously, Steven Spielberg and Martin Scorsese had urged Warner Bros. to continue the service. Four days after the letter was released, WarnerMedia and Criterion announced that The Criterion Channel would launch as a standalone service in Spring 2019, with a smaller version of the service also being available via HBO Max, then WarnerMedia's upcoming streaming platform when it launched on May 27, 2020.

== Library and programming ==
Films available on FilmStruck came from studios and distributors such as Film Movement, First Run Features, Global Lens, Flicker Alley, Icarus Films, Janus Films, Kino, MGM, Milestone, Oscilloscope Laboratories, Shout! Factory, and Warner Bros.

FilmStruck organized films in themed collections, while the Criterion Channel had original content such as their "Meet the Filmmaker" and "Adventures in Moviegoing" series, five-minute micro-lectures, as well as thematic programming like Friday double features and Tuesday short and feature film pairings. Some films featured hosted introductions.

In early 2018, FilmStruck announced it had acquired hundreds of classic film titles from the Warner Bros. library, including Casablanca, Citizen Kane, and Singin' in the Rain.

== Reception ==
The Verge praised the availability of "best films ever made", while criticizing the catalog search functionality in July 2017. Geek.com praised the delivery on home theater streaming media devices and the mobile app, but criticized the desktop delivery dependency on Flash.

== International availability ==
FilmStruck Curzon was announced in January 2018. The service became available in the United Kingdom in February 2018, with launches in other markets to have come over the next two years. Plans to launch in France and Spain were announced in May 2018.

In France, the SVOD service features films from Carlotta Films, MK2, RKO, and StudioCanal and was launched in June 2018. In Spain, the service serves up films from Wanda, Caramel, and A Contracorriente Films. It offers a combination of the local content as well as European and global films.

== See also ==
- Fandor
- Mubi
- HBO Max
  - DramaFever
  - DC Universe
  - Hooq
- VRV
- Crunchyroll
- List of streaming media services
