= Voyager Company =

American pioneer in LaserDiscs and CD-ROMs (1984–1997)

The Voyager Company
- Industry: Software
- Founded: 1984; 42 years ago
- Founder: Robert Stein
- Defunct: 1997
- Fate: Liquidation
- Successor: The Criterion Collection
- Headquarters: United States
- Products: LaserDiscs, Interactive CD-ROM, The Criterion Collection

The Voyager Company was a pioneer in CD-ROM production in the 1980s and early 1990s. It was founded in 1984 by four partners: Jon Turell, Bill Becker, Aleen Stein, and Robert Stein in Santa Monica, California, and later moved to New York City. The firm took its name from the Voyager space craft. In partnership with Janus Films, the company published The Criterion Collection, a pioneering home video collection of classic and important contemporary films on LaserDisc. Voyager introduced the release of special editions on LaserDisc.

In 1986 it decided to make it company policy to only release widescreen films on LaserDisc in their original aspect ratio rather than pan and scan formats that was common for home media releases at the time. Many other labels followed suit.

In 1994, the partnership was diluted by selling 20% of it to the von Holzbrinck Publishing Group, a German holding company. In 1997, the Holzbrinck Group withdrew with its 20%, the name "Voyager", and half of the CD-ROM rights. Robert Stein took the other half of the CD-ROM rights and the Toolkit rights. This left the Criterion Collection in the possession of three of the original partners, each with a third: Aleen Stein, the Becker family, and the Turell family.

== Releases ==
=== LaserDiscs ===
- De Italia
- The Great Quake of '89 (in partnership with ABC News Interactive)
- The National Gallery of Art
- Devo: The Complete Truth About De-Evolution
- The Residents: Twenty Twisted Questions (Part 1/2)
- Louvre
- Theatre of the Imagination: Radio Stories by Orson Welles and The Mercury Theatre (1988, ISBN 0-931393-90-6)
- To New Horizons: Ephemeral Films 1931–1945
- The Vancouver Disc
- Vienna
- You Can't Get There From Here: Ephemeral Films 1945–1960
- The Voyager Videostack
- Boyz n the Hood
- Bram Stoker's Dracula
- Cries and Whispers
- Damage
- The Killer
- The Man Who Fell to Earth
- The Player
- The Inland Sea
- Call It Home: The House That Private Enterprise Built
- François Truffaut: 25 Years, 25 Films
- Polyester
- Ugetsu

=== CD-ROMs ===
- A Hard Day's Night
- A World Alive
- All My Hummingbirds Have Alibis By Morton Subotnick
- Amanda Stories
- American Poetry The Nineteenth Century
- Amnesty Interactive
- Baseball's Greatest Hits
- The Beat Experience
- The CD Companion to Beethoven's Ninth Symphony CD-ROM
- The CD Companion To Mozart's Dissonant Quartet
- The CD Companion to Dvorak The New World Symphony
- The CD Companion to Stravinsky's "The Rite of Spring"
- Cinema Volta – Weird Science & Childhood Memory
- Circus!: An Interactive Cartoon
- Comic Book Confidential
- The Complete Maus Count Down
- Criterion Goes to the Movies
- The Day After Trinity
- Dazzleoids
- Ephemeral Films 1931–1960 (incorporating two previously released titles, To New Horizons and You Can't Get There From Here)
- Exotic Japan – A Guide to Japanese Culture and Language by Nikki Yokokura
- First Emperor of China
- First Person: "Defending Human Attributes in the Age of the Machine" Donald Norman, three Norman books and a number of technical papers
- First Person: Mumia Abu-Jamal, Live from Death Row (Demo)
- First Person: The Society of Mind, starring Dr. Marvin Minsky (Demo)
- For All Mankind (Demo)
- If Monks Had Macs... (Demo)
- Invisible Universe, starring Dr. Fiorella Terenzi
- I Photograph To Remember / Fotografio Para Recordar
- Last Chance to See (Demo)
- Laurie Anderson's Puppet Motel
- Macbeth
- Mystery Science Theater 3000: The CD-ROM
- Our Secret Century: The Darker Side of the American Dream (12 discs, 2 unreleased, of films and collateral material from Prelinger Archives)
- Painters Painting
- Planetary Taxi
- People Weekly – 20 Amazing Years Of Pop Culture
- Poetry in Motion
- Poetry in Motion II
- The Residents Freak Show
- Rodney's Wonder Window
- Sacred and Secular: The Aerial Photography of Marilyn Bridges
- Salt of the Earth: A Film of Politics and Passion
- Shining Flower
- Silly Noisy House
- So I've Heard: A Collector's Guide to Compact Discs
- Stephen Jay Gould On Evolution
- Theatre of the Imagination: Radio Stories by Orson Welles and the Mercury Theatre
- This Is Spinal Tap
- The Trout Quintet
- Truths & Fictions – A Journey from Documentary to Digital Photography
- Understanding McLuhan (Demo)
- With Open Eyes: Images from the Art Institute of Chicago
- The Voyager Audiostack

=== CD-ROM (Distribution only) ===
- Blam! 1 CD-ROM

=== Expanded Books series ===
- Jurassic Park – Crichton, Michael
- The Complete Hitch Hiker's Guide to the Galaxy – Adams, Douglas (EB2)
- The Complete Annotated Alice in Wonderland – Carroll, Lewis, Intro & notes by Gardner, Martin (EB1)
- Virtual Light – Gibson, William (EB52)
- Neuromancer / Count Zero / Mona Lisa Overdrive – Gibson, William (EB15)
- Zen and the Art of Motorcycle Maintenance and Lila: An Inquiry into Morals – Pirsig, Robert (EB8)
- Genius: The Life and Science of Richard Feynman – Gleick, James
- Who Built America
- A Wrinkle in Time, A Wind in the Door, A Swiftly Tilting Planet, and Many Waters – L'Engle, Madeleine
- The Complete Stories, Volume 1 – Asimov, Isaac
- Invisible Man – Ellison, Ralph
- The Society of Mind – Minsky, Marvin
- Amusing Ourselves to Death – Postman, Neil and Brave New World - Huxley, Aldous
- Of Mice and Men, Cannery Row, the Red Pony, The Pearl – Steinbeck, John (Floppy Disk)
