= Steven C. Smith (author) =

American biographer of musicians

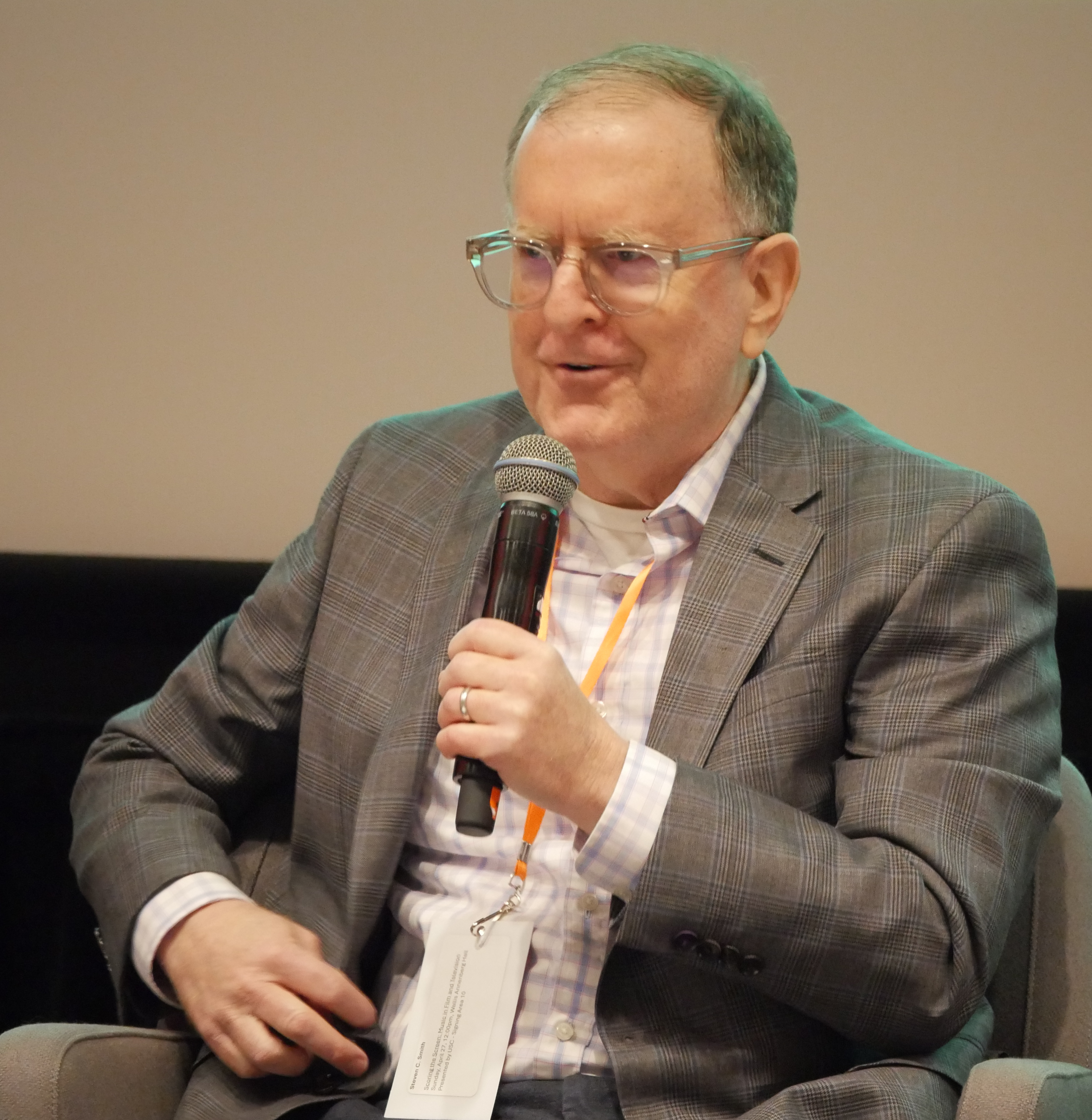
Photograph of Steven C. Smith

Steven C. Smith is an American biographer of musicians and the author of biographies of the Hollywood composers Bernard Herrmann and Max Steiner. Writing about Smith's biography of Steiner, Music by Max Steiner: The Epic Life of Hollywood’s Most Influential Composer, in Film Comment, the writer and critic Bruce Bennett comments on the "meticulously compiled trove of research and cannily contextualized analysis" that defines the book and writes Smith knits together Steiner's personal problems and professional successes in a way that closes out the biography with "honest irony and pathos". Jonathan Kirsch, in the Los Angeles Times, called Smith's 1991 biography on Hermann, A Heart at Fire's Center: The Life and Music of Bernard Herrmann, "disciplined and discerning" and that Smith allows us to see the tragedy that Hollywood composers live with, the homage and money they get versus the "respectability of a conductor’s baton and a symphony hall" that they want but cannot get. Smith received the ASCAP Deems Taylor Award for his Herrmann biography in 1992. Writing in Variety, Chris Willman says that Smith's Herrmann biography was responsible for "a huge uptick of interest in that once neglected, now practically deified film composer".

Smith also writes and produces documentaries and has received four Emmy nominations.
