= The Criterion Collection =

American home video distribution company

The Criterion Collection, Inc.
- Type: Private
- Industry: Motion picture video production
- Predecessor: FilmStruck
- Founded: 1984; 42 years ago
- Founders: Robert Stein; Aleen Stein; Joe Medjuck
- Headquarters: New York City, U.S.
- Area served: United Kingdom (Europe); United States, Canada (North America)
- Key people: Jonathan B. Turell (CEO); Peter Becker (president)
- Products: LaserDisc (1984–1999); VHS and Betamax (1985, 1989); DVD (1998–present); Blu-ray (2008–present); Ultra HD Blu-ray (2021–present); VOD (select titles) (2008–present); Criterion Channel (2019–present)
- Owner: The Voyager Company (1985–1997); Steven Rales (2024–present)
- Number of employees: 40
- Divisions: Eclipse from the Criterion Collection; Essential Art House from Janus Films
- Website: criterion.com

The Criterion Collection, Inc. (or simply Criterion) is an American home entertainment distribution company that focuses on licensing, restoring, and distributing "important classic and contemporary films". A "sister company" of arthouse film distributor Janus Films, Criterion serves film and media scholars, cinephiles, and public and academic libraries.

Criterion has helped to standardize certain aspects of home-video releases such as film restoration, the letterboxing format for widescreen films, and the inclusion of bonus features such as scholarly essays and documentary content about the films and filmmakers. Criterion most notably pioneered the use of commentary tracks.

Criterion has produced and distributed more than 1,500 special editions of its films in VHS, Betamax, LaserDisc, DVD, Blu-ray, and Ultra HD Blu-ray formats and box sets. The Criterion Collection includes titles by some 600 directors from more than 50 countries. Many of these films and their special features are also available via the Criterion Channel, an online streaming service the company has operated since April of 2019.

The Criterion Collection is considered one of the leading boutique Blu-ray labels. Each year, Criterion adds 50 to 60 titles to its catalog.

In the United States, their releases are distributed by Alliance Entertainment (no relation to the former Canadian company of the same name), via their Distribution Solutions division. In the United Kingdom, Spirit Entertainment handles distribution of Criterion titles since October 2023. UK distribution was previously through Sony Pictures Home Entertainment (SPHE) since 2016. In Canada, their releases are distributed by Unobstructed View since 2019, after their deal with Entertainment One expired.

== History ==
The company was founded in 1984 by Robert Stein, Aleen Stein, and Joe Medjuck, who later were joined by Roger Smith. In 1985, the Steins, William Becker, and Jonathan B. Turell founded the Voyager Company to publish educational multimedia CD-ROMs (1989–2000), and the Criterion Collection became a subordinate division of the Voyager Company, with Janus Films holding a minority stake in the company, and decided to expand its product on videocassettes and videodiscs.

In 1984, Citizen Kane was the first film the company released on Laserdisc, which included supplementary materials like a video essay and extensive liner notes on the provenance of the negative from which the restoration was made. In 1989, Voyager put out its first CD-ROM about Beethoven's ninth symphony. In March 1994, Verlagsgruppe Georg von Holtzbrinck GmbH bought 20% of Voyager for US$6.7 million; the four founders each retained a 20% owner's share.

In 1995, Aleen Stein resigned as President of Voyager, but remained a partner, and went on to found the Organa LLC multimedia publishing company. In November 1996, Bob Stein stepped down as company chief. In December 1996, it was announced Voyager would absorb Holtzbrinck's Electronic Publishing arm, with Holtzbrinck gaining two seats on Voyager's board. In 1997, the Voyager Company was dissolved.

The remaining three partners, Aleen Stein, Becker, and Turell owned the Criterion Collection company, which has a business partnership with Janus Films and had one with Home Vision Entertainment (HVE) until 2005, when Image Entertainment bought HVE. On November 4, 2013, it was announced Sony Pictures Home Entertainment (SPHE) would handle distribution. In May 2024, Janus Films and Criterion were acquired by Steven Rales, founder of Indian Paintbrush.

=== Home Vision Entertainment ===
In 1986, Charles Benton founded Home Vision Entertainment (HVE), the home-video division of Public Media Inc. (PMI), which he had previously founded in 1968. The HVE company sold, advertised, marketed, and distributed Criterion Collection DVDs, and also sold its own HVE brand of DVDs (co-produced with Criterion), including The Merchant Ivory Collection and the Classic Collection, a joint venture between HVE and Janus Films. The latter enterprise published HVE imprint films, for which Janus Films owned the video rights, but were unavailable from the Criterion Collection; however, Criterion published the Classic Collection films. In 2005, Image Entertainment bought HVE, making it the exclusive distributor of Criterion Collection products until 2013.

=== Online ventures and marketing ===
The Criterion Collection began to provide video-on-demand (VOD) in partnership with Mubi (formerly The Auteurs) in 2008. In February 2011, Criterion began switching its VOD offerings exclusively to Hulu Plus. In November 2016, FilmStruck, a film streaming service from Turner Classic Movies (TCM), succeeded Hulu as the exclusive streaming service for the Criterion Collection. Some Criterion films were streamed by Kanopy. In October 2018, Warner Bros. Digital Networks and Turner announced that FilmStruck would shut down on November 29. Criterion stated in a blog post that it was "trying to find ways we can bring our library and original content back to the digital space as soon as possible".

On November 16, 2018, Criterion announced the launch of the Criterion Channel as a standalone service, wholly owned and operated by the Criterion Collection, in the US and Canada. The service launched in 2019. Through a multi-year deal with HBO Max, some of Criterion's offerings are also available on the HBO streaming platform.

British film magazine Sight & Sound revealed in its April 2016 issue that Criterion would be expanding its releases to the UK. The first six titles were released on April 18, 2016.

The Criterion Closet is a film closet containing every title distributed by Criterion. It is located in Criterion's Manhattan headquarters and was made from a disused bathroom. Since 2010, Criterion regularly uploads videos of prominent film directors and actors (such as Martin Scorsese and Cate Blanchett) selecting films from the closet on their official YouTube channel. The first guest to be recorded in the closet was director Guillermo del Toro. In 2024, Criterion introduced a 18-foot delivery van containing all 1,500 films, the Criterion Closet, to celebrate its 40th anniversary.

In July 2025, Criterion agreed to pay US$4.5 million to settle a class action lawsuit alleging it unlawfully shared subscriber information with third parties including Meta and Twilio.

In February 2026, it was announced that two Netflix releases, Guillermo del Toro’s Frankenstein and KPop Demon Hunters, were being added to the Criterion Collection, given both films' Academy Award nominations and the latter becoming Netflix's most popular film. Original Netflix titles are largely limited to streaming, but partnership with Criterion allows them to receive physical releases. This first happened in 2020 with Roma (spine #1014), followed by Marriage Story (spine #1038), and The Irishman (spine #1058).

In April 2026, Criterion’s The Wes Anderson Archive: Ten Films, Twenty-Five Years box set won the "Title of the Year" award at the annual Home Entertainment Media Play Awards.

== Contributions and influence ==
=== Letterboxing ===
With its eighth LaserDisc release, Invasion of the Body Snatchers (1956), Criterion introduced the letterbox format, which added black bars to the top and bottom of the 4:3 standard television set to preserve the original aspect ratio of the film, rather than cropping the image to fit a standard television display. Thereafter, Criterion made letterboxing the standard presentation for all its releases of films shot in widescreen aspect ratios.

=== Commentary soundtracks ===
In 1984, the Criterion Collection's second LaserDisc title, King Kong (1933), was the debut of the scene-specific audio commentary contained in a separate analog channel of the LaserDisc, in which American film historian Ronald Haver spoke about the production, cast, screenplay, production design, and special effects. He also provides commentary on the LaserDisc editions of Casablanca (1942), Here Comes Mr. Jordan (1941), Singin' in the Rain (1952),, and The Wizard of Oz (1939).

Typically, the chapter-indexed commentaries are exclusive to the Criterion releases and their initial DVD reissues; they became collector's items when the original studios reissued titles previously licensed to Criterion, regardless of whether new commentary tracks were produced.

Adding directors' commentary tracks as bonus material was another Criterion innovation. Some of the earliest were recorded by Martin Scorsese for the Taxi Driver, Raging Bull, and Lucky Me LaserDiscs from Criterion.

=== Special editions ===
The Criterion Collection began in 1984 with the releases of Citizen Kane (1941) and then King Kong (1933) on LaserDisc, the latter's source negatives courtesy of the Library of Congress. The company later became known for pioneering the "special edition" DVD concept containing bonus materials such as trailers, commentaries, documentaries, alternate endings, and deleted scenes. The success of these releases established the special-edition version in the DVD business. In 2007, taking advantage of advanced film-transfer and film-restoration technologies, Criterion published higher-quality versions, with bonus materials, of early catalog titles such as Amarcord (1973), Brazil (1985), and Seven Samurai (1954).

=== Film restoration ===
Originally, the Criterion Collection focused on releasing world cinema, mainstream cinema classics, and critically successful obscure films. Using the best available source materials, the company produced technologically improved and cleaner versions, such as those for The Passion of Joan of Arc (1928), M (1931), Children of Paradise (1945), The Third Man (1949), Seven Samurai (1954), and Amarcord (1973).

Almost every title contains film-cleaning and film-restoration essays in the booklets, while some even have featurettes comparing the restored and unrestored images. In 1989, the company released Ghostbusters (1984), a controversial choice at the time, as it was a comedy starring Bill Murray that grossed more than $200 million at the box office. In an attempt to "curb its stuffy image," Criterion increasingly released art, genre, and mainstream movies on LaserDisc, such as Halloween (1978) in 1994, Bram Stoker's Dracula (1992), Armageddon (1998) in 1999, and The Rock (1996) in 2001.

=== Licenses ===
Some previously licensed Criterion Collection titles, such The Harder They Come (1972), have gone out of print. Titles such as RoboCop (1987), Hard Boiled (1992), The Killer (1989), and Grand Illusion (1937) became unavailable when their publishing licenses expired or when Criterion published improved versions, such as those for Beauty and the Beast (1946), M (1931), The Wages of Fear (1953), and Seven Samurai (1954). As of October 2023, over 200 of the 384 titles from the List of Criterion Collection Laserdisc releases have been re-released.

Another example is the film Charade (1963), which had become a public-domain property for lacking the legally-required copyright notice. Criterion produced a restored edition under license from Universal Pictures for the initial edition and for the later anamorphic widescreen re-release edition of the film.

Periodically, Criterion releases material on DVD and Blu-ray disc licensed from the studios with whom the company had previously dealt (such as Universal's and Terry Gilliam's 1985 film Brazil); these new releases are generally undertaken on a case-by-case basis.

Criterion released its first Walt Disney Pictures title, Andrew Stanton's WALL-E (2008), in 2022. This was not the result of an ongoing deal between Disney (who has maintained a relationship with the distributor for titles from Touchstone Pictures and, since 2019, 20th Century Studios) and Criterion, but rather licensed as a one-off, with Stanton approaching Criterion and "wanting to be part of the club".

In 2023, Criterion announced it would be working with Janus Films to create Janus Contemporaries, a home-video line for first-run international releases.

=== Representation ===
Beginning in 2018 via streaming service FilmStruck, Criterion started offering curated film collections organized around queer themes for the month of June in recognition of Pride Month. Since FilmStruck shut down in November 2018 and Criterion debuted its own streaming service, The Criterion Channel, in April 2019, Criterion now offers dozens of queer features, documentaries, and shorts for Pride Month each year.

In 2020, after a The New York Times article titled “How the Criterion Collection Crops Out African-American Directors” was published, Peter Becker, Criterion’s president at the time, admitted to what he called his “blind spots.” Subsequently, and in response to the murder of George Floyd, Becker said in a 2024 interview with The NYT, the company would correct course. Since then, it has released additional films by Steve McQueen and Ousmane Sembène as well as added films from Marlon Riggs, Cheryl Dunye, and others.

Since 2020, Ashley Clark has worked at Criterion, having previously worked in film programming at the Brooklyn Academy of Music (BAM). In 2020, Spike Lee's then the out-of-print film Bamboozled (2000) was added to the collection in 2K restoration with an essay from Clark. He has since become the curatorial director of the Criterion Collection.

== Formats ==
All Criterion titles are numbered, which is shown on the bottom of the spine of the packaging. Though the bulk of Criterion's catalog is of live-action films, they have also released animated films (such as Fantastic Planet, Fantastic Mr. Fox, WALL-E, and Flow), television series (such as Tanner '88, Fishing with John, and select episodes of I Love Lucy and The Addams Family).

=== LaserDisc and VHS/Betamax ===
The original "Criterion" logo

The Criterion Collection began publishing LaserDiscs on December 1, 1984, with its release of Citizen Kane, until March 16, 1999, with Michael Bay's Armageddon (spine #384). Three of the company's early titles (The 39 Steps, The Lady Vanishes, and The Third Man) were also issued on VHS and Betamax. These were Criterion's only releases on those formats—other Janus/Criterion titles were often released to VHS through Home Vision Entertainment.

=== DVD and Blu-ray ===
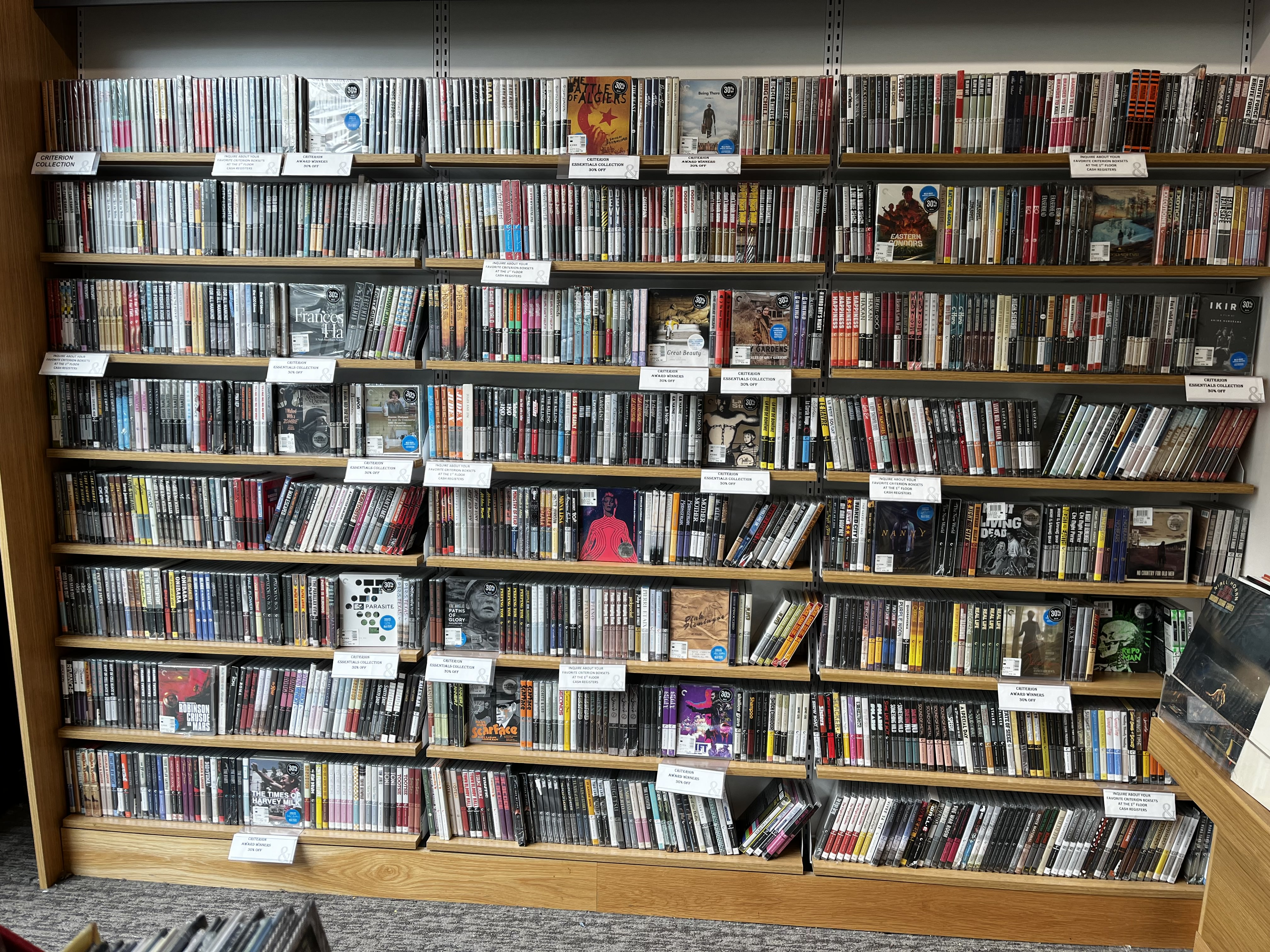
Criterion Collection section at Barnes & Noble

Criterion entered the DVD market in 1998 with a reset numbering system, beginning with Seven Samurai, spine #2 (Grand Illusion, spine #1, was delayed for a year while restoration was underway on a then-newly-found camera negative). As with its laserdiscs, Criterion's early DVD editions of widescreen films were presented in the letterbox format, but Criterion did not anamorphically enhance its discs for 16:9 monitors until mid-1999 with its release of Insomnia (spine #47).

Criterion was slow to expand into high-definition releases, partly because of the HD format war between Blu-ray and HD DVD. Once Blu-ray emerged as the industry-standard high-definition home-video format, Criterion began to release Blu-ray editions of select films from its collection, beginning with the Blu-ray release of Wong Kar-wai's Chungking Express (spine #453) in December 2008.

Despite the emergence of Blu-ray as the industry-standard high-definition format, Janus/Criterion continued to support the DVD format. Most of their new Blu-ray releases were accompanied by a standard-definition DVD version. In 2013, about 60% of the discs sold by Criterion were Blu-rays, while 40% were DVDs. "Dual format" packages that contained both DVD and Blu-ray discs were briefly experimented with between November 2013 with their release of the Zatoichi boxset (spine #679), up through September 2014 with All That Jazz (spine #724), in response to negative customer feedback.

Aside from the core catalog, the company has also released films through its Essential Art House, Eclipse, Merchant Ivory, and Janus Contemporaries lines, as well as a few releases outside of any product line. Many of these releases have also been collected and sold in various box sets.

In early 2016, for the first time in its history, Criterion announced it would begin releasing its catalogue outside of the US and Canada (earlier international Criterion titles, such as the Japanese LaserDisc of Blade Runner, were licensed to other companies). In partnership with Sony Pictures Home Entertainment, releases began to be distributed with the launch of six titles in the U.K. during the month. When SPHE moved to Elevation Sales in the UK, the distribution moved to Spirit Entertainment.

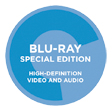
A Criterion Collection logotype: Blu-ray Criterion label, dates from the first movies released on December 16, 2008.

Criterion's DVD releases are Region 1 DVDs. Blu-ray discs are Region A-locked in North America or Region B-locked in the UK (though there are exceptions).

==== Ultra HD Blu-ray ====
In August 2021, Criterion announced it would begin publishing titles on the Ultra HD Blu-ray (4K) format in November 2021. Almost all Criterion Ultra HD Blu-ray releases will include both a 4K copy and a regular Blu-ray copy of a film (with special features on the regular Blu-ray), with select releases including Dolby Vision HDR and Dolby Atmos. The first films to be released in this format included Citizen Kane (spine #1104, returning to the collection for the first time since 1992), Mulholland Drive, and Menace II Society.

The company also released The Red Shoes, A Hard Day's Night, The Celebration, The Piano, and others on Ultra HD Blu-ray disc by January 2022. The 2019 film Uncut Gems (spine #1101), which was previously planned for a remastered Blu-ray release in October 2021, was delayed until November to also give the film an Ultra HD Blu-ray release.

=== Streaming as the Criterion Channel ===
Criterion had provided titles for streaming video-on-demand (VOD) through partnerships with other companies, such as Mubi (formerly The Auteurs, 2008), Hulu (2011–2016) and TCM's FilmStruck (2016–2018). After FilmStruck announced it would be shutting down in November 2018, Criterion stated in a blog post that it was "trying to find ways we can bring our library and original content back to the digital space as soon as possible".

A month later, Criterion announced their own standalone subscription service, the Criterion Channel, available to subscribers in the US and Canada. The service began on April 8, 2019. The Channel's offerings include classic and contemporary Criterion and Janus films and shorts, rotating playlists from studios and indies, temporarily licensed films (and some television offerings), and supplementary features (which include trailers, behind-the-scenes documentaries, interviews, video essays, commentary tracks, and archival footage). Criterion also maintains a close relationship with Warner Bros. Discovery's streaming platform HBO Max, which frequently also houses Criterion-released titles.

== See also ==
- List of films in the Criterion Collection
- Criterion Closet
