= Places in the works of Madeleine L'Engle =

Madeleine L'Engle has published more than fifty books, including twenty-three novels, virtually all of them interconnected by recurring characters and locales. In particular, L'Engle's three major series have a consistent geography, including a number of significant fictional locations. These generally fall into two categories:

- Fictionalized versions of real locations, such as the homes of the Murry and Austin families. They are usually based on actual places L'Engle lived.
- Exotic locations in other countries, on other planets and elsewhere, usually with a symbolic name that relates to a major feature of the locale. These places help to illustrate the themes of their respective novels.

Major fictional locations in L'Engle's novels include the following places, grouped by the series in which they appear.

== Time Quartet ==
=== On Earth ===
- The Murry farmhouse – The Murry farmhouse is somewhere in New England. It is the starting and ending point for each of the books in the Time Quintet. The Murry farmhouse is nearly two centuries old as of A Wrinkle in Time, contains a pantry that has been converted into Dr. Kate Murry's laboratory. As an adolescent, Meg Murry has her bedroom in the attic. Outside, a vegetable garden is tended by Sandy and Dennys Murry, who eventually grow Christmas trees instead once they go off to college. After the twins move away and the trees are sold, their parents reinstate the vegetable garden on a smaller scale. At the edge of the property is a stone wall, inhabited by a snake called Louise the Larger, and a glacial boulder called the "star-watching rock". In later years, the house features an indoor swimming pool that connects to a "time gate", linking the present to a time approximately three thousand years earlier, when the area was inhabited by the fictional People of the Wind. Beyond this rural setting, small, worn-down mountains can be seen (based on Litchfield Hills), which according to An Acceptable Time were larger and snow-capped 3,000 years ago. The house and the nearby star-watching rock have parallels in both the Austin family series of books and in L'Engle's actual Connecticut home, Crosswicks, a farmhouse dating back to 1770. Like the similar house owned by the Austin family, the Murry house lies outside a small village, served by a regional high school. Unlike the Austins' village, however, the one near the Murry home is not named in the books.
- Vespugia – Vespugia is a fictional country in South America, home of the dictator Mad Dog Branzillo in A Swiftly Tilting Planet, and later visited by Vicky Austin in Troubling a Star. L'Engle explains in Walking on Water that Vespugia is "set in the middle of what used to be called Patagonia, a sizeable area along what are now the boundaries of Chile and Argentina." L'Engle's husband, Hugh Franklin, is credited with having named Vespugia.

=== Other planets ===
When Meg, Calvin and Charles Wallace travel to other planets, the ones whose names are given include the following:

- Camazotz – Camazotz is a planet of extreme, enforced conformity, ruled by a disembodied brain called IT. Meg's father, Dr. Alex Murry, is imprisoned there for a time, inside a building called "CENTRAL Central Intelligence". Camazotz is described as being similar to Earth, with familiar birch, pines, and maple trees, an ordinary hill on which the children arrive, and a town with smokestacks, which "might have been one of any number of familiar towns". Its ordinary appearance becomes less so as the children see that everything is endlessly duplicated without variation (except for one non-conforming boy, who is later punished). Thus, the houses are "all exactly alike, small square boxes painted gray"; this characterization has been compared with "the burgeoning American suburbia" such as the post-war housing developments of Levittown, Pennsylvania. The people who live in the houses are similarly described, with "mother figures" who "all gave the appearance of being the same". Camazotz has also been compared with "an early sixties American image of life in a Communist state", a characterization partially dismissed as too glib. It is stated that Camazotz is a planet that has "given into the Black Thing" which implies that it was once a free world that was conquered by the Black Thing, which gave rise to IT's presence on the planet. The world is said to have a psychological significance for the character Meg, in that the pressure to conform there is similar to the pressures she faces in the small town where she lives. The name Camazotz refers to a Mayan bat god.
- Ixchel – Ixchel is a planet of muted colors, inhabited by tall, motherly, sightless creatures with tentacles. Named by the author for Ixchel, a Mayan moon goddess, it orbits the same sun as Camazotz.
- Uriel – Uriel is a planet with extremely tall mountains, an allusion to the Archangel Uriel. It is inhabited by creatures that resemble winged centaurs, and identified as the third planet of the star Malak in the spiral nebula Messier 101. The site of Mrs Whatsit's temporary transformation into one of these winged creatures, it is the place where "the guardian angels" [i.e. the Mrs Ws, who are explicitly referred to as such by Calvin later in the book] "show the questers a vision of the universe that is obscured on earth."

They also stop briefly on an unnamed two-dimensional planet and on an unnamed planet in Orion's belt, the latter of which is the home of the Happy Medium.

=== Other places ===
Two places visited by Meg and Calvin in A Wind in the Door do not fit neatly into either of the above two categories.

- Yadah – Yadah is the home of the farandolae Senex and Sporos, located in a mitochondrion inside one of Charles Wallace's cells. The site of the decisive battle against the Echthroi in A Wind in the Door, it serves to demonstrate L'Engle's premise that variations in size "are in reality, quite unimportant," as Blajeny states in the book; and that macrocosm and microcosm are both part of the interdependence of everything in the Cosmos. "If a butterfly winging over the fields around Crosswicks should be hurt, the effect would be felt in galaxies thousands of light years away," L'Engle says in A Stone for a Pillow. "The interrelationship of all of Creation is sensitive in a way we are just beginning to understand." The name comes from a Hebrew verb meaning "to extend the hand", and by extension, "to worship with extended hand".
- Metron Ariston – Metron Ariston is not an objectively real place, but "an idea, a postulatum" visited by Meg and Calvin in A Wind in the Door. As posited by Blajeny and seen by Meg, it has Meg's star-watching rock, but the stars above correspond to "the Mondrion solar system in the Veganuel galaxy", Blajeny's home galaxy. The use of this theoretical rather than actual location allows beings of disparate sizes — humans, Blajeny (a giant by human standards), a "singular cherubim" and a farandola — to interact without regard to problems of scale.

== Polly O'Keefe series ==
As newlyweds, Calvin O'Keefe and his wife Meg live in an apartment near the unnamed hospital where Calvin works. By the time of The Arm of the Starfish, about twelve to thirteen years later, the family has settled on the first of two fictional islands. Calvin, Charles and Polly also travel to other places in some of the novels.

- Gaea – Gaea is a fictional island off the coast of Portugal, where the O'Keefes live as far as possible from the recently developed tourist area, represented by a new hotel owned by Typhon Cutter. The island, which consists largely of sand dunes, grasses and jungle trees and vines, is filled with light, and with colorful birds and butterflies. It also contains a circle of standing stones, with a stone altar in the center; a small cemetery, and a village of Gaean natives with their own language and customs. The younger O'Keefe children (e.g. Johnny and Rosy) were born on Gaea. The name comes from Gaea, an "Earth mother" figure from Greek mythology.
- Benne Seed Island – Benne Seed Island is off the coast of South Carolina, a few hours' drive from Charleston, South Carolina. The O'Keefes move there about a year after the events of The Arm of the Starfish. They live in a converted hotel at one end of the island; at the other end is the village of Mulletville and the pink three-story mansion of Beau Allaire, home of Maximiliana Horne. The O'Keefe and Mulletville children attend school in fictional Cowpertown on the nearby mainland. Benne seeds are another name for sesame seeds, as used in Southern cuisine.
- Osia Theola, Cyprus – Osia Theola is the site of conference attended by Polly in A House Like a Lotus. Literally means "holy, divine speech." Said to be where a woman named Theola had a vision in a cave, "early in the Christian era"; a church was built over the cave and the village there was named for the woman with the vision.
- Lago de Los Dragones (Dragonlake) – Lago de Los Dragones is a fictional lake in Venezuela, home of the fictional Quiztano Indians. The Quiztanos live primarily in "round, airy straw houses with peaked roofs" raised on stilts over the lake. Two larger buildings on shore constitute the Caring Places, the Quiztano equivalent of a hospital. Oil wells stand at the other end of the lake; that part of the lake is polluted, with cases of mercury poisoning reported.
- Puerto de Los Dragones (Port of Dragons) – Puerto de Los Dragones is the nearest port to Lago de Los Dragones in Venezuela, toured by Calvin O'Keefe in Dragons in the Waters. Port of Dragons, described as being "near the border" and having "a sizable band of Cubans in the hills", is a jumble of rich residents in villas and poor people in tin shacks, supported (and heavily polluted) by the oil industry. The other major industry appears to be smuggling – of art, drugs and other commodities. Miss Leonis Phair stays at the Hotel de Lago there. One point of interest is the Plaza Bolivar. Heavily armed guards and police are a common sight. Both the port and the lake names refer to dragons in the waters, from the Biblical quotation "Thou didst divide the sea through thy power; thou breakest the heads of the dragons in the waters" (Psalms 74:13, KJV), quoted by Miss Leonis at the end of the book.

== Austin family series ==
Cover of the 1997 Farrar, Straus & Giroux edition of Meet the Austins by Madeleine L'Engle, depicting Seven Bay Island. Cover illustration by Dennis Nolan.

- Thornhill, Connecticut – Thornhill is the village near which the Austins live in most of the books. The Austin home is akin to the Murry farmhouse and to Crosswicks in size, age and environs; for example, all three have a "star-watching rock" out back. The Austin house is outside Thornhill, at the end of a dirt road that intersects the "old Boston Post Road". The Austins have an old barn, in which Vicky's brother John works on building a mock-up of a space suit. Dr. Austin sees patients a few evenings a week in his office at one end of the house, which has its own entrance. A short drive from the Austin house is Hawk Mountain (apparently a fictionalized version of Mohawk Mountain near Cornwall, Connecticut), another place the family goes to talk and look at stars. The nearby town is Clovenford, where Dr. Austin works at the regional hospital. The state in which Thornhill is located is not initially given, but in The Moon by Night John Austin tells Zachary Gray that the family is from Connecticut. L'Engle and her family, the Franklins, lived in a similar Connecticut locale when Meet the Austins was written. In a 1995 introduction to the Austin family paperbacks, L'Engle states that "Indeed, the Austins do a great many things that my family did, including living in a small dairy farm village." L'Engle also mentions Clovenford in a fictional incident in A Circle of Quiet (p. 87).
- Seven Bay Island – Seven Bay Island is a fictional island about two days' drive from Thornhill, home of Reverend Eaton, Vicky's maternal grandfather, and of Leo Rodney. The exact state is not given, but L'Engle describes is as be "an island off the New England coast". Appears in Meet the Austins and The Moon by Night, and is the setting of A Ring of Endless Light. Seven Bay is reached by ferry, and is said to be the third and last stop on the ferry's outbound route.
- Vespugia – Vespugia is the fictional country in South America, first mentioned in A Swiftly Tilting Planet, is visited by Vicky Austin in Troubling a Star, en route to Antarctica. It is shown as having at least one step pyramid. More important to the book and the L'Engle corpus, Vespugia by the time Vicky arrives is no longer governed by El Zarco (Madoc Branzillo), the benign leader who replaced evil "Mad Dog" through the efforts of Charles Wallace. Instead, General Guedder (a descendant of the malevolent Gedder from A Swiftly Tilting Planet) has established a totalitarian regime, funded in part by international trade in illegal drugs. Guedder's Vespugia hopes to gain power in the world community by controlling and exploiting as much of Antarctica as possible. The name references the explorer Amerigo Vespucci, after whom the American continents were named. It is evidently a small country, "very hot in the summer and very cold in the winter" located between Chile and Argentina, who have been "nibbling" at Vespugia's borders for centuries. The Spanish Inquisition was once powerful there, torturing and killing the native Indians and destroying native religious sites and artifacts.
- Eddington Point, Antarctica – Eddington Point is the fictional location of LeNoir Station, a small scientific research station staffed primarily by Americans in Troubling a Star. Eddington Point was named after Adam Eddington's uncle and namesake, a marine biologist who was murdered in Antarctica. The younger Adam is stationed there in Troubling a Star, but is mysteriously absent when Vicky arrives.

== Other significant places ==
In addition to the many fictional locations, L'Engle has set parts of her novels in a number of real places, including the following:

- Athens, Greece – Athens is where Polly meets Zachary Gray in A House Like a Lotus.
- Beja, Portugal – Beja is where Charlotte Napier flees during a crisis in her marriage and reads the Letters of a Portuguese Nun in L'Engle's adult novel The Love Letters (1966).
- Lisbon, Portugal – Lisbon is where Adam Eddington rescues Polly O'Keefe but gets ensnared by the Cutters in The Arm of the Starfish.
- Madrid, Spain – Madrid is where the plane that carried Adam Eddington, Canon Tallis, and Polly is temporarily stranded in The Arm of the Starfish.
- New York City – New York City is L'Engle's birthplace, home of Adam Eddington, Camilla Dickinson, Katherine Forrester Vigneras, and even the Austins for one year. A specific location within the city, the Cathedral of Saint John the Divine, New York, is the primary setting for The Young Unicorns and A Severed Wasp. L'Engle herself was writer-in-residence at the cathedral for many years.
- Switzerland – Switzerland is the site of at least two fictional boarding schools in L'Engle's early novels (notably The Small Rain and And Both Were Young), based on one that L'Engle herself attended. Also the setting of the adult novel A Winter's Love.
