= Time Quintet =

Series of science fantasy novels by Madeleine L'Engle

- Spines of the first four books in the Time Quintet in their original hardback dust jackets
- A Wrinkle in Time (1962); A Wind in the Door (1973); A Swiftly Tilting Planet (1978); Many Waters (1986); An Acceptable Time (1989)
- Author: Madeleine L'Engle
- Country: United States
- Language: English
- Genre: Young adult, science fantasy
- Publisher: Farrar, Straus and Giroux
- Published: 1962–1989
- Media type: Print (Hardback & Paperback)

The Time Quintet is a science fantasy series of five young adult novels written by American author Madeleine L'Engle and made up of A Wrinkle in Time (1962), A Wind in the Door (1973), A Swiftly Tilting Planet (1978), Many Waters (1986), and An Acceptable Time (1989).

== Publishing history ==
The series originated with A Wrinkle in Time, written from 1959 to 1960 and turned down by 26 publishers before Farrar, Straus and Giroux finally published it in 1962. A Wrinkle in Time won the Newbery Medal and has sold over 6 million copies. The sequel, A Wind in the Door, takes place a year later but was published over a decade later, in 1973. A Swiftly Tilting Planet, set ten years after A Wrinkle in Time, followed in 1978. The fourth title, Many Waters, was published in 1986, but takes place before A Swiftly Tilting Planet. (This is apparent as Sandy and Dennys Murry are in high school as of Many Waters, but in college at the time of A Swiftly Tilting Planet. As of Many Waters, Meg is also unmarried.) The final title in the series is An Acceptable Time, published in 1989.

All five titles have been published in numerous editions over the years, with varying in cover art and, in 1997, a new introduction by L'Engle for the Dell Laurel-Leaf paperbacks. The books have also been packaged as a box set, first (before the publication of Many Waters) as the Time Trilogy, next as the Time Quartet, and finally in its entirety as the Time Quintet.

In May 2007, the books were reissued under the Square Fish imprint in both mass market and trade paperback form. Both editions include new cover art, "An Appreciation by Anna Quindlen", a "Questions for the Author" interview, and the text of Madeleine L'Engle's Newbery Medal acceptance speech, published under the title "The Expanding Universe".

== Overview ==
This series follows the lives of Meg Murry, her youngest brother Charles Wallace Murry, and their friend Calvin O'Keefe as they try to save the world from evil forces. The remaining Murry siblings, twins Sandy and Dennys Murry, take up the struggle in one volume from which the other protagonists are largely absent. A further book about Polyhymnia O'Keefe, the eldest child of Meg and Calvin, features several characters from the other novels and completes the Time Quintet.

=== A Wrinkle in Time ===
A Wrinkle in Time is the story of Meg Murry, a middle-school-aged girl who is transported on an adventure through time and space with her younger brother Charles Wallace, her friend Calvin O'Keefe and three mystical beings called Mrs. Whatsit, Mrs. Who and Mrs. Which. They help them to rescue her father, a gifted scientist, from the evil forces that hold him prisoner on another planet.

=== A Wind in the Door ===
Meg, Calvin and the disagreeable school principal Mr. Jenkins have to travel inside one of Charles Wallace's mitochondria to save him from a deadly disease, part of a cosmic battle against the evil Echthroi and the forces of "Unnaming".

=== A Swiftly Tilting Planet ===
Charles Wallace must save the world from nuclear war by going back in time and changing might-have-beens, accompanied in spirit (through kything) by Meg at home.

=== Many Waters ===
Twins Dennys and Sandy accidentally play around with their father's computer, sending them into Mr. Murry's experiment and back in time to the pre-flood days of Noah. They befriend his family, a group of seraphim, and some miniature mammoths.

=== An Acceptable Time ===
Meg and Calvin's eldest daughter, Polyhymnia O'Keefe, visits her maternal grandparents only to find herself trapped 3,000 years in the past, caught up in a struggle between the People of the Wind and the warlike, drought-stricken People Across the Lake.

== Setting ==
The exact time period is indeterminate, but the novels seem to take place in the 1960s and 1970s. Since the series was written over the course of decades, it is not possible to establish an exact year in which each story takes place; historical events mentioned in the books (such as the dates of the Apollo space program and the name of the President of the United States) do not always correspond to the "real world". In recognition of this, and of the cosmic nature of the series, the inside front cover of Many Waters states that the series is set in Kairos, a way of looking at time as "real time, pure numbers with no measurement", reflecting her belief that "God's time and our time are not the same".

Each of the books contains instances of "tessering" (folding spacetime), carrying the protagonists to metaphysical battlegrounds in the cosmic struggle between good and evil. The eponymous "wrinkle in time" is a short hop to the immediate past engineered by the Mrs. Ws to allow Meg, Calvin and Charles Wallace to accomplish their mission and return before they are missed at home.

The world of L'Engle's characters is filled with fictional place names, often taken from mythological figures with a symbolic relationship to the locale. For example, the planet Ixchel in A Wrinkle in Time, where Meg is cared for by a motherly sightless creature with tentacles, is named for the Mayan goddess Ixchel. Other, more mundane locations are often fictionalized versions of places L'Engle has lived or visited in the real world, such as L'Engle's Connecticut home, which that of the Murry family resembles.

== Characters ==
The main characters (protagonists) in the Time Quintet are:

- Margaret "Meg" Murry is the eldest child of scientists Alex and Kate Murry. Mathematically brilliant but less than adept at other subjects in school, Meg is awkward, unpopular, and defensive around authority figures, but gets along well with her family and friend Calvin O'Keefe. Meg is initially unhappy with her physical appearance, particularly her unruly hair, braces and glasses. She outgrows most of these limitations in the course of the books, although she never completely overcomes her inferiority complex. By the time of A Swiftly Tilting Planet she is married to Calvin and expecting her first child who is revealed to be Polly in An Acceptable Time.
- Charles Wallace Murry is the youngest Murry child, described by his mother as "different" and "new." Charles Wallace did not talk at all until he was nearly four years old, at which time he began to speak in complete sentences. Charles can empathically and telepathically "read" certain people's thoughts and feelings, and is extremely intelligent.
- Calvin O'Keefe is the third eldest of Paddy and Branwen O'Keefe's eleven children, a tall, thin, red-haired 14-year-old high school junior (as of the first book) who plays on the school basketball team. Neglected by his own family, Calvin joyfully enters the lives of the Murrys. By the time of A Swiftly Tilting Planet he is married to Meg, holds two doctorates, and is presenting an academic paper on chordates.
- Alexander "Sandy" and Dennys Murry — Younger than Meg but older than Charles Wallace, the twin sons describe themselves as the "squares" of the Murry clan. This changes somewhat when, as teenagers, they are transported to the time immediately preceding the Deluge in Many Waters. In the remaining volumes of the Time Quintet, they are the realists of the family, and tend to be skeptical about Meg and Charles Wallace's accounts and theories about what is happening. In later life, as seen in the O'Keefe series of books, particularly A House Like a Lotus, Sandy is an "anti-corporate" lawyer, and Dennys is a neurosurgeon.
- Polyhymnia O'Keefe is the protagonist of An Acceptable Time, the fifth book in the Time Quintet. The eldest child of Meg and Calvin, she is born shortly after the events of A Swiftly Tilting Planet. Intelligent and widely traveled, Poly speaks numerous languages. In her first three appearances (The Arm of the Starfish, Dragons in the Waters and A House Like a Lotus), she has not yet settled on a specific career path, but may have found her calling as of the end of An Acceptable Time.

== Themes ==
The Time Quintet shows themes of love, loss, friendship, loneliness and the triumph of good over evil. L'Engle often borrows elements from the Bible in a way similar to C. S. Lewis, one of her favorite authors. In A Wrinkle in Time, for example, the beautiful creatures of Uriel sing a psalm, and Mrs. Who quotes St. Paul; and angelic characters — the three "Mrs. Ws", the "singular cherubim" Proginoskes, and the seraph Adnarel (who aids just Sandy and Dennys, in “Many Waters”), among others — aid the Murrys and Calvin, but still leave the humans to make their own difficult choices. Another theme which echoes Lewis's work is that phenomena which human perception classifies as "science", "religion" and "magic" are in actuality part of a single seamless reality.

== Related series ==
L'Engle has written four books featuring the children of Calvin and Meg O'Keefe, especially their eldest daughter, Polyhymnia O'Keefe, and their eldest son, Charles. These are, in order of both publication and character chronology:

- The Arm of the Starfish (1965) ISBN 0-374-30396-7
- Dragons in the Waters (1976) ISBN 0-374-31868-9
- A House Like a Lotus (1984) ISBN 0-374-33385-8
- An Acceptable Time (1989) ISBN 0-374-30027-5

These also take place in a Kairos framework, although only The Arm of the Starfish and An Acceptable Time have the characteristic science fantasy elements to any great extent. Taken together, the eight books are called the "Murry–O'Keefe" series. The O'Keefe books further connect, through such characters as Adam Eddington, Canon Tallis and Zachary Gray, to the Austin family series of books, which take place primarily in "chronos" (or "ordinary, wrist-watch" time). Further overlaps between characters connect virtually every L'Engle novel into one large series of books.

== Movie adaptations ==
In 2003, A Wrinkle in Time was adapted into a television movie by Disney. A 2018 film adaptation of the same book directed by Ava DuVernay was released by Walt Disney Studios Motion Pictures.

== See also ==
- Tesseract
