= A Swiftly Tilting Planet =

1978 science fiction novel by Madeleine L'Engle

- First edition cover
- Author: Madeleine L'Engle
- Cover artist: Diane Dillon (first ed.)
- Language: English
- Series: Time Quintet
- Genre: Young adult, Science fiction
- Publisher: Farrar, Straus and Giroux
- Publication date: July 1, 1978
- Publication place: United States
- Media type: Print (hardback & paperback)
- Pages: 304 pp
- ISBN: 0-374-37362-0
- OCLC: 167766231
- Preceded by: A Wind in the Door
- Followed by: Many Waters

A Swiftly Tilting Planet is a science fiction novel by American author Madeleine L'Engle, the third book in the Time Quintet. It was first published in 1978 with cover art by Diane Dillon.

The book's title is an allusion to the poem "Morning Song of Senlin" by Conrad Aiken.

== Plot summary ==
The book opens on Thanksgiving evening, 10 years after the events of A Wind in the Door. Meg is now married to Calvin and is expecting their first child. Calvin has become a scientist and is in Britain at a conference; Calvin's mother Branwen Maddox O'Keefe joins Meg's family for Thanksgiving dinner. When they receive the news of impending nuclear war caused by the dictator "Mad Dog Branzillo", Mrs. O'Keefe lays a charge on Charles Wallace of Patrick's Rune, a rhyming prayer of protection inherited from her Irish grandmother.

Charles Wallace goes to the star-watching rock, a family haunt, where his recitation summons a winged unicorn named Gaudior, who explains to Charles Wallace that he must prevent nuclear war by traveling through time and telepathically merging with people who lived near the star-watching rock at points in the past.

They are threatened along the way by the Echthroi, the antagonists introduced in A Wind in the Door, who now seek to alter history in their favor. Gaudior and Charles Wallace's travels bring them to Harcels, a Native American boy at least 1,000 years in the past; Madoc of Wales, a pre-Columbian trans-oceanic traveler; Brandon Llawcae, a Welsh settler in Puritan times; Mrs. O'Keefe's brother Chuck Maddox, during their childhood; and Matthew Maddox, a writer during the American Civil War.

Throughout their journey, Meg connects with Charles Wallace from home through "kything", the telepathic communication she learned in A Wind in the Door. Gradually, it is revealed that Branzillo is a descendant of Madoc through all Charles' other alter-egos, and of Madoc's treacherous brother Gwydyr. Ultimately, Charles' manipulation of Branzillo's various ancestors results in the re-union of Madoc's line and the transformation of the present Branzillo into an advocate of peace, to prevent the war.

=== The Rune Resembling St. Patrick's Rune ===
Throughout the story, Charles Wallace invokes this poem to ensure the victory of good. The poem features in several parts of the book, each with slightly different wording or different punctuation; the poem's definite composition is unsure.

With Ananda** in this fateful hour,
I place all Heaven with its power,
And the sun with its brightness,
And the snow with its whiteness,
And the fire with all the strength it hath,
And the lightning with its rapid wrath,
And the winds with their swiftness along its path,
And the sea with its deepness,
And the rocks with their steepness,
And the Earth with its starkness
All these I place by God's almighty help and grace
Between myself and the powers of darkness

It is very similar to a portion of James Clarence Mangan's poem "St. Patrick’s Hymn before Tarah," a poetic rendition of Saint Patrick's Breastplate.

The rune within L'Engle's book has one significant difference from St. Patrick's Hymn. "At Tara" is replaced with "With Ananda"; the original refers to the Hill of Tara. However, in L'Engle's version, the words are different, and this has relevance to the overall context of the plot, as Ananda is both the name of the Murry family dog and the Sanskrit word for "bliss", a kind of internally generated divine condition, which is neither a deity nor a physical location.

== Sources ==
The background story of Madoc and his brother Gwydyr derive from a legend in which Madoc arrived in North America centuries before Leif Ericson and settled with the people there, eventually giving rise to a Welsh-speaking native tribe with some Caucasian features. Although the legend is generally centered on Georgia, along the Ohio River and elsewhere, L'Engle places Madoc and his genetic line in Connecticut, and places his descendants among a historical Welsh colony in Patagonia.

The verse given as Patrick's Rune is L'Engle's adaptation of an authentic medieval prayer, "Saint Patrick's Breastplate", which in turn is a variation on the Lorica of Saint Patrick. L'Engle's rune invokes the same natural phenomena (sun, moon, lightning, rocks, etc.) as the fourth verse of the hymn "Saint Patrick's Breastplate", attributed to St. Patrick, translated by Cecil Frances Alexander, according to the hymnal used by the Episcopal Church, of which L'Engle was a member.

=== The Horn of Joy ===
Matthew Maddox's second novel, The Horn of Joy (1868), serves as a MacGuffin in A Swiftly Tilting Planet. Charles Wallace spends a significant portion of the book trying to remember or discover what Maddox wrote in it, or to reach Maddox himself. Readers sometimes wonder whether The Horn of Joy ever existed; but it is a fictional book, created by L'Engle. Polly O'Keefe finds a copy of The Horn of Joy in her room (formerly Charles Wallace's room) when she visits her maternal grandparents in An Acceptable Time. Maddox's equally fictional first novel, Once More United, is said to have been published in 1865.

=== Vespugia ===
Vespugia is the same fictional country that L'Engle's character Vicky Austin later visits in Troubling a Star. L'Engle explains in Walking on Water that Vespugia is "set in the middle of what used to be called Patagonia, a sizeable area along what are now the boundaries of Chile and Argentina". L'Engle's husband, Hugh Franklin, is credited with having named Vespugia.

=== Series ===
This is the third book of the Time Quintet, preceded by, in publication order, A Wrinkle in Time (1962) and A Wind in the Door (1973). However, this was not the chronological order. Though Many Waters was written and published later than A Swiftly Tilting Planet, it takes place earlier with respect to the characters. The last book in the Quintet, An Acceptable Time, takes place a generation after A Swiftly Tilting Planet, and is part of the Polly O'Keefe series of books. The larger "Murry-O'Keefe" series (the Time Quintet plus the books of Poly/Polly O'Keefe) contains three novels between A Swiftly Tilting Planet and An Acceptable Time in terms of character chronology. These are The Arm of the Starfish, Dragons in the Waters, and A House Like a Lotus.

== Audio adaptation ==
The book was adapted to audio book in 2002, narrated by the author, and again in January 2012, narrated by actress Jennifer Ehle.

== Reception ==
At the time of the book's publication, Kirkus Reviews said, "L'Engle's irksomely superior Murry family reassembles here for Thanksgiving dinner... The idea, according to the unicorn, is for Charles to influence a Might-Have-Been which determines whether Branzillo is descended from the good or the bad line, and thus (?!) whether he will or will not start a nuclear war—a shaky if not asinine premise on which to build an earth-tilting adventure." In a 2012 essay for Tor.com, American author and critic Mari Ness wrote, "A Swiftly Tilting Planet is simultaneously one of L'Engle's most beautiful and poetic novels, filled with joy and despair, and also one of her most frustrating, a book that both celebrates her earlier books while completely contradicting some of their most important and fiercely argued ethical points. I find myself dazzled and irritated."

== Awards and honors ==
In its first paperback edition, A Swiftly Tilting Planet won a National Book Award in category Children's Books (paperback). (Note: From 1980 to 1983 in National Book Award history there were dual awards for hardcover and paperback books in many categories. Almost all of the paperback award-winners were reprints.)
