= Disney's A Wrinkle in Time =

A Wrinkle in Time is the name of two films produced by The Walt Disney Company based on the 1962 novel of the same name:

- A Wrinkle in Time (2003 film)
- A Wrinkle in Time (2010 film)
