= The Arm of the Starfish =

1965 novel by Madeleine L'Engle

- The Arm of the Starfish first edition
- Author: Madeleine L'Engle
- Cover artist: Ellen Raskin (hardback)
- Language: English
- Series: O'Keefe family
- Genre: Young adult Science fiction
- Publisher: Farrar, Straus & Giroux
- Publication date: January 1, 1965
- Publication place: United States
- Media type: Print (hardback)
- Pages: 243 pp
- ISBN: 0-374-30027-5
- OCLC: 20191102
- Dewey Decimal: [E] 20
- LC Class: PZ7.L5385 Ac 1989
- Preceded by: A Wrinkle in Time
- Followed by: Dragons in the Waters

The Arm of the Starfish is a young adult novel by American author Madeleine L'Engle, first published in 1965. It is the first novel featuring Poly O'Keefe and the O'Keefe family, a generation after the events of A Wrinkle in Time (1962). The plot concerning advanced regeneration research puts this novel in the science fiction genre, but it could also be described as a mystery thriller.

== Plot summary ==
The plot centers on a young marine biology student named Adam Eddington, who travels to the remote island Gaea off the coast of Portugal for a summer job working for a famous scientist, Dr. O'Keefe. Even before he leaves JFK airport, Adam is approached by Carolyn ("Kali") Cutter, the beautiful, well-traveled daughter of a rich American industrialist living in Europe. She warns Adam against yet another passenger, Canon Tallis. Tallis is accompanying Calvin O'Keefe's eldest daughter, 12-year-old Polly O'Keefe, to Geneva, but bad weather and mysterious dangers derail those plans.

Instead, Adam finds himself shepherding Polly on a short flight from Madrid to Lisbon. When Polly uses the restroom during the flight, she seems to disappear from the airplane completely, and the flight crew denies she was ever on board. Kali's father, Typhon Cutter, later enables Adam to rescue Polly from her kidnappers, deepening Adam's confusion about whom to trust. As the plot unfolds, it becomes clear that at least two different factions have equally strong but differently motivated interests in Dr. O'Keefe's research on organ regeneration. Adam faces a number of ethical dilemmas as he is forced to choose between these factions.

Eventually Adam realizes that the O'Keefes are the ones who care about "the fall of the sparrow," as their friend Joshua Archer puts it, a Biblical allusion to caring about others, even the seemingly weak and unimportant. Adam wants nothing further to do with Kali and her ruthless father, but the O'Keefes ask him to make a date with Kali anyway, so that Adam can act as a double agent, passing along fake research papers to the Cutters and smuggling the real ones out to trusted people in Lisbon. Adam reluctantly agrees.

This plan is complicated, however, by Kali's unexpected claim that she has learned of her father's perfidy, and wants Adam to protect her and keep her confidences. Adam's attempt to do so makes it nearly impossible to pass on the real papers, hampered as he is by Kali's presence and spies from both sides. Eventually Joshua comes to Adam's rescue, but is shot dead; and Adam learns that Kali was acting on her father's behalf all along. The Cutters are arrested but have enough money to pay for their freedom.

Later, Adam goes back to the Cutters' hotel to retrieve his passport from Kali. Playfully, she makes him chase her into the ocean, where she is attacked by a shark. Adam uses a special knife Polly gave him to fight off the shark and get Kali to shore. O'Keefe uses his experimental knowledge about limb regeneration to help Kali.

== Major characters ==
=== Adam Eddington ===
Intelligent, principled and a bit naive, 16-year-old Adam Eddington is a biology major who has been interning at Woods Hole, Massachusetts in the summers, until "Old Doc" Didymus sends him to work with Calvin O'Keefe instead. The Arm of the Starfish is Adam's first appearance in L'Engle's novels, and his only appearance in the O'Keefe series. He later appears in the Austin family novels A Ring of Endless Light and Troubling a Star.

=== Polyhymnia ("Poly") O'Keefe ===
12-year-old Poly is red-haired, and describes herself as having measurements of "twenty, twenty, twenty." Intelligent, inquisitive and loving, Poly speaks English, Spanish, German, Portuguese, Russian, and Gaean. The Arm of the Starfish is Poly's first appearance, as such, but Meg Murry O'Keefe was pregnant with her at the time of A Swiftly Tilting Planet. Her unusual first name was bestowed on her by Canon Tallis, after which the O'Keefes did not allow him to name their other children. In later books, Poly begins to spell her name Polly to avoid awkward explanations about being named after Polyhymnia, the Greek muse of sacred music, and to keep people from pronouncing it with a long o.

=== Charles O'Keefe ===
Charles O'Keefe is Poly's eldest younger brother, the closest to her in both age and companionship. Quiet, thoughtful and empathic, Charles shows signs of having extraordinary mental abilities, much like Charles Wallace Murry, the youngest maternal uncle for whom he is named.

=== Canon John "Tom" Tallis ===
Canon Tallis is a bald clergyman with no eyebrows, said to have lost his hair due to withstanding torture in the Korean War. Brusque and incisive, and not at all pious by L'Engle's definition, he defies the conventional image of a priest, and seems more than a little sinister to Adam at first. An Episcopal Canon, he is surprisingly adept (but not perfect) at navigating the dangerous waters of international intrigue. Canon Tallis reappears in the Austin family novel The Young Unicorns, where he is attached to the Cathedral of St. John the Divine in New York City, the same cathedral where Madeleine L'Engle was writer in residence for many years. He also appears in the second O'Keefe family novel, Dragons in the Waters. Tallis is nicknamed "Tom" or "Father Tom" because of the historical composer Thomas Tallis, who wrote the Tallis Canon.

=== Dr. Calvin O'Keefe ===
Calvin O'Keefe is a marine biologist, husband of Meg, and the father of seven children, the eldest of whom is Poly. Calvin first appeared in A Wrinkle in Time, as a 14-year-old high school junior, a popular and athletic but neglected adolescent from a family with eleven children. In this novel, his first name, Calvin, is never mentioned. As an adult, Calvin is a loving and attentive father. He was also an ambassador.

=== Margaret "Meg" Murry O'Keefe ===
Meg O'Keefe is the former teenage Meg Murry, who rescued her long-lost father from the dark planet Camazotz in A Wrinkle in Time. As of The Arm of the Starfish, she is a scientist and mathematician (albeit without a doctorate) who assists her girlhood friend and husband Calvin with his work, while also helping to raise her large family. In contrast to her awkward adolescence, she is described as "a tall, strikingly beautiful woman" as an adult.

== Nomenclature ==
Many of the characters in The Arm of the Starfish are named after Biblical or religious figures. The surname of the duplicitous Dr. Eliphaz Ball is initially misunderstood by Adam as Baal, a name given to a number of deities considered "false gods" by the Hebrews in ancient times. The name "Eliphaz" recalls the name of one of the comforters of Job; the Biblical Eliphaz believed that the righteous and just did not suffer, but that secret sins might be punished by God—a belief stated at the end of the Book of Job to be wrong. Canon Tallis is named after English liturgical composer Thomas Tallis, and of course the name Adam is from Genesis.

The concierge at the Ritz Hotel is called Arcangelo. Doc Didymus shares a name with the Apostle Thomas as well as the ecclesiastical writer Didymus the Blind. There is even a special dolphin named after a famed 4th-century Cappadocian ascetic, Macrina, who apparently has two brothers, Gregory (i.e. Saint Gregory of Nyssa) and Basil (i.e. Basil the Great of Caesarea). (The name Basil is later reused for another dolphin of Adam's acquaintance in A Ring of Endless Light.) Macrina's mended fin evokes the historical Macrina's scar, which her brother Gregory writes about in his Life of Macrina.

Classical names used in the book include Polyhymnia, the fictional Portuguese island of Gaea, named for a Greek goddess associated with the Earth, and Typhon, the deadliest monster in Greek mythology and the legendary "Father of Monsters".

Finally, the names of Kali Cutter and Joshua Archer are significant. Kali is the name of the Hindu goddess of change, power and destruction, while the girl's surname indicates that she and her father have the power to cut (i.e., wound) others, both figuratively and literally. Joshua, by contrast, bears the Hebrew name of two Biblical figures: Joshua, a commander who fought at God's command, and Jesus.

== Reception ==
At the time of the book's publication, Kirkus Reviews said, "As the conflict becomes more pronounced, the story gets weaker. The personal probe is valid although many may disagree with the answers, and it accompanies some solidly detailed, excitingly sustained adventure." Robert Hood wrote in The New York Times, "Tense, tricky, well-plotted, The Arm of the Starfish has all the stuff of which adult spy novels are made. From the moment you meet the 16-year-old hero, until the conclusion of his exotic adventures, the story moves like a missile to target." In a 2012 essay for Tor.com, American author and critic Mari Ness commented, "As a standalone book, it almost works. Unfortunately, although it can be read alone, The Arm of the Starfish is not quite a standalone book, as it features two of the characters from A Wrinkle in Time... This book gives no hint that two of its major adult characters traveled through time and space."

== Series notes ==
The Arm of the Starfish is the first of four novels about Poly (later called Polly) and the O'Keefe family. The other three are Dragons in the Waters (1976), A House Like a Lotus (1984) and An Acceptable Time (1989). The Arm of the Starfish takes place about twelve to thirteen years after the events of A Swiftly Tilting Planet, the last of the Time Quartet of books about the Murry family. The Murry-O'Keefe books are said to take place in Kairos time, as opposed to Chronos or ordinary time. As such they cannot easily be pinned down as taking place in a particular year or even a particular decade. This is partly a problem of time continuity, arising from the fact that the books were written over a period of several decades. However, L'Engle's use of the term Kairos (which she describes inside the front cover of Many Waters as "real time, pure numbers with no measurement") suggests a religious connotation as well. The second generation O'Keefe books were written concurrently with the Time Quartet (eventually Time Quintet), with The Arm of the Starfish appearing just three years after A Wrinkle in Time. The final book in the O'Keefe series, An Acceptable Time, is also the final book of the Time Quintet.

The Murry-O'Keefe books have further connections with other L'Engle titles. The Austin family books have three major crossover characters in common with the O'Keefe books, two of whom are introduced in The Arm of the Starfish. Canon Tallis meets the Austins in The Young Unicorns, which takes place a few months after Starfish. Adam Eddington meets Vicky Austin the following summer in A Ring of Endless Light, and Meg and Charles Wallace are mentioned in The Moon by Night. The Austin family series is associated with Chronos instead of Kairos.
