= Hugh Franklin =

Hugh Franklin may refer to:

- Hugh Franklin (actor) (1916–1986), American actor
- Hugh Franklin (suffragist) (1889–1962), British political activist
