= Ilsa (novel) =

1946 novel by Madeleine L'Engle

- First and only U.S. edition of Ilsa
- Author: Madeleine L'Engle
- Cover artist: Leslie
- Language: English
- Genre: Novel
- Publisher: Vanguard Press
- Publication date: 1946
- Publication place: United States
- Media type: Print (Hardback)
- ISBN: 9-781504-049443
- Preceded by: The Small Rain
- Followed by: And Both Were Young

Ilsa is a 1946 novel by Madeleine L'Engle. Its significance lies largely in its rarity, the book having been out of print for nearly sixty years. It was the author's second novel, published a year after The Small Rain.

== Bibliographical data ==
Ilsa (New York: The Vanguard Press, 1946, 416 pp.) was published simultaneously in Canada by Copp Clark, Ltd. No catalog number of any sort is given. The dust jacket portrait of Ilsa is signed by "leslie." The original cover price was $2.75.

== Plot summary ==
The title character, Ilsa Brandes, initially lives with her naturalist father, Dr. John Brandes, in a house on a beach, outside a fictional town in the American Deep South. 13-year-old Ilsa is a vibrant, outgoing, seemingly carefree person. She immediately captivates the book's narrator, Henry Randolph Porcher, who is ten years old as the book opens. Henry's mother hates Ilsa and Dr. Brandes, even to the point of refusing their help when her home is on fire. After the fire, Henry and his family go to stay with relatives in Charleston, where Henry gets his first hints about the family scandals that explain his mother's attitude. The circumstances of Ilsa's birth are the subject of controversy, both locally and in Charleston.

After the death of her father, Ilsa goes to live with Henry's cousin, Anna Silverton. Henry's mother dies soon after this. Henry finally sees Ilsa again, and renews his friendship with her. Unfortunately for Henry, Ilsa later marries Monty Woolf, another cousin of Henry's. Despite his continuing love for Ilsa, Henry does little to further a romance with her, even after Monty's death. Nevertheless, he keeps returning to her side over the years. Ilsa and Henry experience numerous personal setbacks - including Ilsa's blindness and Henry's failure as a musician - and few if any triumphs.

== Crossover characters ==
The character Virginia Bowen Porcher in L'Engle's 1984 novel A House Like a Lotus is said to be married to Henri Porcher, a French, mentally ill person whose American grandfather "late in life married a distant cousin in Paris." The Renier family, prominent in The Other Side of the Sun (1971), Dragons in the Waters (1976, ISBN 0-374-31868-9), and A House Like a Lotus (1984, ISBN 0-374-33385-8), also appears in Ilsa.

== History and collectibility ==
Unlike virtually all of L'Engle's other novels, Ilsa was never republished or reprinted for years. Although no official explanation has ever been given, the book's continued unavailability appeared to stem from the author's own reported dissatisfaction with the book. As an early work, Ilsa lacks the positive themes of family, love, faith, and overcoming adversity that are so prevalent in L'Engle's later novels. The plot may also be considered somewhat unsatisfactory, with more happening to the characters than being done by them. Although this was probably a deliberate choice by the author at the time, the result is an unconventional, somewhat disturbing book.

Nevertheless, this is one of the most sought-after titles for serious collectors of Madeleine L'Engle's work. An April, 2006 survey of copies offered online showed asking prices ranging from $249.50 to $900.00, the latter for a signed copy.

After many years out-of-print, Ilsa was republished on May 15, 2018.
