= A Wrinkle in Time =

1962 science fantasy novel by Madeleine L'Engle

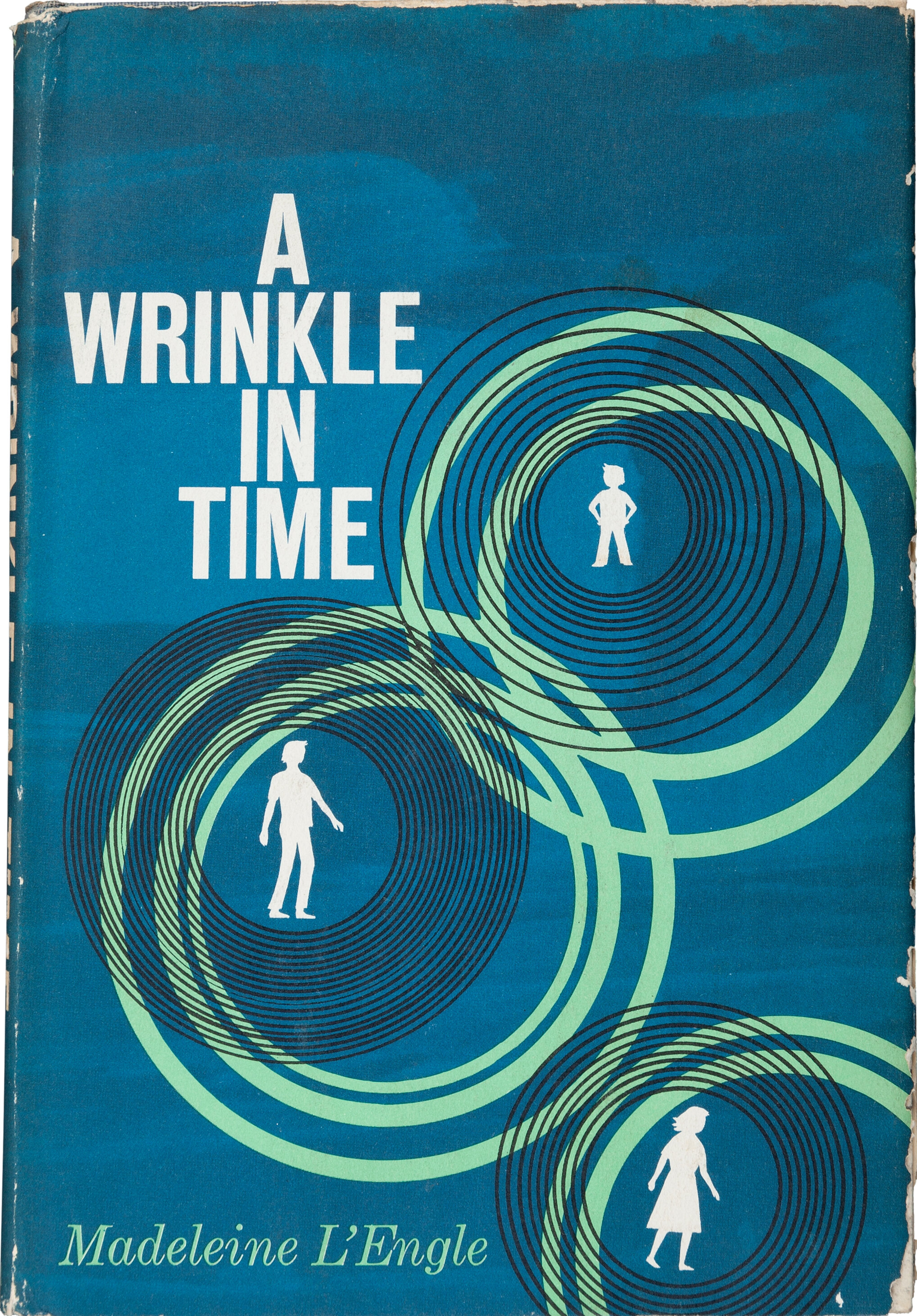
- First-edition dust jacket
- Author: Madeleine L'Engle
- Illustrator: Ellen Raskin (1960s editions)
- Language: English
- Series: 8
- Genre: Young adult, science fantasy
- Publisher: Ariel Books
- Publication date: January 1, 1962
- Publication place: United States
- OCLC: 22421788
- LC Class: PZ7.L5385 Wr 1962
- Followed by: A Wind in the Door

A Wrinkle in Time is a young adult science fantasy novel written by American author Madeleine L'Engle. First published in 1962, the book won the Newbery Medal, the Sequoyah Book Award and the Lewis Carroll Shelf Award, and was runner-up for the Hans Christian Andersen Award. (Note: The biennial, international Hans Christian Andersen Award for children's writing was inaugurated in 1956, recognizing a single book published during the preceding two years. After the first three editions – that is, from 1962 – it has recognized a living author for a lasting contribution, considering their complete works. Nevertheless, a "Runner-Up List" with single book titles was published from 1960 to 1964.) The main characters – Meg Murry, Charles Wallace Murry, and Calvin O'Keefe – embark on a journey through space and time, from galaxy to galaxy, as they endeavor to rescue the Murrys' father and fight The Black Thing that has intruded into several worlds.

The novel offers a glimpse into the war between light and darkness, and good and evil, as the young characters mature into adolescents on their journey, and wrestle with questions of spirituality and purpose, as the characters are often thrown into conflicts of love, divinity, and goodness. It is the first book in L'Engle's Time Quintet, which follows the Murry and O'Keefe families.

L'Engle modeled the Murry family on her own. B. E. Cullinan noted that L'Engle created characters who "share common joy with a mixed fantasy and science fiction setting". The novel's scientific and religious undertones are therefore highly reflective of the life of L'Engle.

The book has sold over ten million copies and inspired a 2003 television film directed by John Kent Harrison as well as a 2018 theatrical film directed by Ava DuVernay, both produced by The Walt Disney Company.

== Background ==
Raised on the Upper East Side of Manhattan, author Madeleine L'Engle began writing at a young age. After graduating from boarding school in Switzerland, she attended Smith College, where she earned a degree in English. In addition to writing, L'Engle also gained experience as an actor and playwright. At age 40, she nearly abandoned her career as a novelist, but continued to write after her publication of Meet the Austins.

L'Engle wrote A Wrinkle in Time between 1959 and 1960. In her memoir, L'Engle explains that the book was conceived "during a time of transition". After years of living in rural Goshen, Connecticut where they ran a general store, L'Engle's family, the Franklins, moved back to New York City, first taking a 10-week camping trip across the country. L'Engle writes that "we drove through a world of deserts and buttes and leafless mountains, wholly new and alien to me. And suddenly into my mind came the names, Mrs. Whatsit, Mrs. Who, and Mrs. Which." This was in the spring of 1959. When asked for more information in an interview with Horn Book magazine in 1983, L'Engle responded, "I cannot possibly tell you how I came to write it. It was simply a book I had to write. I had no choice. It was only after it was written that I realized what some of it meant."

L'Engle has also described the novel as her "psalm of praise to God."

Additionally, L'Engle drew upon her interest in science. The novel includes references to Einstein's theory of relativity and Planck's quantum theory.

A Wrinkle in Time is the first novel in the Time Quintet, a series of five young-adult novels by L'Engle. Later books are A Wind in the Door, A Swiftly Tilting Planet, Many Waters, and An Acceptable Time. The series follows the adventures of Meg Murry, her youngest brother Charles Wallace Murry, their twin siblings Sandy and Dennys Murry, and their friend Calvin O'Keefe. Throughout the series, family members band together to travel through time as they attempt to save the world from the grasps of evil.

== Publication history ==
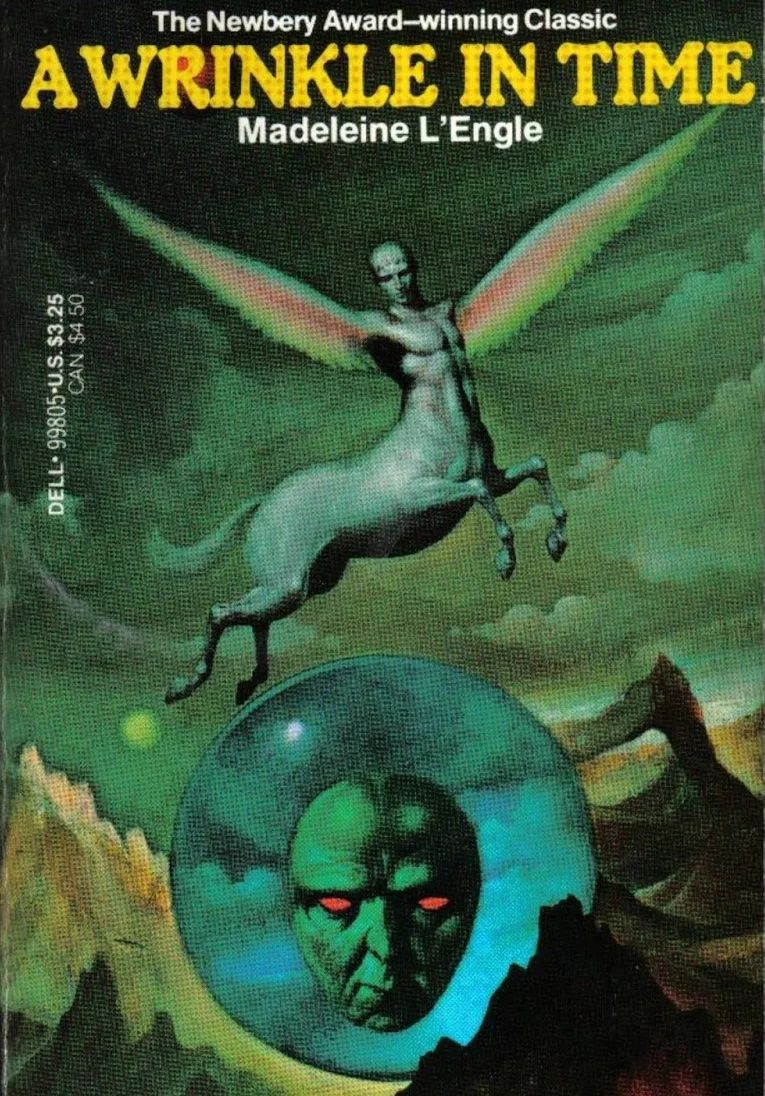
Book cover art (1976) by Richard Bober

Upon completion in 1960, the novel was rejected by at least 26 publishers, because it was, in L'Engle's words, "too different", and "because it deals overtly with the problem of evil, and it was really difficult for children, and was it a children's or an adults' book, anyhow?"

In "A Special Message from Madeleine L'Engle", L'Engle offers another possible reason for the rejections: "A Wrinkle in Time had a female protagonist in a science fiction book", which at the time was rare.

After trying "forty-odd" publishers (L'Engle later said "twenty-six rejections"), L'Engle's agent returned the manuscript to her. Then at Christmas, L'Engle threw a tea party for her mother. One of the guests happened to know J. C. Farrar of Farrar, Straus and Giroux, and he insisted that L'Engle should meet with him. Although the publisher did not, at the time, publish a line of children's books, Farrar met L'Engle, liked the novel, and ultimately published it under the Ariel imprint.

Hardcover art by Leo and Diane Dillon, showing the "Mrs Ws".

In 1963, the book won the Newbery Medal, an annual award given by the Association for Library Service to Children, a division of the American Library Association, to the author of the most distinguished contribution to American children's literature. The book has been continuously in print since its first publication. The hardback edition is still published by Farrar, Straus & Giroux. The original blue dust jacket by Ellen Raskin was replaced with new art by Leo and Diane Dillon, with the publication of A Swiftly Tilting Planet in 1978. The book has also been published in a 25th anniversary collectors' edition (limited to 500 signed and numbered copies), at least two book club editions (one hardback, one Scholastic Book Services paperback), as a trade paperback under the Dell Yearling imprint, and as a mass market paperback under the Dell Laurel-Leaf imprint. The cover art on the paperback editions has changed several times since its first publication.

The book was reissued by Square Fish in trade and mass market paperback formats in May 2007, along with the rest of the Time Quintet. This new edition includes a previously unpublished interview with L'Engle as well as a transcription of her Newbery Medal acceptance speech.

== Plot summary ==
One night, 13-year-old Meg Murry meets an eccentric new neighbor, Mrs Whatsit, who refers to something called a tesseract, which Meg later discovers is a scientific concept her father, Dr. Alex Murry, was working on before his mysterious disappearance years earlier. The following day, Meg, her child genius little brother Charles Wallace, and fellow schoolmate Calvin visit Mrs Whatsit's home, where the equally strange Mrs Who and the voice of the unseen Mrs Which promise to help Meg and Charles Wallace find and rescue their father. Mrs Whatsit, Mrs Who, and Mrs Which turn out to be supernatural beings who teleport the children through the universe by using a tesseract, a fifth-dimensional phenomenon explained as folding the fabric of space-time; this form of travel is called tessering.

Their first stop is the planet Uriel, a world inhabited by centaur-like beings who live in a state of light and love, fighting against the approaching darkness. There, the Ws demonstrate to the children how the universe is under attack from an evil being that appears particularly clearly on Uriel as an overwhelming dark cloud, called the Black Thing. The Ws then take the children to Orion's Belt to visit the Happy Medium, a far-seeing person with a crystal ball, who shows them that Earth is partially covered by the darkness, although great religious figures, philosophers, scientists, and artists have been fighting against it. Mrs Whatsit is revealed to be a former star, who exploded in an act of self-sacrifice to fight the darkness.

The three Ws tesser the children to the edge of the inhabited part of a dark planet, Camazotz, which has succumbed to the Black Thing, and reveal that Dr. Murry is somewhere on the planet. The three Ws cannot join the children in their search, so they give the children gifts before they part ways: Mrs Whatsit strengthens Calvin's communication skills, gives Meg her faults, and gives Charles Wallace the resilience of childhood; Mrs Who gifts Meg her glasses to use at an appointed time and reminds Charles Wallace that he does not know everything; Mrs Which orders the children to stay together and be strong. The Ws then depart.

As the children approach the town they spotted when they first arrived on Camazotz, they notice every house in the neighborhood is a copy and everyone is acting exactly the same as each other. The children stop a boy to question him; he tells them everything is controlled by CENTRAL Central Intelligence and they should head there for information. When they reach the Central Intelligence Center, they are confronted by the Man with Red Eyes, the mouthpiece of IT, a disembodied brain with powerful telepathic abilities that controls the planet. Attempting to discover his father's location, Charles Wallace allows himself to be hypnotized by the Man with Red Eyes. While he is hypnotized, Charles Wallace explains that Camazotz is the result of all uniqueness being removed from the denizens of the planet and leads the children further into the building. They eventually arrive where Dr. Murry is being held captive, but Meg and Calvin are unable to access his prison or get his attention.

Using Mrs Who's glasses, Meg breaks into the prison and reaches her father. Dr. Murry attempts to break Charles Wallace's hypnosis, but he is unable to do so. Charles Wallace leads the trio to a dome which houses IT, which attempts to hypnotize Meg, Calvin, and Dr. Murry. Feeling themselves succumbing, Dr. Murry tessers Meg, Calvin, and himself to the adjacent planet Ixchel before IT can hypnotize them. Charles Wallace is left behind, still under the influence of IT, and Meg is paralyzed from contact with the Black Thing after they tesser through it.

They find the inhabitants of Ixchel are beast-like, with featureless faces, tentacles, and four arms. Despite their frightening appearance, one cures Meg's paralysis, prompting Meg to nickname it "Aunt Beast". The trio of Mrs Whatsit, Mrs Who, and Mrs Which arrive on Ixchel and assign the rescue of Charles Wallace to Meg alone. Arriving at the building where IT resides, she finds Charles Wallace still under IT's control. Inspired by hints from the Ws, Meg focuses all her love on her brother and is able to free him from IT, at which point Mrs Which tessers the two of them off Camazotz.

The group tessers back to Earth to the forest near the Murry home, and back to the moment in time just after the Ws and the children originally left Earth; the Ws then vanish. (Note: The effect of Meg's rescue of Charles Wallace on IT and the fate of the people of Camazotz are not shown or described, though Meg hopefully wonders if IT would shrivel up and die if she could love it. After they vanish at the end of the book, the three Mrs. Ws never re‑appear in L'Engle's stories.)

== Analysis ==
=== Religion ===
The novel is highly spiritualized, with notable influences of divine intervention and prominent undertones of religious messages. According to James Beasley Simpson, the overwhelming love and desire for light within the novel is directly representative of a Christian love for God and Jesus Christ. Furthermore, the children encounter spiritual intervention, signaling God's presence in the ordinary, as well as the extendibility of God's power and love. Madeleine L'Engle's fantasy works are in part highly expressive of her Christian viewpoint in a manner somewhat similar to that of Christian fantasy writer C.S. Lewis. (Note: L'Engle was herself the official writer-in-residence at New York City's Episcopal Cathedral of St. John the Divine, which is known for its prominent position in the liberal wing of the Episcopal Church.) L'Engle's liberal Christianity has been the target of criticism from conservative Christians, especially with respect to certain elements of A Wrinkle in Time.

L'Engle utilizes numerous religious references and allusions in the naming of locations within the novel. Camazotz is the name of a Mayan bat god, one of L'Engle's many mythological allusions in her nomenclature. (Note: Stott, Jon (Fall 1977). "Midsummer night's dreams: Fantasy and self-realization in children's fiction". The Lion and the Unicorn. 1 (2): 25–39. doi:10.1353/uni.0.0401. S2CID 145776252.; cited by Hettinga) The name Ixchel refers to a Mayan jaguar goddess of medicine. Uriel is a planet with extremely tall mountains, an allusion to the Archangel Uriel. It is inhabited by creatures that resemble winged centaurs. It is "the third planet of the star Malak (meaning 'angel' in Hebrew) in the spiral galaxy Messier 101", which would place it at roughly 21 million light-years from Earth. The site of Mrs Whatsit's temporary transformation into one of these winged creatures, it is the place where "the guardian angels show the questers a vision of the universe that is obscured on earth." The three women are described as ancient beings who act as guardian angels.

The theme of picturing the fight of good against evil as a battle of light and darkness is a recurring one. Its manner is reminiscent of the prologue to the Gospel of John, which is quoted within the book. When the Ws reveal their secret roles in the cosmic fight against darkness, they ask the children to name some figures on Earth, a partially dark planet, who fight the darkness. They name Jesus and, later in the discussion, the Buddha is named as well.

Nevertheless, religious journalist Sarah Pulliam Bailey doubts whether the novel contains religious undertones. Bailey explains that many readers somehow believe the novel promotes witchcraft, as opposed to alluding to Christian spirituality. Bailey states that conservative Christians take offense, due to the novel's potential relativistic qualities, suggesting the various interpretations of religious allusions signals anti-Christian sentiments. However, in her personal journal referencing A Wrinkle in Time, L'Engle confirms the religious content within the novel: "If I've ever written a book that says what I feel about God and the universe, this is it."

=== Conformity ===
Themes of conformity and yielding to the status quo are prominent in the novel:

IT is a powerful dominant group that manipulates the planet of Camazotz into conformity. Even Charles Wallace falls prey and is hence persuaded to conform. It is thanks to Meg that she and her father and brother are able to break from conformity. (Note: ... the importance of both individual initiative and family interaction is a thematic thread. L'Engle made both the Murry adults highly talented, both intellectually and scientifically. This was atypical of fiction published in the 1950s, when the book was written. Female characters rarely were featured as intellectuals or scientists. L'Engle has been praised for this departure as well as for her creation of strong female characters. Critics even suggested that in making Meg the protagonist in A Wrinkle in Time, L'Engle opened the door for the many female protagonists who have appeared in more recent fantasy and science fiction. — J. Fulton (2002))

According to Charlotte Jones Voiklis, the author's granddaughter, the story was not a simple allegory of communism; in a three-page passage that was cut before publication, the process of domination and conformity is said to be an outcome of dictatorship under totalitarian regimes, and of an intemperate desire for security in democratic countries.

J. Fulton writes:

L'Engle's fiction for young readers is considered important partly because she was among the first to focus directly on the deep, delicate issues that young people must face, such as death, social conformity, and truth. L'Engle's work always is uplifting because she is able to look at the surface values of life from a perspective of wholeness, both joy and pain, transcending each to uncover the absolute nature of human experience that they share. (Note: Madeleine L'Engle's view of the universe was changed by the work of such well-known physicists as Albert Einstein and Max Planck. She expressed her new perspective in A Wrinkle in Time ... — J. Fulton (2002))

==== Conformity on Camazotz ====
Camazotz is a planet of extreme, enforced conformity, ruled by a disembodied brain called IT. Camazotz is similar to Earth, with familiar trees such as birches, pines, and maples, an ordinary hill on which the children arrive, and a town with smokestacks, which "might have been one of any number of familiar towns". The horror of the place arises from its ordinary appearance, endlessly duplicated. The houses are "all exactly alike, small square boxes painted gray", which, according to author Donald Hettinga, signals a comparison to "the burgeoning American suburbia", such as the post-war housing developments of Levittown, New York. The people who live in the houses are similarly described as "mother figures" who "all gave the appearance of being the same". The children in the houses all bounce their balls in unison, and those who do not appear to be tortured by IT.

W. Blackburn compared Camazotz to "an early sixties American image of life in a communist state", which Blackburn later dismissed. (Note: Blackburn, William (1985). "Madeleine L'Engle's A Wrinkle in Time: Seeking the original face". Touchstones: Reflections on the Best in Children's Literature. 1: 125. Cited by Hettinga)

=== Feminism ===
A Wrinkle in Time has also received praise for empowering young female readers. Critics have celebrated L'Engle's depiction of Meg Murry, a young, precocious heroine whose curiosity and intellect help save the world from evil. The New York Times has described this portrayal as "a departure from the typical 'girls' book' protagonist – as wonderful as many of those varied characters are".

In doing so, L'Engle has been credited for paving the way for other bright heroines, including Hermione Granger of the Harry Potter book series, as well as Katniss Everdeen of the Hunger Games trilogy. Regarding her choice to include a female protagonist, L'Engle has stated in her acceptance speech upon receiving the Margaret Edwards Award, "I'm a female. Why would I give all the best ideas to a male?"

== Reception ==
At the time of the book's publication, Kirkus Reviews said:

Readers who relish symbolic reference may find this trip through time and space an exhilarating experience; the rest will be forced to ponder the double entendres.

According to The Horn Book Magazine:

Here is a confusion of science, philosophy, satire, religion, literary allusions, and quotations that will no doubt have many critics. I found it fascinating ... It makes unusual demands on the imagination and consequently gives great rewards.

In a retrospective essay about the Newbery Medal-winning books from 1956 to 1965, librarian Carolyn Horovitz wrote:

There is no question but that the book is good entertainment and that the writer carries the story along with a great deal of verve; there is some question about the depth of its quality.

In a 2011 essay for Tor.com, American author and critic Mari Ness called A Wrinkle in Time

a book that refuses to talk down to its readers, believing them able to grasp the difficult concepts of mathematics, love and the battle between good and evil. And that's quite something.

A 2004 study found that A Wrinkle in Time was a common read-aloud book for sixth-graders in schools in San Diego County, California. Based on a 2007 online poll, the National Education Association listed the book as one of its "Teachers' top 100 books for children". It was one of the "Top 100 chapter books" of all time in a 2012 poll by School Library Journal.

In 2016, the novel saw a spike in sales after Chelsea Clinton mentioned it as influential in her childhood in a speech at the 2016 Democratic National Convention.

In late 2025, A Wrinkle in Time was referenced in the fifth season of the television series Stranger Things and is used in comparison for elements in the series. The inclusion in the series has been noted to have led to a renewed interest in the novel.

=== Attempted bans in U.S. schools ===
A Wrinkle in Time is on the American Library Association list of the 100 most frequently challenged books of 1990–2000 at number 23. The novel has been accused of being both anti-religious and anti-Christian for its inclusion of witches and crystal balls, and for containing "New Age" spiritual themes that do not reflect traditional Christian teachings.

According to USA Today, the novel was challenged in a school district in the state of Alabama due to the "book's listing the name of Jesus Christ together with the names of great artists, philosophers, scientists, and religious leaders when referring to those who defend Earth against evil." The novel was also challenged in 1984 by an elementary school in Polk City, Florida when parents claimed that the novel promoted witchcraft.

Regarding this controversy, L'Engle told The New York Times:

It seems people are willing to damn the book without reading it. Nonsense about witchcraft and fantasy. First I felt horror, then anger, and finally I said, 'Aw, the hell with it.' It's great publicity, really.

== Adaptations ==
=== Audio books ===
In 1972, Miller-Brody Productions recorded a dramatization of the book for Newbery Award Records. Narrated by William Griffis, the dramatization featured Cassandra Finklehoffe, Linda Phillips, Tom Brooks, Joan Shepard, Rita Lloyd, Corinne Orr, Bryna Raeburn, Linda McCourt, Earl Hammond, Lawson Zerbe, Malachy McCourt and Pierre Cache.

In 1994, Listening Library released an unabridged, four-cassette audio edition read by the author.

On January 10, 2012, Audible released a 50th anniversary edition recorded by Hope Davis.

=== Film adaptations ===
From left: David Dorfman as Charles Wallace Murry, Katie Stuart as Meg Murry, and Gregory Smith as Calvin O'Keefe on the planet Uriel in the 2003 television adaptation

In 2003, a television adaptation of the novel was made by a collaboration of Canadian production companies, to be distributed in the United States by The Walt Disney Company. The movie was directed by John Kent Harrison, with a teleplay by Susan Shilliday. It stars Katie Stuart as Meg Murry, Alfre Woodard as Mrs Whatsit, Alison Elliott as Mrs Who, and Kate Nelligan as Mrs Which. In an interview with MSNBC / Newsweek, when L'Engle was asked if the film "met her expectations", she said, "I have glimpsed it ... I expected it to be bad, and it is."

A theatrical feature film adaptation of the novel, by Walt Disney Pictures, was released in 2018. The film was directed by Ava DuVernay and written by Jennifer Lee and Jeff Stockwell. It stars Oprah Winfrey, Reese Witherspoon, Mindy Kaling, Chris Pine, Gugu Mbatha-Raw, Storm Reid, Michael Peña, and Zach Galifianakis.

=== Plays ===
An adaptation by James Sie premiered at the Lifeline Theatre in Chicago in 1990, and returned to the stage in 1998 and 2017.

John Glore adapted the novel as a play that premiered in 2010. It was written for six actors playing 12 parts. One actor plays Mrs Whatsit, the Man with Red Eyes, and Camazotz Man. Similarly, another performer plays the characters of Dr. Kate Murry, Mrs Who, Camazotz Woman, and Aunt Beast. The stage adaptation premiered in Costa Mesa, California, with productions in Bethesda, Maryland; Cincinnati; Philadelphia; Orlando; Portland, Oregon; and other cities.

An adaptation by Tracy Young premiered at the Oregon Shakespeare Festival in April 2014, with productions at colleges and theaters around the U.S.

A new musical adaptation with book by Lauren Yee and music and lyrics by Heather Christian made its world premiere at Arena Stage in June 2025, directed by Lee Sunday Evans. It starred Amber Gray as Mrs Whatsit, Vicki Lewis as Mrs Which, Stacey Sargeant as Mrs Who, and Taylor Iman Jones as Meg Murry.

=== Opera ===
In 1992, OperaDelaware (known for frequently adapting children's books) staged an opera based on A Wrinkle in Time written by Libby Larsen with a libretto by Walter Green. The review in Philly.com stated: "The composer does not place arias and set pieces, but conversational ensembles with spoken dialogue that made the young daughter's climactic but concise song about familial love all the more imposing."

=== Graphic novel ===
In 2010, Hope Larson announced that she was writing and illustrating the official graphic novel version of the book. A Wrinkle in Time: the Graphic Novel was published by Farrar, Straus & Giroux in October 2012. It won the 2013 Eisner Award for Best Publication for Teens.

=== References in television ===
The book appears as a subject of an episode of the first season of Ted Lasso. Ted gifts a copy of the book to Roy Kent with story being used as a metaphor for coaching a football team, specifically for Roy to embrace the burden of leadership. Initially, Roy views this as a joke, but the book serves as a pivotal character development tool, mirroring Roy's journey to becoming a mentor and a more "tractable" person. In the second season, the book is read by Sam Obisanya.

The novel is referenced extensively in the fifth and final season of Stranger Things, particularly through the character Holly Wheeler, who owns a copy. The book is used as a thematic metaphor for the Upside Down, with references to the dark planet Camazotz, the creature "IT", and the concept of "tesseracting" for the mindscape where Henry Creel / Vecna resides; Vecna also poses as Mr. Whatsit to lure Holly and other children into captivity.

== See also ==
- Tunnel Through Time
- Wormhole

== Notes ==
Awards
Preceded by The Bronze Bow	Newbery Medal recipient 1963	Succeeded by It's Like This, Cat
