= Tesseract (disambiguation) =

A tesseract is a four-dimensional analog of the cube.

Tesseract may also refer to:

== Literature ==
- The Tesseract (novel), by Alex Garland (1998)
- The tesseract, or wrinkle, an invented physical phenomenon facilitating travel through space and time in Madeleine L'Engle's 1962 science fantasy novel A Wrinkle in Time

== Film ==
- The Tesseract (film), a 2003 film based on the Alex Garland novel
- Tesseract (Marvel Cinematic Universe), a version of the Cosmic Cube

== Games ==
- Tesseract, a 3D game engine, fork of the Cube 2 Engine. This engine is often mistaken with the game it was made for, that is also named Tesseract.
- Beyond the Tesseract, a 1983 text based adventure game for the TRS-80

== Music ==
- Tesseract (band), a British progressive metal band

== Television ==
- "The Tesseract" (Marvel Studios: Legends), an episode of Marvel Studios: Legends

== Other uses ==
- Tesseract (software), an optical character recognition (OCR) engine
- Yamaha Tesseract, a concept 4-wheeled motorcycle
- Tesseract, an art installation at the California Institute of Technology
