= Many Waters =

1986 novel by Madeleine L'Engle

- First edition cover
- Author: Madeleine L'Engle
- Cover artist: Charles Mikolaycak
- Language: English
- Series: Time Quintet
- Genre: Young adult, Fantasy novel
- Publisher: Farrar, Straus & Giroux
- Publication date: September 1, 1986
- Publication place: United States
- Media type: Print (Hardback & Paperback)
- Pages: 351 pp
- ISBN: 0-374-34796-4
- OCLC: 13823586
- Dewey Decimal: [Fic] 19
- LC Class: PZ7.L5385 Man 1986
- Preceded by: A Swiftly Tilting Planet
- Followed by: An Acceptable Time

Many Waters is a 1986 novel by American author Madeleine L'Engle, part of the author's Time Quintet (also known as the Time Quartet). The title is taken from the Song of Solomon 8:7: "Many waters cannot quench love, neither can the floods drown it. If a man were to give all his wealth for love, it would be utterly scorned."

The principal characters of the story are Sandy and Dennys Murry, twin brothers who are somewhat out of place in the Murry family from A Wrinkle in Time. The action of the story follows that of A Wind in the Door but precedes the climactic, apocalyptic event in A Swiftly Tilting Planet.

== Plot summary ==
In the middle of a New England winter, identical twin brothers Sandy and Dennys accidentally disturb an experiment in their parents' laboratory and are teleported to a sandy desert. There, they are acquired by water-prospector 'Japheth' and guided to an oasis, but Dennys is separated from the others. Sandy remains with Japheth and his elderly grandfather Lamech; there, Sandy is cured of heatstroke by a variety of improbable beings, including seraphim.

Dennys reappears in another tent and is thrown into a refuse heap. He later comes under the care of a friendly family in the center of the oasis, headed by a gruff but kindly patriarch called Noah. It soon becomes apparent that the boys have been interpolated into the story of Noah's Ark, shortly before the Flood. Both Noah and Lamech receive mysterious instructions from God (known as El) concerning the building of the Ark. The twins come to understand that unicorns who can traverse space and time live in the oasis. Sinister supernatural beings known as the nephilim distrust the twins, and their human wives attempt to gather information about them. At several points, the wife of a nephil unsuccessfully attempts to seduce Sandy.

Separated for much of the book, the twins become more independent of each other and gain maturity over the course of a year in the desert. Both are in love with Noah's beautiful and virtuous daughter Yalith (and she with them), but neither twin declares his affection until the very end of the novel. Dennys convinces Noah to reconcile with his father, Lamech, and both twins eventually care for Lamech's gardens while he lies ill. After Lamech's death, Sandy is kidnapped, but is eventually found by Japheth. Suspense arises when it becomes clear that there is no place on the Ark reserved for Sandy, Dennys, or Yalith. After both twins assist in the construction of the Ark, Yalith is taken by the seraphim to the presence of El. Sandy and Dennys are then returned to their own time and place by unicorns summoned by the seraphim.

== Major themes ==
The story largely concerns the teenaged twins' emotional coming of age, but, like the other three novels about the Murry family, includes elements of fantasy and Christian theology such as the seraphim, a heavenly race of angels, and the nephilim, a race of giants that were the result of the mating of mortal women and angels, are the main antagonists of the story (see Genesis 6:1-4). Author Donald R. Hettinga notes that the world of Noah's oasis is especially difficult for "the empirically minded twins" to accept because in L'Engle's theology of "a gradual Fall", it is still populated by manticores and unicorns, "everyone can still see angels," and some people "can still converse intimately with God." Similarities to the fantasy-science fiction works of C. S. Lewis, always present in L'Engle's oeuvre, are particularly notable here. The twins' difficulty in believing in things that exist outside their empiricist world is a trait they must overcome in the story, because it is only by believing in a "virtual unicorn" that they can obtain transportation back to their everyday world.

== Reception ==
Kirkus Reviews called the book "the kind of intricate tale with complex characters and relationships that L'Engle's readers have come to expect... A carefully wrought fable, entwining disparate elements from unicorns to particle physics, this will be enjoyed for its suspense and humor as well as its other levels of meaning." Writing for The New York Times, Newbery Medal-winning author Susan Cooper wrote, "Analogies between the Flood and the possibility of nuclear destruction are suggested from time to time, but no didactic conclusion is forced out of them... Miss L'Engle is above all a skillful storyteller, and every admirer of 'A Wrinkle in Time' will have fun with 'Many Waters.'"
