= An Acceptable Time =

1989 book by Madeleine L'Engle

- An Acceptable Time first edition
- Author: Madeleine L'Engle
- Cover artist: (hardback)
- Language: English
- Series: Time Quintet, Polly O'Keefe
- Genre: Young adult, Science fiction novel
- Publisher: Farrar, Straus & Giroux
- Publication date: October 1, 1989
- Publication place: United States
- Media type: Print (hardback & paperback)
- Pages: 343 pp
- ISBN: 0-374-30027-5
- OCLC: 20191102
- Dewey Decimal: [E] 20
- LC Class: PZ7.L5385 Ac 1989
- Preceded by: Many Waters

An Acceptable Time is a 1989 young adult science fiction novel by American author Madeleine L'Engle, the last of her books to feature Polyhymnia O'Keefe, better known as Poly (The Arm of the Starfish, Dragons in the Waters) or Polly (A House Like a Lotus, An Acceptable Time). Marketed as part of the author's Time Quintet, An Acceptable Time connects Polly's adventures with those of her parents, Meg Murry and Calvin O'Keefe, which take place a generation earlier. The book's title is taken from Psalm 69:13, "But as for me, my prayer is to You, O Lord, at an acceptable time."

== Plot summary ==
Happy to be away from her large family for a while, Polly O'Keefe is spending the autumn with her maternal grandparents, Dr. Kate Murry and Dr. Alex Murry, getting a better education from them in science than she would have received at home. She is grieving the loss of her beloved friend and mentor, Maximiliana Sebastiane Horne. Soon, however, surprising things start to happen, including the unexpected arrival of Zachary Gray, a charming but troubled college student whom Polly met in Greece and dated in Cyprus the year before (in A House Like a Lotus).

Then, while walking near her grandparents' Connecticut home, Polly meets druids Karralys and Anaral and a warrior named Tav, all of whom lived in the area some three thousand years ago. She soon learns that she is not the first person from her time to meet the Murrys' Pre-Columbian neighbors. Bishop Nason Colubra, the brother of a family friend, Dr. Louise Colubra, has been investigating the hieroglyphs found on rocks in nearby, relics of Karralys' time. In doing so, he has also come into repeated contact with Anaral's tribe, the People of the Wind (a tribe that previously appeared in A Swiftly Tilting Planet). The retired bishop is initially reluctant to discuss this, having been met with his sister's skepticism in previous attempts. However, he feels responsible for exposing Polly to the potential dangers of a tesseract of intersecting periods of time.

The Murrys and the Colubras try to protect Polly from being drawn into the past, but although she tries to obey their restrictions on her movements, she continues to encounter Anaral and the others. Karralys and Tav formerly lived in ancient Britain, but have since crossed the ocean and made their home with the People of the Wind. On Samhain, Polly feels a compulsion to visit the Murrys' indoor swimming pool, the modern location of a site considered sacred by Karralys, Anaral, and their tribe. Polly is suddenly transported to the past, where she learns that Tav wants to offer Polly in blood sacrifice in order to avert a drought. Already the People Across the Lake are conducting raids due to the privations of drought, and Tav wants to protect his adopted people. Karralys sends Polly home.

Zachary, however, is intrigued when he learns that the odd people he has seen are from the ancient past. His heart, previously seen as damaged by rheumatic fever in the Austin family novel The Moon by Night, is now so weak that he does not expect to live much longer. On the slight possibility that the solution to his problem lies with the ancient druids, Zach rashly leads Polly back to the star-watching rock, a place where Polly found herself in the past once before. Polly and Zach are drawn through a time gate and trapped in ancient Connecticut, with neither the Murrys nor Louise Colubra there to help Polly out of a potentially fatal situation. Tav soon changes his mind about whether his goddess wants Polly to be sacrificed. Her primary danger is not from the People of the Wind, but from their neighbors across the lake, where the drought is more severe.

The People Across the Lake conduct another raid, and leave behind two of their injured members as they withdraw. One of them, Klep, is expected to be his tribe's future leader. He develops an attachment to his healer, Anaral, and learns from Polly the concept of love. The other injured man, Brown Earth, persuades Zachary to cross the lake with him during the night. Tynak, the current leader of the People Across the Lake, promises to let the tribe's medicine man heal Zachary's heart if he helps bring Polly to them. Zach agrees. He participates in another raid, with Polly's capture as the goal. Polly tries to convince Zach that the People Across the Lake intend to sacrifice her for her blood, but he refuses to admit this. Polly escapes, but returns for Zachary's sake. Ultimately, Polly's spirit of self-sacrifice and love, accompanied by the timely return of rain on her captors' side of the lake, wins out as a better way to interact with the Divine than an offering of death. The two tribes agree to unite and help each other. Zachary repents his betrayal of Polly, and his heart is physically healed (at least in part) before they return to their own time. When they return Polly decides that she and Zachary shouldn't see each other any more.

== Notes on series and characters ==
An Acceptable Time is the continuation and culmination of both the Time Quintet and the O'Keefe series (The Arm of the Starfish, Dragons in the Waters and A House Like a Lotus), with references to many places and events from previous books. Alex Murry's interest in the space/time continuum, which led to the events of A Wrinkle in Time, is revisited in depth here. Kate Murry comments on her daughter Meg having had too low an opinion of herself, as seen in A Wrinkle in Time and A Wind in the Door; Kate's research in subcellular biology, a major component of A Wind in the Door, is also mentioned repeatedly. The snake Louise the Larger and her human counterpart, Dr. Louise Colubra, both introduced in A Wind in the Door, return in An Acceptable Time. Sandy Murry is quoted as having said that "some things have to be believed to be seen", a lesson he learned in Many Waters. There is also a reference to Kate Murry's lab being twice tampered with in the beginning of the book, clearly referencing the actions of Sandy and Dennys of "Many Waters", although the Murrys attribute the break-in to some "local kids". Last but not least, Polly's experience with the People of the Wind is consistent with Charles Wallace's interactions with the same tribe in A Swiftly Tilting Planet.

As for Polly's own past adventures, she refers repeatedly to Gaea, her home in The Arm of the Starfish, and mentions the Quiztano people from Dragons in the Waters. An Acceptable Time takes place about six months after Polly's trip to Greece and Cyprus in A House Like a Lotus. In the interim, her friend Max has died and Polly is still grieving. It is implied that one of the reasons she has left fictional Benne Seed Island to study with her grandparents is that Max's death has left her with painful memories of her island home.

Bishop Nason Colubra is the third of L'Engle's characters to be based on a real person. He is based on David Somerville, a retired archbishop of Vancouver.
