= Maximiliana Sebastiane Horne =

Maximiliana Sebastiane (Max) Horne is a major character in Madeleine L'Engle's novel A House Like a Lotus (1984, ISBN 0-374-33385-8). A friend of Sandy Murry, she befriends and mentors Polly O'Keefe.

== Major traits ==
Max is a wealthy intellectual and a painter whose work hangs in museums and private collections. Although she was once married, Max has lived for more than 30 years in a happy lesbian relationship with neurosurgeon Dr. Ursula Heschel. Engaging and energetic, Max befriends and mentors Polly, and they become close friends despite the significant difference in their ages. Max is lean and elegant, with black hair and silver-grey eyes. She has a keen interest in a wide variety of subjects including anthropology, theology, and literature and is a lively conversationalist. In the course of her many travels throughout the world, Max was bitten on the eyelid during a trip to South America and contracted Netson's Disease, for which there is no cure.

== Character ==
Max and her younger sister Minerva Allaire ("M.A.") were raised at Beau Allaire, a plantation Max inherits through her mother's family. Their mother dies when Max and M.A. are young girls, and they grow up dominated by a ruthless, physically and emotionally abusive father who Max describes as a "lecherous old roué." One night when Max is away, he attempts to rape M.A.. She manages to get away from him, but runs into the rain, catches pneumonia and dies in anguish. Max never forgives him, but keeps his portrait in Beau Allaire's dining room to remind herself never to be like him.

As a young woman, Max marries Davin Tomassi, a colleague of Sandy Murry. Max gives birth to a daughter who dies a few days later, breaking Max's heart. Max and Tomassi divorce. After a series of indiscriminate affairs, Max meets neurosurgeon Ursula Heschel, and they enter into a loving relationship. In A House Like a Lotus, they have been lovers and confidantes for more than 30 years.

Max is a successful painter, and some of her paintings are displayed in museums and private collections. A collector of art, she displays works by Hogarth, Van Gogh, Pissarro, and Picasso in Beau Allaire. One of her show pieces is a sculpture known as the Laughing Christ of Baki; this becomes Polly's favorite work, and she and Max talk about it often.

Max and Ursula, who usually live in New York City, have come home to Beau Allaire because of Max's urgent need for medical treatment. On a trip to South America, Max contracted the fatal Netson's disease which kills by parasites invading the heart. There is no cure. A distant cousin of Max's is the world's leading specialist in this disease, and he is on the staff of M.A. Horne Hospital, founded by her father after M.A.'s death. In short, Max has come home to die.

Through Sandy Murry, Max meets Polly and they quickly become good friends. Max, who loves Polly as the daughter she was unable to have, takes a keen interest in her intellectual and social development. They spend many hours together at Beau Allaire, talking and reading. Due to Max's mentoring and love, Polly blossoms both at school and in her social life. But as Max's disease worsens, she has to resort to drinking alcohol to manage the pain. One night when Polly is staying over at Beau Allaire, Max becomes intoxicated because of her pain and makes what some interpret as a sexual advance toward Polly. Polly, traumatized, runs into the rain just as M.A. did many years ago. Max, trying to stop Polly and recalling M.A. fleeing her father years before, sadly screams at her father's portrait that she is just like him.

Despite Max's attempts to reach out to Polly and apologize, Polly refuses to speak to her until, during Polly's stay in Cyprus, she is able to forgive Max, calls her, and they reconcile.

Max dies of Netson's before Polly returns from Cyprus.

== Name ==
Maximiliana Sebastiane Horne and her younger sister, Minerva Allaire were named by their mother. She gave her daughters romantic names because she and her sisters had been named Submit, Patience, and Hope. In A House Like a Lotus, she is called Max or Maxa, and in An Acceptable Time, she is referred to as Max. Metaxa—a strong Greek liqueur—is a third nickname.

== History ==
In A House Like a Lotus, Max is a major character. She is friend and mentor to Polly O'Keefe. Max and her partner Dr. Ursula Heschel are Polly's first exposure to a lesbian couple, particularly a couple who have been happily together for over 30 years. At the end of the book, Max is still alive, but clearly nearing the end of her life.

In An Acceptable Time, Polly is grieving Max's death. Max died before Polly returned from Cyprus on a trip.
