= David Dorfman =

American attorney and retired actor

- Born: February 7, 1993 (age 33); Los Angeles, California, U.S.
- Education: University of California, Los Angeles (BA); Harvard University (JD)
- Occupations: Actor; attorney
- Years active: 1998–2010 (acting)

David Dorfman (born February 7, 1993) is an American attorney and retired actor. He portrayed Aidan Keller in the 2002 horror film remake The Ring and its 2005 sequel, The Ring Two. His other film roles include Sammy in Panic, Joey in Bounce, and Jedidiah Hewitt in The Texas Chainsaw Massacre. He has also portrayed Charles Wallace Murry in the film version of A Wrinkle in Time. In 2008, Dorfman appeared in the film Drillbit Taylor. He was cast alongside Thomas Haden Church in Zombie Roadkill.

As of 2022, Dorfman works in the US House of Representatives, serving as Legislative Director/General Counsel to the Energy & Commerce Committee's Vice Chair and Homeland Security Committee's Cybersecurity Subcommittee Emeritus Chair.

== Education ==
In 2006, Dorfman was admitted to UCLA at age 13. In 2011, he graduated as valedictorian, and was admitted to Harvard Law School at 18.

== Filmography ==
=== Film ===
Year	Title	Role	Notes
1998	Grown-Ups	Ryan	
2000	Panic	Sammy	
2000	Bounce	Joey Janello	
2002	The Ring	Aidan Keller	
2002	100 Mile Rule	Andrew Davis	
2003	The Singing Detective	Young Dan Dark	
2003	The Texas Chainsaw Massacre	Jedidiah Hewitt	
2005	The Ring Two	Aidan Keller	
2008	Drillbit Taylor	Emmit Oosterhaus	

=== Television ===
Year	Title	Role	Notes
1999	Invisible Child	Sam Beeman	Television film
1999	Time of Your Life	Kid	1 episode
2001	Ally McBeal	Sam Paul	1 episode
2001	Black of Life	Nicky	1 episode
1999–2002	Family Law	Rupie Holt	20 episodes
2003	A Wrinkle in Time	Charles Wallace Murry	Television film
2003–2005	Joan of Arcadia	Rocky Tardio	3 episodes
2006	Ghost Whisperer	Daniel Greene	1 episode
2010	Zombie Roadkill	Simon	6 episodes

== Awards and nominations ==
Year	Category	Award	Result
2005	Young Artist Awards	A Wrinkle in Time	Won
2009	Teen Choice Awards	Drillbit Taylor	Won
