= Katie Stuart =

Canadian actress and stunt performer

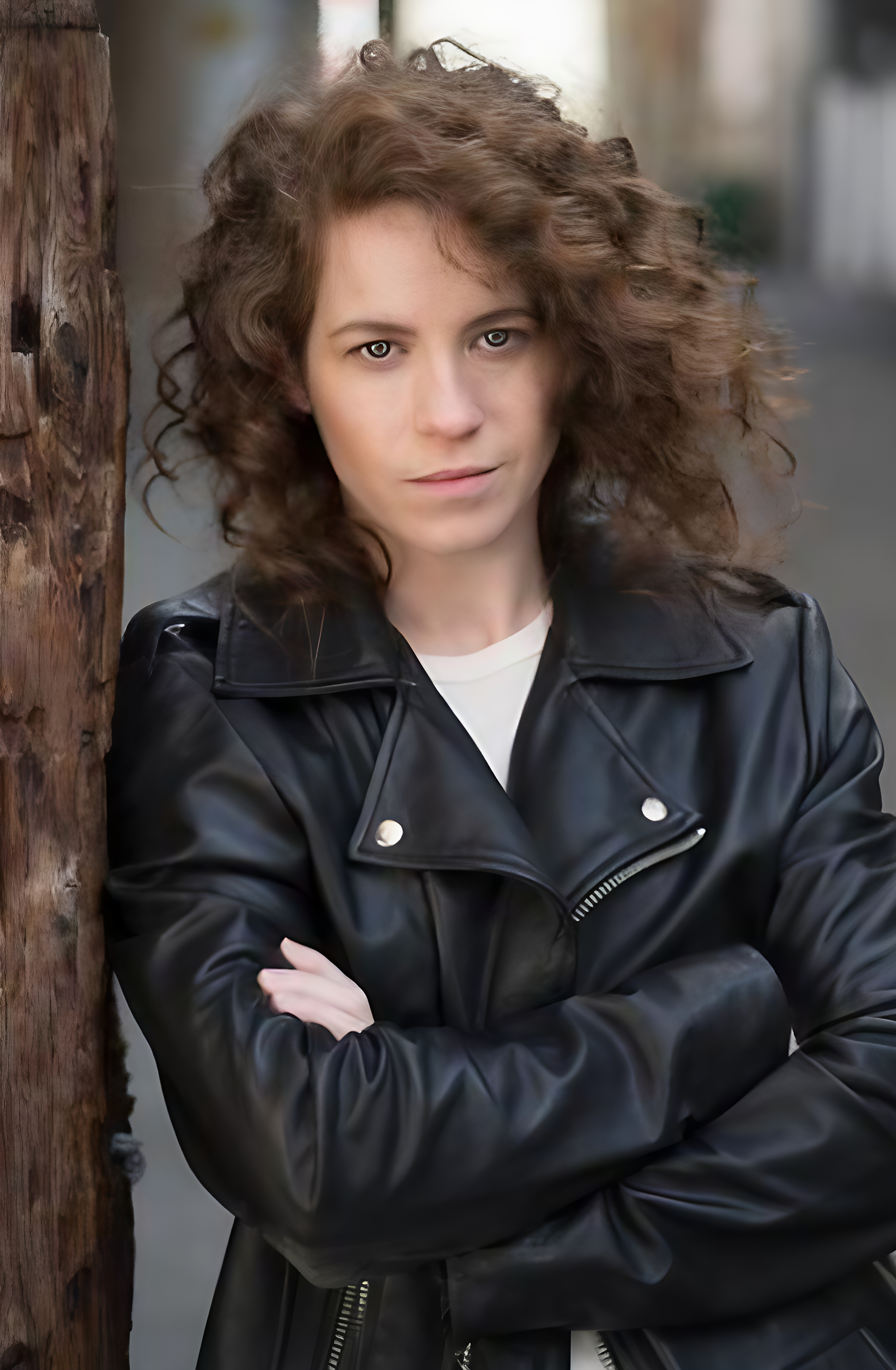
- Born: Katherine Anne Stuart; March 22, 1985 (age 40); Vancouver, British Columbia, Canada
- Years active: 1996–present

Katherine Anne Stuart (born March 22, 1985) is a Canadian actress and stunt performer, born in Vancouver. She played the lead character Meg Murry in the 2003 television film A Wrinkle in Time. She is also known for her recurring role of Zoe Monroe in The 100 and portrayed Rita in the 2017 web series Inconceivable.

== Filmography ==
=== Film ===
| Year | Title | Role | Notes |
|---|---|---|---|
| 1997 | Masterminds | Melissa Randall | |
| 1998 | Summer of the Monkeys | Daisy Lee | |
| 2000 | Epicenter | Robyn Foster | |
| 2001 | Speak | Angel | |
| 2003 | X2 | Kitty Pryde | Cameo |
| 2005 | The Sisterhood of the Traveling Pants | Bunkmate Jo | |
| 2006 | She's The Man | Maria | |
| 2016 | The Edge of Seventeen | Jeannie | |

=== Television ===
| Year | Title | Role | Notes |
|---|---|---|---|
| 1996 | Poltergeist: The Legacy | Patty Greer | Episode: "Revelations" |
| 1996 | Color Me Perfect | Susie | TV movie |
| 1997 | The Sentinel | Gwen Angeloni | Episode: "Private Eyes" |
| 1997 | Survival on the Mountain | Molly | TV movie |
| 1997 | Intensity | Young Chyna Shepherd | TV movie |
| 1997–1998 | Stargate SG-1 | Cassandra Fraiser | Episodes: "Singularity", "In the Line of Duty" |
| 1998 | The Outer Limits | Phoebe | Episode: "Lithia" |
| 1998 | Atomic Dog | Heather Yates | TV movie |
| 1998–1999 | The Crow: Stairway to Heaven | Sarah Mohr | Main role |
| 1999 | The Magician's House | Mary Green | TV miniseries |
| 1999 | Brotherhood of Murder | Zillah Craig | TV movie |
| 2000 | The Magician's House II | Mary Green | TV miniseries |
| 2000 | Mysterious Ways | Breanna | Episode: "Crazy" |
| 2001 | Trapped | Tiffany Sloan | TV movie |
| 2002 | Too Young to Be a Dad | Francesca Howell | TV movie |
| 2003 | A Wrinkle In Time | Meg Murry | TV movie |
| 2004 | Dead Like Me | J. Monteleone | Episode: "Last Call" |
| 2005 | 14 Hours | Ronnie Green | TV movie |
| 2005 | Spirit Bear: The Simon Jackson Story | Marcus | TV movie |
| 2006 | Three Moons Over Milford | Jada Reed | Episodes: "Shoot the Moon", "Moostruck" |
| 2006 | Augusta, Gone | Bridget | TV movie |
| 2007 | Exes & Ohs | Olivia | Episodes: "What Goes Around", "Pole Dancing and Other Forms of Therapy" |
| 2009 | The L Word | Marie | Episodes: "LMFAO", "Last Couple Standing" |
| 2014 | The Returned | Abby Giacchino | Episodes: 01 "Camille", 04 "Victor", 05 "Tony and Adam", 07 "Rowan", 10 "Peter" |
| 2014–2016 | The 100 | Zoe Monroe | Recurring role (seasons 1–3) |
| 2016-2017 | Inconceivable | Rita | Recurring role |
| 2018 | Altered Carbon | Vidaura | Episodes: "Clash by Night", "Nora Inu", "Force of Evil" |
