= Richard Bober =

American illustrator (1943–2022)

Richard Bober (August 14, 1943 – December 10, 2022) was an American artist best known for his work for science fiction, fantasy, and similar paperback novels.

== Early life and education ==
Bober was born in Elizabeth, New Jersey, on August 14, 1943.

One of his teachers in high school was the artist Lee E. Gaskins. Bober studied art at the Pratt Institute from 1961 to 1966, although he did not graduate. He then studied at the Art Students League.

== Career ==
While holding a series of jobs, he began his professional art career in the late 1960s. Bober's style was Romantic, and he primarily worked in oil.

Bober began painting covers for paperback novels in the 1970s. Among Bober's most notable commercial work are his covers for Dell Publishing's 1970s paperback reissues of the "Alfred Hitchcock Presents" novels, Lee J. Hindle's 1984 book Dragon Fall, Bantam's 1980s and 1990s "Inspector Burnet" novels by S. T. Haymon, Dell's 1980s and 1990s "Scene of the Crime" detective-crime novels reissues, crime novels in the 1980s and 1990s by Nancy Pickard, Janet Taylor Lisle's "Investigators of the Unknown" novels of the 1980s and 1990s, Stephen Goldin's "Parsina Saga" novels of the 1990s, and Gene Wolfe's The Book of the Long Sun novels of the 1990s.

In 2023, Amory Sivertson of podcast Endless Thread identified Bober as the illustrator of the 1976 paperback reissue of Madeleine L'Engle's A Wrinkle in Time. This well-known piece of science fiction/fantasy art had not been attributed for 47 years.

In addition to commissioned work, Bober also designed game art, his most notable work being the box cover for the 1994 edition of RuneQuest.

Bober died on December 10, 2022.
