= Major characters in the works of Madeleine L'Engle =

Madeleine L'Engle, an American novelist, diarist and poet, produced over twenty novels, beginning with The Small Rain (1945), and continuing into the 1990s with A Live Coal in the Sea (1996). Many of her fictional characters appeared in more than one novel, sometimes in more than one series of novels. Other major characters are the protagonists of a single title. This article provides information about L'Engle's most notable characters.

In a family tree chart first published inside the front cover of Many Waters (1986, ISBN 0-374-34796-4), L'Engle divided her major characters into categories she called "chronos" and "kairos", two Greek terms for different concepts of time. The stories of the Austin family take place in a chronos environment, which L'Engle defined as "ordinary, wrist-watch, alarm-clock time.". These are presented in a primarily realistic framework, though occasionally with elements that might be regarded as science fiction. Kairos, the framework in which the stories of the Murry and O'Keefe families take place, was defined as "real time, pure numbers with no measurement", and often includes such elements as time travel, fantasy and religious content in a struggle between good and evil. A third category of characters, called by L'Engle "those who cross and connect", link the chronos and kairos stories in a latticework of appearances in multiple series of books, ultimately placing nearly every L'Engle character in the same fictional universe.

== Patterns and sources ==
Although L'Engle's early protagonists (including Katherine Forrester, Philippa Hunter and Camilla Dickinson) tend to be, like L'Engle, an only child, later ones are often part of a large family, possibly in reaction to L'Engle's own lonely childhood. Thus, Meg Murry and Vicky Austin each have three siblings, and Polly O'Keefe has six brothers and sisters. Most of her heroines are artists, such as a pianist, a painter and a poet; but Meg Murry O'Keefe is a mathematician, Camilla is an astronomer and Polly O'Keefe's vocation is undetermined. L'Engle's most important male characters (John Austin, Adam Eddington, Calvin O'Keefe and others) tend to gravitate toward science, or more specifically medicine (Charles Bejart, Dennys Murry, etc.). However, some are artists, actors, composers, or members of the clergy. Music is part of the lives of many of the characters, recreationally if not professionally. For example, the O'Keefes sing together in the evening, Victoria Eaton Austin retired from a brief singing career but frequently plays classical music recordings, and several members of the Davidson family play musical instruments.

L'Engle's young heroines are sometimes compared to the author herself as a teenager, with some of the protagonists experiencing fictionalized versions of settings and incidents from L'Engle's youth. For example, Flip Hunter and Katherine Forrester both attend a Swiss boarding school, as did L'Engle. However, in a 1963 article, L'Engle's husband, Hugh Franklin, professed to see the adult version of the author more clearly in the protagonists' mothers, Mrs. Murry (Dr. Kate Murry) and Mrs. Austin. The only characters acknowledged by L'Engle as being directly based on a real person were Rob Austin, who was based in her son, Bion Franklin; Canon Tallis, who was based on her spiritual advisor, Episcopal Canon Edward Nason West; and Bishop Nason Colubra, based on David Somerville, a retired archbishop of Vancouver.

David Dorfman as Charles Wallace Murry, Katie Stuart as Meg Murry and Gregory Smith as Calvin O'Keefe in the television adaptation of A Wrinkle in Time.

== Recurring Kairos characters ==
=== Murry ===
- Alexander Murry – Astrophysicist in the employ of the U.S. government, husband of Katherine Murry and father of four. Prior to the events of A Wrinkle in Time he takes part in an early experiment in "tessering," and is consequently lost on the planet Camazotz for a few years before being rescued. His first name is revealed in An Acceptable Time. In the television adaptation of A Wrinkle in Time, he is renamed Jack.
- Katherine Murry – Microbiologist and Nobel laureate, wife of Alex Murry and mother of four. Her laboratory is inside her rural home, and she sometimes cooks over a bunsen burner. Considered "a beauty" in contrast to Meg's "outrageous plainness", Kate is loving and nurturing, but unable to protect her family from the dangers they face. Her first name is given in An Acceptable Time. In the television adaptation of A Wrinkle in Time, she is renamed Dana.
- Margaret "Meg" Murry – Eldest daughter of Alexander and Katherine. Somewhat awkward and plain as an adolescent, she acquires social graces and beauty during the course of her maturation covered in A Wrinkle in Time, A Wind in the Door, and A Swiftly Tilting Planet. As a child, she was closest to her youngest brother, Charles Wallace; as an adult she is married to Calvin O'Keefe and has seven children. Meg, a mathematical genius, has not completed her Ph.D. as of A House Like a Lotus, but is frequently described as a scientist and mathematician who helps Calvin with his work.
- Alexander "Sandy" Murry and Dennys Murry – Twin sons of Alexander and Katherine. They describe themselves as the "squares" of the Murry clan. As teenagers, they take a trip to Biblical times, specifically the time immediately preceding the Deluge. In later life, Sandy and his wife Rhea are "anti-corporate" lawyers, and Dennys is a neurosurgeon with a wife named Lucy and a daughter named Kate.
- Charles Wallace Murry – The youngest of the Murry clan. Charles Wallace is described as "something new". He is incredibly intelligent, sensitive, telepathic, an evolutionary next step similar to the Indigo child concept. Charles Wallace is a protagonist in A Wrinkle in Time and A Swiftly Tilting Planet, and one of his mitochondria is the site for the climax of A Wind in the Door. Charles Wallace is small for his age, and is misunderstood and bullied by his peers at school. In later life, Charles Wallace is largely absent from the books owing to secret responsibilities.

=== O'Keefe ===
- Calvin O'Keefe – Marine biologist, husband of Meg, father of a large brood. As a boy, Calvin was a "sport" among what the uncharitable might call white trash, excelling academically, socially, and athletically from an early age, but feeling disconnected from his peers. He finds a truer home with the Murrys. Calvin has ten siblings, two of whom, nicknamed Hinky and Whippy, appear briefly and indirectly in A Wrinkle in Time.
- Polly/Poly (Polyhymnia) O'Keefe – Eldest child of Meg and Calvin. Named, somewhat to her annoyance, by her eccentric Godfather, Canon Tallis. Poly takes part in various socio-political intrigues in Arm of the Starfish and Dragons in the Waters, more personal ones in House like a Lotus, and is incorporated into the Murry time-and-space travel tradition with An Acceptable Time. Initially nicknamed Poly, she changes the spelling to Polly prior to the events of A House Like a Lotus.
- Charles O'Keefe – Named for Charles Wallace Murry, Charles is characterized by sensitivity to others, clairvoyance, and an introspective personal style. He aspires to a career as a doctor who can "take care of all of a person – body, mind and spirit", and is later said to be living with his uncle Dennys Murry in order to take advantage of a better science curriculum at the nearby high school than is found at the school near his home.
- Branwen Zillah Maddox O'Keefe, usually called "Mom" O'Keefe, is a major character in A Swiftly Tilting Planet, appearing as both a loving child and a bitter, dying woman. Encountered by Charles Wallace Murry as he travels "within" people in the past, young "Beezie" loses her innocence and joie de vivre after her brother, Chuck Maddox, receives brain damage due to abuse from their stepfather and dies in an institution. She marries Paddy O'Keefe and becomes the mother of Calvin and his siblings, but shows little interest or affection toward them. At the end of her life, however, she makes a mental connection between Charles Wallace and Chuck, and gives him a rune with which she expects him to save the world from nuclear war — which he does.
- Minor characters from the second-generation O'Keefe family include Polly's other siblings. From eldest to youngest, these are: Alexander (initially called Sandy, later nicknamed Xan), Dennys (Den), Peggy (presumably short for Margaret), Johnny and Mary (nicknamed Rosy). Of these, only Xan receives significant character development in the books, becoming a minor antagonist for Polly in A House Like a Lotus.

=== Other ===
- Dr. Louise Colubra – The Murry family doctor and a close friend of the family. Louise the Larger, a telepathic snake, was named for her. Consults with Dr. Kate Murry about Charles Wallace's "mitochondritis" in A Wind in the Door. Sister of retired Bishop Nason Colubra as revealed in An Acceptable Time.
- Mr. Jenkins – Meg's high school principal in A Wrinkle in Time, who in A Wind in the Door has become the principal of Charles Wallace's elementary school instead, an apparent demotion. He is described as having dandruff and smelling of "old hair cream." He appears not to like or understand either Meg or Charles Wallace, and Meg in turn thinks of Mr. Jenkins as a failure and an obstacle, who believes in "the law of the jungle". However, in A Wind in the Door, Jenkins notices Charles Wallace's physical weakness before Meg does, and Meg is reminded that he once secretly bought Calvin a badly needed pair of shoes. Knowing these things helps Meg to "Name" Mr. Jenkins; i.e., to love and understand him, and help him to do the same. Meg eventually realizes that both she and Mr. Jenkins himself have consistently underestimated him. Once named, Mr. Jenkins joins Meg and Calvin O'Keefe on their quest to save Charles Wallace. He is a classic skeptic.

== Recurring Chronos characters ==
- Vicky Austin – The heroine of the Austin family series of novels and stories, Vicky is a nascent poet and writer, the second eldest of four children. She is usually the first person narrator of the books in which she appears. Often at odds with her younger sister, Suzy, she has a mentor and kindred spirit in her maternal grandfather, retired minister Grandfather Eaton. Vicky dates several boys before developing what may be a more lasting relationship with Adam Eddington.
- John Austin – Vicky's scientifically minded older brother, John, enrolls at M.I.T., and is primarily interested in astrophysics. He also works with Adam Eddington for a summer at the Marine Biology Station on Seven Bay Island. John is intellectually curious and philosophical.
- Suzy Austin (Davidson) – Generally considered the beauty of the family, Suzy "has wanted to be a doctor ever since she could talk." As a young child she gives up eating pork after reading Charlotte's Web. Suzy is the best friend of Maggy Hamilton when Maggy lives with the Austin family for a time after the death of her father. In later books she shows some jealousy toward Vicky over Vicky's boyfriends and friendship with Emily Gregory. As an adult, Suzy is a cardiologist, married to Josiah "Dave" Davidson. They have four children, Josiah (Jos), John, Emily, and Tory.
- Rob Austin – The youngest of the Austin children, Robert Austin is curious and loving, with an ability to make friends easily and a penchant for insightful questions. His favorite toy, an elephant with a music box in it, is named Elephant's Child after one of the Just So Stories by Rudyard Kipling. Madeleine L'Engle acknowledged in A Circle of Quiet, one of the Crosswicks Journals, that Rob is based on her own youngest child, Bion Franklin.
- Dr. Wallace Austin – Medical doctor. The father of the four Austin children, Dr. Austin is a busy doctor in family practice, working out of his home as well as a regional hospital. In The Young Unicorns he takes a year off from his practice to research medical use of an advanced laser device and to write a book on the subject. Orphaned at an early age, Wally helped to raise his younger brother Douglas, an artist.
- Victoria Eaton Austin – Retired singer. Vicky's first person narratives plus a few family conversations scattered through the books establish that her mother, the former Victoria Eaton, met Dr. Austin while singing at a military hospital and subsequently gave up a minor singing career to marry him and have children. Although she made one record album, she has no regrets about the choice she made. Her father, Reverend Eaton, dies shortly after the events of A Ring of Endless Light.

== Crossover characters ==
- Canon John Tallis – Episcopal Canon. Tallis appears in four novels, alongside both the O'Keefe and Austin families as well as the Wheatons (in Certain Women). Rather like a cross between G. K. Chesterton's Father Brown and Ian Fleming's James Bond, Tallis provides spiritual leadership and insight into the realms of crime and international intrigue in equal measure. The character is based on L'Engle's spiritual advisor at St. John the Divine, Canon Edward Nason West. To preserve West's privacy during his lifetime, L'Engle referred to him as Canon Tallis in her non-fiction as well as her fiction. The name is a reference to composer Thomas Tallis, who composed the Tallis Canon. Because of this namesake, Canon Tallis is nicknamed Tom or Father Tom.
- Adam Eddington – Marine biologist. Adam first appears in The Arm of the Starfish working as an intern for Calvin O'Keefe. He is caught up in a power struggle between the O'Keefes and an unscrupulous industrialist vying for control of an emergent medical technology. Later, working with dolphins in New England, he comes into contact with Vicky Austin. More international intrigue later ensnares Adam and Vicky when she follows Adam to Antarctica in Troubling a Star.
- Zachary Gray – Student. Extremely affluent, disaffected young man, oscillating between his desires for redemption and self-destruction. Has complex relationships with both Vicky Austin and (later) Polly O'Keefe. Like Canon Tallis, he appears in four novels. Charming, exciting, unpredictable and emotionally needy, Zach brings out the best in Vicky and Polly, but they cannot save him from himself.
- Katherine Forrester (Vigneras) – Pianist. Main character of The Small Rain (the first half of which was republished as Prelude) and A Severed Wasp. In The Small Rain, Katherine Forrester is a gifted but socially isolated adolescent studying to be a concert pianist at a strict boarding school. Katherine reappears in A Severed Wasp as an old woman (now Katherine Vigneras, from her marriage to her piano teacher and mentor Justin) looking back on her life and career while facing new dangers as she renews her acquaintance with Felix Bodeway, an aspiring violinist who later became an Episcopal bishop and is now semi-retired. Katherine Vigneras also appears very briefly in A Ring of Endless Light playing a recital that Vicky Austin and Zachary Gray attend. In A Severed Wasp, she has a portrait painted by Philippa Hunter, protagonist of And Both Were Young.
- Emmanuele Theotocopoulos (known as "Mr. Theo") – Organist and teacher. Introduced in The Young Unicorns, (1968, ISBN 0-374-38778-8), he is the semi-retired organist at the Cathedral of Saint John the Divine in New York City, and the piano teacher and mentor to the blind piano prodigy Emily Gregory. Mr. Theo is excitable but warm-hearted, with true affection for and protectiveness of children and adolescents who come under his eye. In Dragons in the Waters, Mr. Theo befriends Simon Renier, and later summons Canon Tallis (whom Mr. Theo calls one of his oldest friends) to come and help when Simon's presumed "Cousin Forsyth" is murdered. Mr. Theo normally expresses himself with great formalism and precision, but he is prone to malapropisms such as "It is time that we leveled upon each other" and "You're barking up the right hydrant." Canon Tallis says in The Young Unicorns that he met Mr. Theo in Paris; perhaps English is not his first language. Mr. Theo is described as a "small, old man" and he lives on Riverside Drive in a "large and dilapidated, but still elegant mansion."
- Emily Gregory – Pianist. Emily is the daughter of a renowned scholar of Ancient Greece. Her mother is evidently deceased. Her father once rented an apartment in their house to two scientists visiting New York to work on the Micro-Ray. An intruder broke into the house to steal papers related to the design of the Micro-Ray, only to find Emily, aged ten. The intruder used an uncontrolled Micro-Ray to "temporarily" blind Emily so that she could not see his face, but the Micro-Ray destroyed her optic nerve and blinded her permanently, instead. In The Young Unicorns Emily, now twelve, has resumed her study of the piano with Mr. Theo and is regarded as a prodigy. She has received high-quality training in braille and mobility for the blind at the instigation of Dr. Hyde, the head of the Micro-Ray project. She attends the St. Andrews School, where the Austin children go while they live in New York City. The Austins rent the apartment in Emily's home where the two scientists—Dr. Austin's predecessors in the Micro-Ray project—lived, and where Emily was blinded by the burglar. "Dave" Davidson is employed as her reader and is responsible for helping her get about the neighborhood and looks after her generally. Emily has used her musician's understanding of sound to help her adapt to blindness and has a near-perfect memory for where objects had been placed—so much so that people ask her where they left things. When she recognizes the voice of the false Genie, she unmasks one of the principal villains of The Young Unicorns—and solves the mystery of her blinding. In A Severed Wasp, it is revealed that Emily is now known as Emily de Cortez, married to a conductor named Pio de Cortez, and, in Katherine Vigneras' opinion, "surely one of the best-known interpreters of South American music." As an adult, she has been discreet about her disability because, as Dave Davidson explains, "she wants to be known for her music, not as a blind pianist."
- Mimi Oppenheimer (called Mimi Opp) – Surgeon. She attends the same boarding school as Virginia Bowen, and stays with the family in the Haute-Savoie. She later appears as Katherine Forrester's neighbor and friend in A Severed Wasp. As an adult, Mimi is a surgeon who, despite being Jewish and a bit of an agnostic, is friends with several people at the Cathedral of Saint John the Divine, especially retired bishop Felix Bodeway and Suzy Davidson. Mimi's grandmother was one of the Renier family; she is thus related to Simon Renier of Dragons in the Waters, Queron Renier of A House Like a Lotus and Stella Renier of The Other Side of the Sun.
- Josiah "Dave" Davidson – Dean. A somewhat troubled teenager at the time of The Young Unicorns, Dave is a carpenter's son, a former member of the Alphabats gang, a former choirboy at St. John the Divine Cathedral, and the friend and sometime protector of the Austin children. He is employed to read to the 12-year-old blind pianist Emily Gregory and to help her get about. It is through Emily that he meets the Austins, as her father owns the house where the Austins are staying and she lives in an apartment there. In The Young Unicorns Dave at one point says that Emily is the only person in the world that he loves, but his feeling toward her is that of a brother, not a romantic love. At the time of his encounter with the Austins, Dave has left the St. Andrews School and changed to a trade school where he studies electronics, because learning a trade is the "pragmatic" choice for him. At the end of the novel, his father having died, Dave moves in with the Dean of the cathedral, Juan de Henares and rejoins the Cathedral choir. It is implied that the Dean expects him to do more with his life than electronics repair. As an adult in A Severed Wasp Dave is the Dean of the Cathedral of St. John the Divine, married to the former Suzy Austin, and a friend of Mimi Oppenheimer.
- Virginia Bowen Porcher – Writer. Virginia ("Vee") Bowen first appears in A Winter's Love as the daughter of a woman who falls in love with another man during a difficult time in her marriage. She reappears in A House Like a Lotus as Virginia Bowen Porcher, Polly O'Keefe's favorite writer. Her husband, Henri Porcher, is a descendant of Henry Porcher of the early L'Engle novel Ilsa, and institutionalized with a hereditary form of insanity.
- Frank Rowan – Publisher. Frank first appears in Camilla Dickinson as Camilla's first love. He turns up again in A House Like a Lotus as "the publisher of a small educational press in Istanbul." By that point, he has lost his wife and his leg in an automobile accident in the United States.

== Other protagonists ==
- Camilla Dickinson – As introduced in the novel of the same name (later republished as simply Camilla), the eponymous character is a teenage girl whose suicidal mother is on the edge of having an illicit affair with a man whom Camilla loathes. Meanwhile, Camilla herself develops a romantic attachment to her best friend's older brother, Frank Rowan, who leaves town at the end of the novel. Camilla reappears as the astronomer protagonist of A Live Coal in the Sea (1996).
- Philippa "Flip" Hunter – The protagonist of And Both Were Young, Flip is a young artist who is initially miserable when sent to a boarding school in Switzerland. She meets a mysterious French boy, Paul, who is living at a nearby chateau, and does not remember his past. With the help of Paul and a sympathetic art teacher, Flip learns to get along with her peers, acquires self-confidence, and secretly learns to ski after being declared hopeless at the sport. The character's story closely parallels that of another early L'Engle heroine, Katherine Forrester, and loosely parallels L'Engle's own experiences in boarding school. The adult Hunter is mentioned repeatedly in A Severed Wasp as a successful and respected artist, who painted a portrait decades earlier of Katherine Vigneras with her young son.
- Charlotte Napier – The modern-day protagonist of L'Engle's adult novel The Love Letters (1966), republished in 1996 as Love Letters, ISBN 0-87788-528-1), is the daughter of writer James Clement and the daughter-in-law of Dame Violet Napier. After the death of her son Andrew and the hateful words of her husband, Patrick, Charlotte flees to Portugal where Violet lives. Like L'Engle, Charlotte lost a parent at an early age (Charlotte's mother, L'Engle's father) and subsequently was sent away from her remaining family to live abroad (Charlotte in a series of convents, L'Engle in a series of boarding schools). Also like L'Engle, Charlotte has a brief stage career as an actress. A scene from Charlotte's life also appears in a play performed by actress Emma Wheaton in Certain Women (1992), which suggests that Charlotte's story may be outside the continuity of the L'Engle corpus.
- Simon Bolivar Quentin Phair Renier – Simon appears in Dragons in the Waters as a young boy of poor but aristocratic southern background, flung into the wide world after the sale of a portrait of Bolivar, one of the last heirlooms of the Phair family. He encounters the O'Keefe clan and Canon Tallis, and eventually comes into contact with another set of noble roots in distant Venezuela. Although Simon does not appear in other books, some of his relatives appear in Ilsa, The Other Side of the Sun (a historical novel for adults) and A House Like a Lotus. Simon was raised by his great-aunt, Leonis Phair, whose relatives appear in The Other Side of the Sun.
- Stella Renier – Stella appears in L'Engle's adult novel The Other Side of the Sun (1971, ISBN 0-374-22805-1) as both a grandmother in her eighties and as a 19-year-old newlywed in 1910, arriving from England to stay with her husband's aristocratic Southern family. There she gets caught up in conflicts and intrigues going all the way back to the American Civil War and beyond, and tries to make peace.
- Emma Wheaton – Emma, the protagonist of Certain Women (1992, ISBN 0-374-12025-0), is an actress, the daughter of David Wheaton. Her large family congregates as David is dying, which leads Emma to come to terms with the traumas of her past as she considers an uncertain future. The book centers on the story of Emma's life and family and its parallels to the family of the biblical King David.
