= A Wind in the Door =

1973 novel by Madeleine L'Engle

- Author: Madeleine L'Engle
- Cover artist: Richard Bober
- Language: English
- Series: Time Quintet
- Genre: Young Adult; Science fiction
- Publisher: Farrar, Straus & Giroux
- Publication date: January 1, 1973
- Media type: Print (hardback & paperback)
- Pages: 211
- ISBN: 978-0-374-38443-2
- OCLC: 709787
- LC Class: PZ7.L5385 Wi
- Preceded by: A Wrinkle in Time
- Followed by: A Swiftly Tilting Planet

A Wind in the Door is a young adult science fantasy novel by American author Madeleine L'Engle. It is a companion book to A Wrinkle in Time and part of the Time Quintet.

== Plot ==
Fourteen-year-old Meg Murry is worried about her brother Charles Wallace, a 6-year-old genius bullied at school by the other children. The new principal at Charles Wallace's elementary school is Meg's former high school principal, Mr. Jenkins, who often disciplined Meg, and Meg is sure he has a grudge against her whole family. Meg tries to enlist Mr. Jenkins' help in protecting her brother from bullies but is unsuccessful. Later, Meg discovers that Charles Wallace has a progressive disease that is leaving him short of breath. Their mother, a microbiologist, suspects a dysfunction of his farandolae, fictional invisible organelles within his mitochondria.

One afternoon, Charles Wallace tells Meg of a "drive of dragons" in their backyard, where he and Meg thereupon discover a pile of unusual metallic feathers. Later, Meg has a frightening encounter with a monstrous facsimile of Mr. Jenkins. That night, Meg, Charles Wallace, and their friend, 16-year-old Calvin O'Keefe, discover that Charles Wallace's "drive of dragons" is an extraterrestrial "singular cherubim" named Proginoskes (nicknamed 'Progo' by Meg), under the tutelage of the immense humanoid "Teacher" Blajeny, who recruits the three children to counteract the Echthroi, a malevolent force in the universe that manifests on Earth as hatred, destruction, and war.

Meg's first task, taking place on the next day, is to distinguish the real Mr. Jenkins from two Echthroi doubles, by identification of the (potential) goodness in him despite her personal grudge. The protagonists then learn that Echthroi are destroying Charles Wallace's farandolae by persuading them not to root themselves in one place and mature. They travel inside one of his mitochondria to persuade a larval farandola, named Sporos, to accept its role as a mature fara. In the process, Meg is nearly annihilated (or "Xed"), and Mr. Jenkins is invaded by his Echthros doubles; whereafter Proginoskes sacrifices himself to "fill in" the emptiness of the Echthroi, and Charles Wallace is saved.

== Characters ==
Meg Murry is a high school student, a defensive misfit who gets along best with her family and her friend Calvin O'Keefe. She wears glasses, has brown hair, and initially considers herself "repulsive-looking" and "dumb", although she is quite good at math.

Charles Wallace Murry is Meg's youngest brother and extremely intelligent, wise, and telepathic. Charles Wallace is bullied by fellow children and misunderstood by adults outside his family. He recognizes that this is a problem he must solve himself. Charles has blue eyes, and is said to be small for his age.

Calvin O'Keefe is tall, with orange hair, freckles and blue eyes, and is a popular boy on the basketball team. However, he did not feel that anyone understands or cares about him until he became friends with the Murry family. He is the third eldest child of Paddy and Branwen O'Keefe, who have eleven children and are seemingly neglectful of all of them. Calvin considers himself a biological "sport" and different from the rest of his family.

Proginoskes is a "singular cherubim"; he becomes a particular friend of Meg's. "Progo" has what seems like hundreds of constantly moving wings, a great quantity and variety of eyes, and is constantly emitting jets of flame and smoke. He does not always take material form, and even when he does, as he tells Meg, not everyone is able to see him. Like Meg, Proginoskes is a Namer, and once learned the names of all the stars. The character's name means "foreknowledge". He teaches and helps Meg kythe, which is best described as an advanced form of telepathy. Naomi Kritzer has described meeting L'Engle when she (Kritzer) was nine and asking what Progo's fate was, to which L'Engle replied "He's the wind at the end that blows the door open. That's him coming back."

== Story development ==
The novel grew out of a short story, "Intergalactic P.S. 3", first published as a pamphlet for Children's Book Week in 1970. In this early version of the narrative, Mrs Whatsit, Mrs Who and Mrs Which from A Wrinkle in Time send Charles Wallace, Meg and Calvin to a school on another planet, where Proginoskes and a conifer seed version of Sporos are among their classmates. As in the novel, Meg must identify the real Mr. Jenkins among his two impostors. If she fails, it will be "a victory for the Dark Shadow" (i.e. the Black Thing).

In Walking on Water: Reflections on Faith and Art, L'Engle states that at one stage in the writing of A Wind in the Door, she knew who most of the characters would be, including Progo, the snake and "the three Mr. Jenkinses." She had difficulty developing the story, however, until a physician friend gave her two articles about mitochondria. "And there was where the story wanted me to go," L'Engle writes, "away from the macrocosm and into the microcosm." Enlisting the help of her elder daughter, she proceeded to give herself "a crash course in cellular biology," which she found to be hard work, but also a lot of fun.

== Reception ==
At the time of the book's publication, Kirkus Reviews said, "The audacity of Mrs. L'Engle's mytho-scientific imagination and her undoubted storytelling abilities keep the reader involved in Meg's quest, but one wonders whether its chief appeal doesn't lie in the all too natural desire to believe that our difficulties, like the Murrys', are personal attacks by the forces of cosmic evil... Unfortunately, Meg learns to love the universe with unconvincing ease, and L'Engle seems to be straining unusually hard to relate what's wrong with America to the double-talk phenomenon of mitochondria and farandolae." Michele Murray wrote in The New York Times, "Madeleine L'Engle mixes classical theology, contemporary family life, and futuristic science fiction to make a completely convincing tale that should put under its spell both readers familiar with the Murrys and those meeting them for the first time." In a 2012 essay for Tor.com, American author and critic Mari Ness wrote, "This is L'Engle at the height of her poetic powers, and the failure of this book to receive the same attention and fame as its predecessor is a genuine shame."

== Audio adaptation ==
A Listening Library edition on four audio cassettes, unabridged and read by the author, was issued in 1994. ISBN 0-8072-7506-9 In January 2012, Listening Library released an audio CD version narrated by actress Jennifer Ehle. ISBN 0307916618

== See also ==
- Farandole
