= A Wrinkle in Time (2003 film) =

Television fantasy film

- DVD cover
- Based on: A Wrinkle in Time by Madeleine L'Engle
- Written by: Susan Shilliday
- Directed by: John Kent Harrison
- Starring: Katie Stuart; Gregory Smith; David Dorfman; Chris Potter; Kyle Secor; Seán Cullen; Sarah-Jane Redmond; Kate Nelligan; Alison Elliott; Alfre Woodard
- Music by: Jeff Danna (film version); Patric Caird (four-hour miniseries cut); Shawn Pierce (four-hour miniseries cut)
- Countries of origin: United States; Canada
- Original language: English

Production
- Producers: Jolee B. Lovick; Jordan Kerner
- Cinematography: Jon Joffin; Philip Linzey
- Editor: Sue Maggi
- Running time: 124 minutes
- Production companies: Walt Disney Television; Miramax/Dimension Television; Fireworks Entertainment; The Kerner Entertainment Company

Original release
- Network: ABC
- Release: April 24, 2003

A Wrinkle in Time is a 2003 television fantasy film directed by John Kent Harrison from a teleplay by Susan Shilliday. The film, a Canadian and U.S. production, is based on the 1962 novel of the same name by Madeleine L'Engle. It is produced by Walt Disney Television, Miramax/Dimension Television, Fireworks Entertainment, and The Kerner Entertainment Company. The film stars Katie Stuart, Gregory Smith, David Dorfman, Chris Potter, Kyle Secor, Seán Cullen, Sarah-Jane Redmond, Kate Nelligan, Alison Elliot, and Alfre Woodard.

A Wrinkle in Time premiered at the Toronto Children's film Festival on April 24, 2003, where it won the Best Feature Film Award.

== Plot ==
Meg Murry is having a difficult time. Her father, astrophysicist Dr. Jack Murry, has mysteriously disappeared. Her youngest brother, Charles Wallace, a genius, is teased and belittled and thought to be stupid because he does not talk to anyone but family. Meg does not get along with her peers, teachers, her 10-year-old twin brothers, or even with herself.

Into this unhappy situation comes a stranger, the mysterious, weirdly dressed Mrs. Whatsit, and her friends Mrs. Who and Mrs. Which. They take Meg, Charles Wallace, and their new friend Calvin O'Keefe via "tesseract" to other planets, preparing the children for a mission to rescue Dr. Murry from the malevolent "IT" on the planet Camazotz. Along the way they ride on the back of a beautiful winged creature (the transformed Mrs. Whatsit), learn about the shadow of tangible evil known as the Black Thing, and visit the Happy Medium, a cheerful and androgynous fortune-teller.

Once they reach Camazotz, however, it is up to Meg, Calvin, and Charles Wallace to face the dangers of CENTRAL Central Intelligence, aided only by each other and a pair of Mrs. Who's glasses. They do find and rescue Dr. Murry, but Charles Wallace is seduced away from his family by IT's agent, the Man with Red Eyes, and thus comes under the control of IT. Dr. Murry manages to tesser himself, Meg and Calvin, away from Camazotz, but Charles Wallace is left behind, trapped in the mind of IT. Angry with her father, Calvin and herself for leaving Charles Wallace behind, Meg is cared for by the sightless and motherly Aunt Beast on the planet Ixchel and argues with Mrs. Which about returning to rescue her brother. Returning alone to Camazotz, Meg must find a quality in herself—love—to free Charles Wallace, and possibly free the planet Camazotz as well.

== Cast ==
From left: David Dorfman as Charles Wallace Murry, Katie Stuart as Meg Murry and Gregory Smith as Calvin O'Keefe on the planet Uriel

- Katie Stuart as Meg Murry
- Gregory Smith as Calvin O'Keefe
- David Dorfman as Charles Wallace Murry
- Chris Potter as Dr. Jack Murry
- Kyle Secor as the Man With Red Eyes and "Hank", Jack Murry's research partner
- Seán Cullen as the Happy Medium
- Sarah-Jane Redmond as Dr. Dana Murry
- Kate Nelligan as Mrs. Which
- Alison Elliott as Mrs. Who
- Alfre Woodard as Mrs. Whatsit
- Munro Chambers and Thomas Chambers as Sandy and Dennys Murry, the twins
- Apollonia Vanova as Valentina Tereshkova

== Production ==
In September 1993, some time after its acquisition by Disney, Miramax announced a $15 million theatrical feature based on L'Engle's A Wrinkle in Time as one of the first projects under its Family Films banner. Production ultimately began in 2001, when project creator Catherine Hand (with Miramax's assistance) worked behind the scenes alongside TV producer Norman Lear to bring her vision to life. A two-part miniseries running four hours was initially planned, but the final product was later cut down into a singular, three-hour program. While this made-for-television film was initially intended to be released in the United States in 2002, this release was delayed until 2004.

The audience is provided with an explanation of tesseract through Mrs. Whatsit, who describes it as a "wrinkle in time" that allows one to travel across the universe. Transforming such abstracts into television images was one of the many hurdles for the makers of the movie, but production issues regarding this portrayal were overcome by the use of special effects.

Other difficulties with filming primarily concerned the way in which the novel was written because of L'Engle's focus on the internal feelings and thoughts of the characters, noted Suzanne Macneille of The New York Times. Macneille recognized that, like with any film adaptation of a novel, the story adaptation could result in controversies because protective readers of the original story may look down upon any variation in plot.

== Reception ==
A Wrinkle in Time received mixed reviews from film critics and journalists alike. Sharon Eberson, journalist for the Pittsburgh Post-Gazette described it as a "a most faithful adaptation." In particular, Eberson praised the interpretation of the "Wookiee-like beasts" from the planet Ixchel. People's Terry Kelleher credited the film's inventive designing of the 1984 version of the dark planet (Camazotz). That said, Kelleher hinted at a "preachy" ending.

As Diane Ortiz from The University Wire described it, the novel's first film adaptation was a "dud", emphasizing its lack of substantial acting and special effects. In her same article, Eberson acknowledged a similar inadequacy in the special effects and explained how they did not meet the hopes of the creators nor the viewers. Nick Mangione, from Geek.com, suggested that many of the problems associated with the film relate to the creator's decision to dumb-down the concepts from the novel. Mangione pointed out that in her novel, L'Engle trusted her audience and knew they would be able to understand the complex thoughts of the characters. He believes that the film version shows no trust in the audience and spends the entire time simplifying everything and neglecting any of the more complex ideas. Mangione further stated, "It's almost impressive how they managed to take every major location and plot beat from the novel and get absolutely none of it right."

In a Q&A with MSNBC/Newsweek Entertainment reporter Melinda Henneberger, Madeleine L'Engle, author of the original novel, said, "I have glimpsed it... I expected it to be bad, and it is."

== Release ==
The original 2001 production, a miniseries, was released in Canada, Australia, and Germany. A Wrinkle in Time premiered at the Toronto Children's Film Festival, where it won the festival's 2003 Best Feature Film Award.

The original adaptation also came with a teacher's guide that included student-directed questions about the film. Examples of some of these questions include: "Why does Meg Murray think that she is stupid?", "How would you rate Meg's intelligence level?", and "Why does Meg think that no one likes her?"

=== Home media ===
A Wrinkle in Time was released on VHS and DVD November 16, 2004 by Buena Vista Home Entertainment. The special features included deleted scenes, a "behind the scenes" segment, and an interview with Madeleine L'Engle.

The home video rights to the film have since been obtained by Echo Bridge Home Entertainment, which has released the title both as a standalone DVD and as part of several family film bundles.

== Awards and nominations ==
Wins

- Toronto Children's Film Festival Best Feature Film Award

Nominations

- Writers Guild Best Children's Script Award

== See also ==
- A Wrinkle in Time (2018 film)
