= Echthroi =

Greek word for hate and hostility

Echthroi (ἐχθροί) is a Greek plural meaning "the enemy" (literally "enemies"). The singular form of the word, echthros (ἐχθρός), is used in many versions and translations of the Bible for "enemy".

The words echthros and echthroi occur mainly in connection with biblical studies and in literary criticism of classical literature, specifically Greek tragedy. Aristotle and others classified people encountered by characters in tragedy into "philoi" (friends and loved ones), "echthroi" (enemies), and "medetoeroi" (neither enemy or friend), with the characters and their audience seeking a positive outcome for the first group and the downfall of the second.

The term also appears in Canto XII of the little-known epic The Purple Island by seventeenth-century poet and rector Phineas Fletcher, apparently in the general meaning of enemies.

== See also ==
- A Wind in the Door and A Swiftly Tilting Planet, novels by Madeleine L'Engle featuring antagonists called Echthroi
