= A House Like a Lotus =

1984 young adult novel by Madeleine L'Engle

- A House Like a Lotus first edition
- Author: Madeleine L'Engle
- Cover artist: Muriel Nasser (hardback)
- Language: English
- Series: Polly O'Keefe
- Genre: Young adult novel
- Publisher: Farrar, Straus and Giroux
- Publication date: November 1, 1984
- Publication place: United States
- Media type: Print (hardback & paperback)
- Pages: 308 pp
- ISBN: 0-374-33385-8
- OCLC: 11373233
- LC Class: PZ7.L5385 Ho 1984
- Preceded by: Dragons in the Waters
- Followed by: An Acceptable Time

A House Like a Lotus (ISBN 0-374-33385-8) is a 1984 young adult novel by American author Madeleine L'Engle. Its protagonist is sixteen-year-old Polly O'Keefe, whose friend and mentor, Maximiliana Horne (Max), has sent her on a trip to Greece and Cyprus. As she travels, Polly must come to terms with a recent traumatic event involving Max. The history of Polly's relationship with Max is told in flashback over the course of the novel. The use of double quotes distinguishes the present, whereas single quotes indicate flashbacks from the past.

== Plot summary ==
Polly begins narrating the novel just as she arrives in Greece. She expects to be picked up by her aunt and uncle but they were detained and will not arrive in Greece for a few days. Polly goes to her hotel and feels rather depressed about the current state of affairs. But her mood improves when she meets Zachary Gray at the hotel restaurant. He is quite interested in her and is attracted to her innocence. He offers to take her around Greece and show her the sights. Polly is reluctant but agrees.

Zachary is an interesting tour guide and Polly enjoys his companionship. But when Zachary begins to show interest in a romantic and physical relationship, she resists. When Polly's aunt and uncle show up, Zachary is unable to keep up his relationship with Polly but insists that they will see each other again.

During this time, Polly has been flashing back to the past and how she managed to get a trip to Greece. About six months earlier, Polly was introduced to Max, a friend of her uncle. Although Max is a middle-aged woman and Polly is still a teenager, the two begin a friendship and Max encourages Polly to develop her identity. Polly's young male friend Renny also encourages her, and Polly blossoms. When Max admits that she and her "friend" Ursula have been lovers for thirty years, Polly is surprised but decides this does not change who Max is and remains friends. Max also admits she is dying, which devastates Polly. But after one night of heavy drinking, Max makes what seems to be a sexual advance toward Polly. Polly is horrified. Ursula tries to assure Polly that Max loves her (Polly) as a daughter, not in any romantic sense but Polly is still terrified and runs away. She stays with Renny. While still vulnerable and scared, Polly and Renny sleep together. Polly returns to her family and does not tell them about Max or Renny. While she severs all contact with Max, she still accepts the trip to Greece.

At present, Polly is going to a literary conference, held in Cyprus, where she is to volunteer. Surrounded by new friends and interesting work, Polly begins to heal. But Zachary suddenly appears and asks Polly to go out with him. She reluctantly agrees. The two go sailing on the ocean but an accident occurs and they nearly drown. They are saved by Polly's friends from the conference. This event makes Polly realize that she needs to talk to Max, before it's too late. She phones America and tells Max that she forgives her. The line goes dead after a few minutes but Polly is satisfied because she and Max have become friends once more.

== Major characters ==
- Polyhymnia "Polly" O'Keefe - Nearly seventeen years old at the time of the novel, Polly describes herself as mature beyond her years in some ways, remarkably immature in others. She has red hair and blue eyes, is tall and thin, and recently cut her hair short. This is the first book in which she spells her nickname "Polly" instead of "Poly." She was named after the Greek muse of sacred music.
- Maximiliana "Max" Sebastiane Horne- is a successful artist (a painter) who recently returned to her Southern mansion, Beau Allaire. She has a tragic past, her mother and sister both having died young. Max blames her ruthless and lascivious father for both deaths. Max generally sees Polly as the daughter she could not have, her only child having died a few days after birth. Max was formerly married to Davin Tomassi, and after their divorce remained friends with him until his death. Prior to her illness, Max was well-traveled.
- Dr. Ursula "Urse" Heschel- is a gifted neurosurgeon, currently on sabbatical as she takes care of Max. She is a longtime friend and colleague of Polly's Uncle Dennys, apparently since he was in college. Ursula has been Max's lover and confidante for over thirty years.
- Sandy Murry is Poly's favorite uncle. He is the identical twin brother of Dr. Dennys Murry, a neurosurgeon specializing in research; elder brother to Charles Wallace Murry, who does not appear in this novel; and a younger brother to Polly's mother, Meg Murry O'Keefe. Sandy and his wife, Rhea, are "anti-corporate" lawyers, traveling the world to protect people from the rich and powerful. Sandy wears a beard, partly to distinguish himself from Dennys.
- Zachary Gray is a sometime college student, the only son of a rich, widowed businessman. Having recently been "dumped" by a girlfriend (about two years after the end of his relationship with Vicky Austin in A Ring of Endless Light), Zach is in Europe, wandering around as he reassesses himself and his priorities. It is uncertain if the former girlfriend Zach mentions is Vicky Austin or another girl. The details Zach mentions would fit his relationship with Vicky. Zach is charming, arrogant, impulsive and reckless, but also remarkably astute in his impressions about Polly. Of the three major crossover characters between the O'Keefe family and Austin family series of books (the others being Canon Tallis and Adam Eddington), Zach is the only one who first appeared in the Austin books.
- Dr. Queron Renier- is a cousin of Simon Renier, the protagonist of Dragons in the Waters. Renny is an intern at M.A. Horne Hospital, an assistant to Dr. Bart Netson, and Polly's first boyfriend, although she initially assumes that he thinks of her a kid sister. Renny became interested in South American diseases partly as a result of a past relationship with a medical student from Chile.

== Series notes ==
This is the third of four novels featuring Polly O'Keefe, the rest being, in order, The Arm of the Starfish (1965), Dragons in the Waters (1976) and An Acceptable Time (1989). A House Like a Lotus is the only one of the four written in first person. These books, collectively called the O'Keefe series, are themselves part of a larger series, the Murry-O'Keefe books. Polly is born shortly after the events of A Swiftly Tilting Planet, the last (by internal chronology) of four books about Polly's parents and uncles. Most of the Murry-O'Keefe books have elements of science fiction or fantasy or both. A House Like a Lotus has very little of this, however, just a fictional disease (Netson's Disease) and an incident in which Virginia Bowen Porcher shows signs of ESP when she correctly guesses that Polly is in danger. Judging by Polly's age, A House Like a Lotus takes place four years after The Arm of the Starfish, two years after Dragons in the Waters and a year before An Acceptable Time.
