= Hugh Franklin (actor) =

American actor

- Born: August 24, 1916; Muskogee, Oklahoma, U.S.
- Died: September 26, 1986 (aged 70); Torrington, Connecticut, U.S.
- Occupation: Actor
- Years active: 1938–1983
- Spouse: Madeleine L'Engle (1946–1986)
- Children: 3

Hugh Hale Franklin (August 24, 1916 – September 26, 1986) was an American stage and television actor. He was born in Muskogee, Oklahoma.

Franklin was best known for his role as Dr. Charles Tyler on All My Children, a role he played from the show's first episode in 1970 until 1983. He was forced to retire as his hearing loss, which had previously been gradual, started to affect his ability to receive cues.

He also had roles on the soap operas As the World Turns, Dark Shadows, and Love of Life.

Prior to All My Children, Franklin appeared in such Broadway productions as The Joyous Season, I Know My Love, and Medea. Other theatre credits include Harriet, The Cherry Orchard, One Man Show, and Alice in Wonderland.

He was married for 40 years to Newbery Medal-winning author Madeleine L'Engle. She wrote a book about their marriage, called Two-Part Invention: The Story of a Marriage (1988), and frequently mentioned him in her other non-fiction titles.

Franklin died of cancer on September 26, 1986 in Connecticut. He and L'Engle had three children: Josephine, Maria, and Bion Franklin.
