= Dragons in the Waters =

1976 young adult murder mystery by Madeleine L'Engle

- Dragons in the Waters first edition
- Author: Madeleine L'Engle
- Cover artist: Richard Cuffari (hardback)
- Language: English
- Series: Polly O'Keefe
- Genre: Young adult mystery novel
- Publisher: Farrar, Straus and Giroux
- Publication date: April 1, 1976
- Publication place: United States
- Media type: Print (Hardback & Paperback)
- Pages: 293 pp
- ISBN: 0-374-31868-9
- OCLC: 2020677
- LC Class: PZ7.L5385 Dr
- Preceded by: The Arm of the Starfish
- Followed by: A House Like a Lotus

Dragons in the Waters (ISBN 0-374-31868-9) is a 1976 young adult murder mystery by American author Madeleine L'Engle, the second title to feature her character Poly O'Keefe. Its protagonist is thirteen-year-old Simon Bolivar Quentin Phair Renier, an impoverished orphan from an aristocratic Southern family. The title comes from Psalm 74:13.

== Plot summary ==
Simon's Aunt Leonis accepts an invitation for Simon to travel by freighter to Venezuela with Simon's cousin, Forsyth Phair. Phair recently purchased a valuable heirloom painting of Simon Bolivar from Aunt Leonis. It is a relic of Simon's forebear, Quentin Phair, who fought at Bolivar's side. The portrait was sold to raise money to support Simon and Miss Leonis, who is ninety years old. Forsyth proposes to donate the portrait to a museum in Caracas — but all is not as it seems. A dangerous "accident" involving a forklift and odd interactions aboard the S.S. Orion lead fellow passengers Poly and Charles O'Keefe to believe that Simon's "Cousin Forsyth" may be a source of danger to Simon. When Forsyth is murdered and the portrait is stolen, Poly does not know what to think, but it is clear that Simon is still in danger.

Another passenger, Mr. Theo, calls for Poly's godfather, Canon Tallis, to come and investigate, but Tallis and Simon are both kidnapped by the local police chief upon arrival in Port of Dragons, Venezuela, and left stranded in the jungle. Miss Leonis also arrives, having learned before the murder that the check paying for the portrait was worthless. She has also just read Quentin Phair's letters and journals, thus learning belatedly that Simon's heroic ancestor left behind a wife and son among the Quiztano Indians of Dragonlake in Venezuela. Phair also started the "Caring Places", two large buildings in which Quiztano healers, some of them with medical degrees, help the sick and the dying. The connection between Quentin Phair and Umara of the Quiztanos is the underlying cause of Simon's current predicament, part of a tangled web of murder, smuggling, blackmail and a generations-old grudge. Alejandro Hurtado, a friend of Tallis, initially arrests Jan, a Dutch sailor with Quiztano blood, but the ship's first mate, Lyolf Boon, soon confesses to Phair's murder.

Simon and Tallis fight off an attack from a wild boar, but Tallis receives a leg injury, which becomes infected. When a wildcat attacks, Tallis orders Simon to run away. Panicked, Simon does so, but feels guilty afterward. Both are rescued by the Quiztanos and brought to Dragonlake. Miss Leonis is already there, and is dying. The Quiztanos hail Simon's arrival as the long-awaited "return of the Phair". After some initial resistance, Simon decides to stay at Dragonlake and continue the good work that his ancestor started with the Caring Places.

== Characters ==
Major characters in the book who appear in other works by L'Engle include Poly and Charles O'Keefe and their parents, Calvin O'Keefe and Meg Murry O'Keefe, as well as Simon Phair-Reinier, Mr. Theotocopoulos, Forsyth Phair and Canon Tallis.

== Reception ==
At the time of the book's publication, Kirkus Reviews said, "Of all L'Engle's novels, we find this the most satisfying, perhaps because it doesn't demand to be taken with such deadly seriousness. Deduct ten points at the beginning for self-importance and enjoy the rest for a lark." Cynthia Benjamin wrote in The New York Times, "There is enough adventure in 'Dragons in the Waters' to make Nancy Drew and her chums squirm... The plot of 'Dragons in the Waters' is complex and might be confusing to less able readers. The narrative is an intriguing mixture of contemporary allusions and gothic mystery."
